= Prithviraj Singh =

Maharaj Rana of Jhalawar from 1845 to 1875

- Maharaj Rana

Maharaj Rana of Jhalawar
- Reign: 1845 – 29 August 1875
- Coronation: 1845
- Investiture: 1847
- Predecessor: Madan Singh
- Successor: Zalim Singh II
- Born: 1830
- Died: 29 August 1875 (aged 44–45)
- Wives: Nathawatiji; Bhatiyaniji; Solankiji
- Issue: Zalim Singh II (adoptive)
Names
- Prithviraj Singh
- House: Jhalawar
- Dynasty: Jhala
- Father: Madan Singh

Prithviraj Singh (1830 – 29 August 1875), commonly known as Prithvi Singh, was the second Maharaj Rana of Jhalawar from 1845 until his death on 29 August 1875.

== Early life and family ==
He was born in 1830 to Madan Singh. He married, firstly, Nathawatiji, who was of Chomu; secondly, Bhatiyaniji, who was of Goraich in Udaipur; and thirdly, Solankiji, a daughter of Dalelsinhji of Lunawada. He had a daughter by his first wife, who, in 1861, married Sheodan Singh of Alwar. He had no male children of his own, so he adopted Bakht Singh, who later renamed himself Zalim Singh II, from Wadhwan and was related to him in the ninth degree.

== Reign ==
When his father died in 1845, he succeeded him as the Maharaj Rana of Jhalawar at the age of fifteen. Owing to his minority, a Council of Regency comprising the old officials of the state was established to govern state affairs until he comes of age. During the Indian Rebellion of 1857, he rendered valuable service to the East India Company by providing protection to British officers and by ensuring the safety of several Europeans who had taken refuge in his district. Tatya Tope, after his defeat at the Banas River, arrived at Jhalrapatan in Jhalawar. Prithviraj's troops sided with the rebels, and Tatya took possession of Prithviraj's approximately 30 guns, ammunition, and horses, and surrounded the palace. Rebels halted at Jhalrapatan for five days and forced Prithviraj to give them Rs. 1,500,000, after which he fled to Mhow to save his life. Seeing this, the Government remitted his tribute for that year. Coins of his father, Madan Singh, bore the name and title of the Mughal emperor Bahadur Shah II, and he continued this practice until the Indian Rebellion of 1857. However, in 1857, he issued a new series of silver coins in his state that bore the inscription Malika-i-Mua’zzama Victoria Badishah-i-Inglistan, which translates to Queen Victoria, the exalted monarch of England. It is believed he was the first among Indian rulers to replace the name of the Mughal emperor on his coins. He was granted the Sanad of Adoption in 1862. In 1866, he agreed to transfer land to the government free of cost to build a railway. He relinquished most control over the land, except for his sovereign rights, and also surrendered the right to levy transit duties on goods passing through his area. He attended the durbar of 1870 at Ajmer.

== Character ==
He had a good nature, a happy disposition, and was very popular with his subjects. But several of his ministers took advantage of his good nature and easy-going disposition, gaining control of the state treasury, which resulted in the state becoming heavily indebted.

== Death ==
He died on 29 August 1875, but the question of who would succeed him remained unanswered for some time due to the rumored pregnancy of his widow. However, as no child was born to her, he was succeeded by Zalim Singh II, his adoptive son, on 1 June 1876.
