= Garh Palace, Jhalawar =

Former residence of the Maharaj Ranas of the Jhalawar

Garh Palace
- गढ़ पैलेस
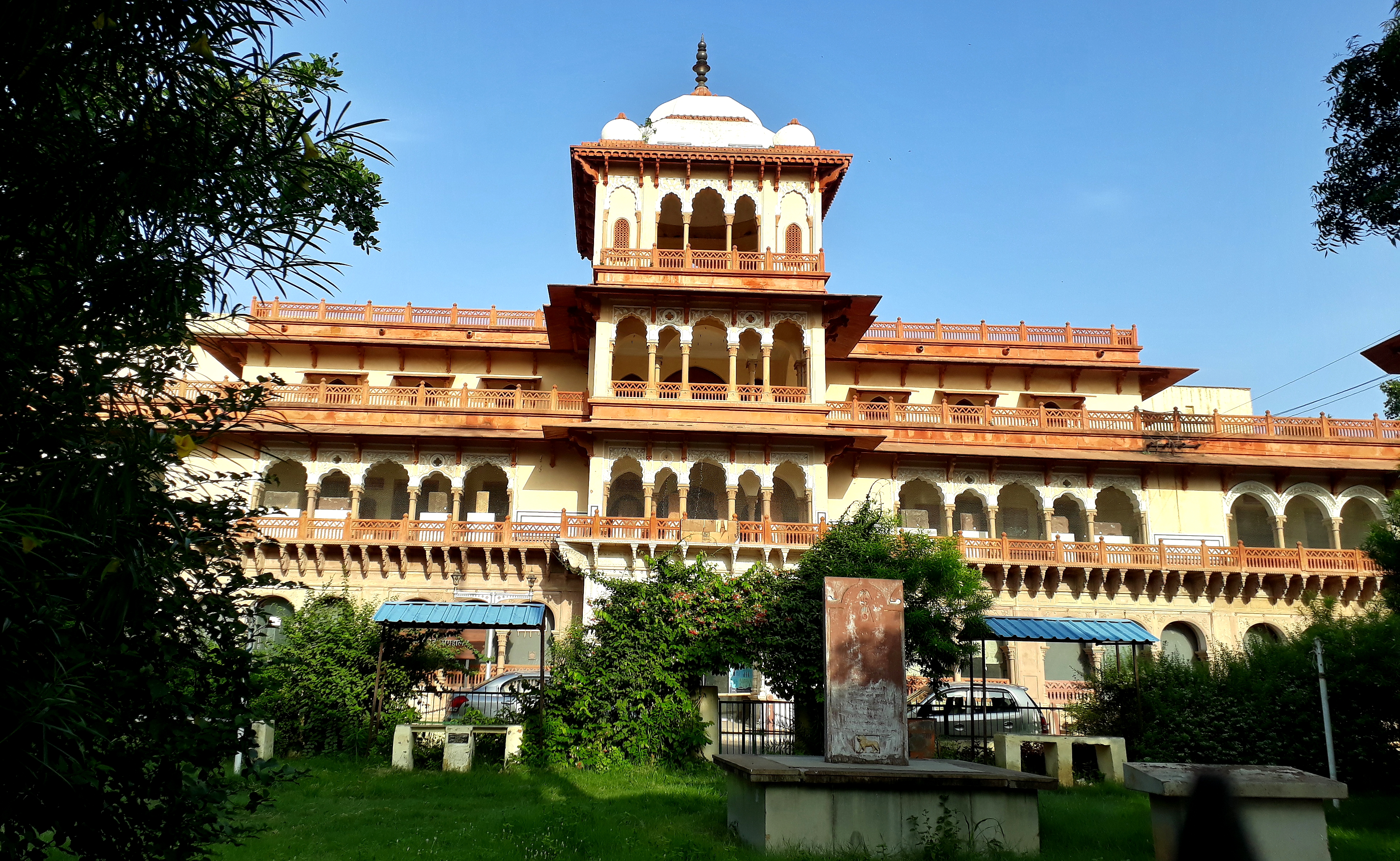
- Interactive map of the Garh Palace area

General information
- Location: Jhalawar, Bhoj Mohalla, Jhalawar, Rajasthan 326001, India, India
- Coordinates: 24.5962°N 76.1651°E
- Construction started: 1840
- Completed: 1845

Design and construction
- Main contractor: Madan Singh

The Garh (or Fort) Palace, Jhalawar, was a royal residence and former administrative headquarters of the rulers of the Jhalawar State in Jhalawar, Rajasthan, India.

== History ==
Upon Madan Singh's investiture as the Maharaj Rana of Jhalawar in 1838, he initially resided in Jhalrapatan. He began building the Garh Palace in 1840, and it was completed in 1845. Over the years, his successors made further additions to it. After India's independence, Harish Chandra Singh, the Maharaj Rana of Jhalawar at the time, leased the property to the government for administrative offices. This allowed Jhalawar to become a district with political representation.

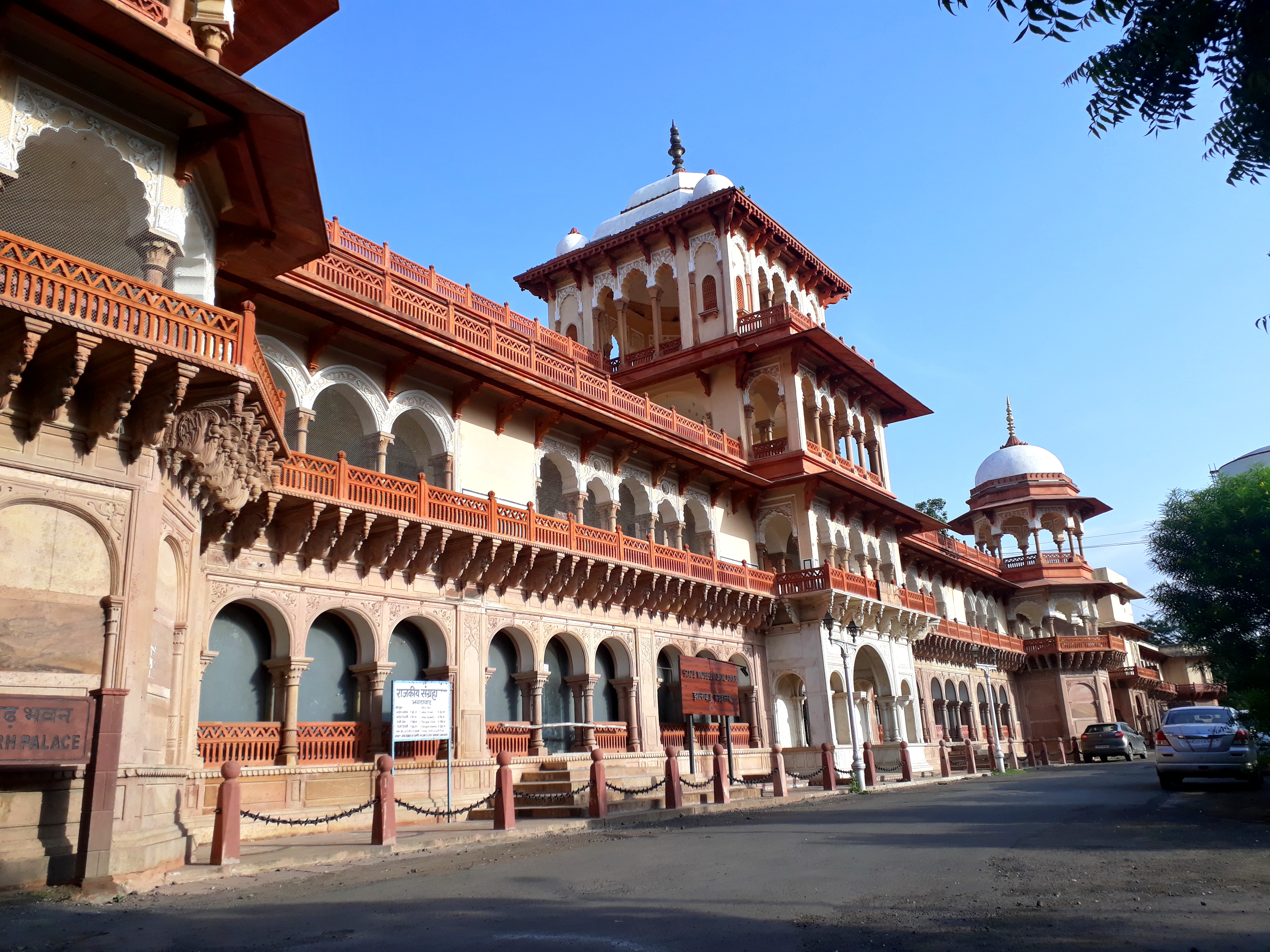
Garh Palace, Jhalawar

== Structures within the complex ==
It consists of several buildings, a temple, outhouses, stables, and a non-functional theater.

=== Mor Chowk ===
Mor Chowk, also known as the Peacock Courtyard, is famous for its peacock mosaics and is part of the museum.

=== Manak Mahal ===
Manak Mahal, also known as the Ruby Palace, is famous for its collection of glass and porcelain figures.

=== Krishna Vilas ===
Krishna Vilas is known for its collection of miniatures.

=== Bari Mahal ===
Bari Mahal is known for its central garden.

=== Moti Mahal ===
Moti Mahal, also called the Palace of Pearls, is famous for its intricate mirrorwork.

=== Chini Mahal ===
Chini Mahal is known for its ornamental tiles.

=== Zenana Khas ===
Zenana Khas, the private apartments of royal women, is renowned for its frescoes and mirrors, which are fine examples of the Hadoti School of Art.

=== Bhawani Natyashala ===
Bhawani Singh built a theater in Garh Palace in 1921. It was modeled after the opera houses he had seen abroad and was known for performances ranging from Shakespearean plays to Shakuntala dramas.

== Artworks ==
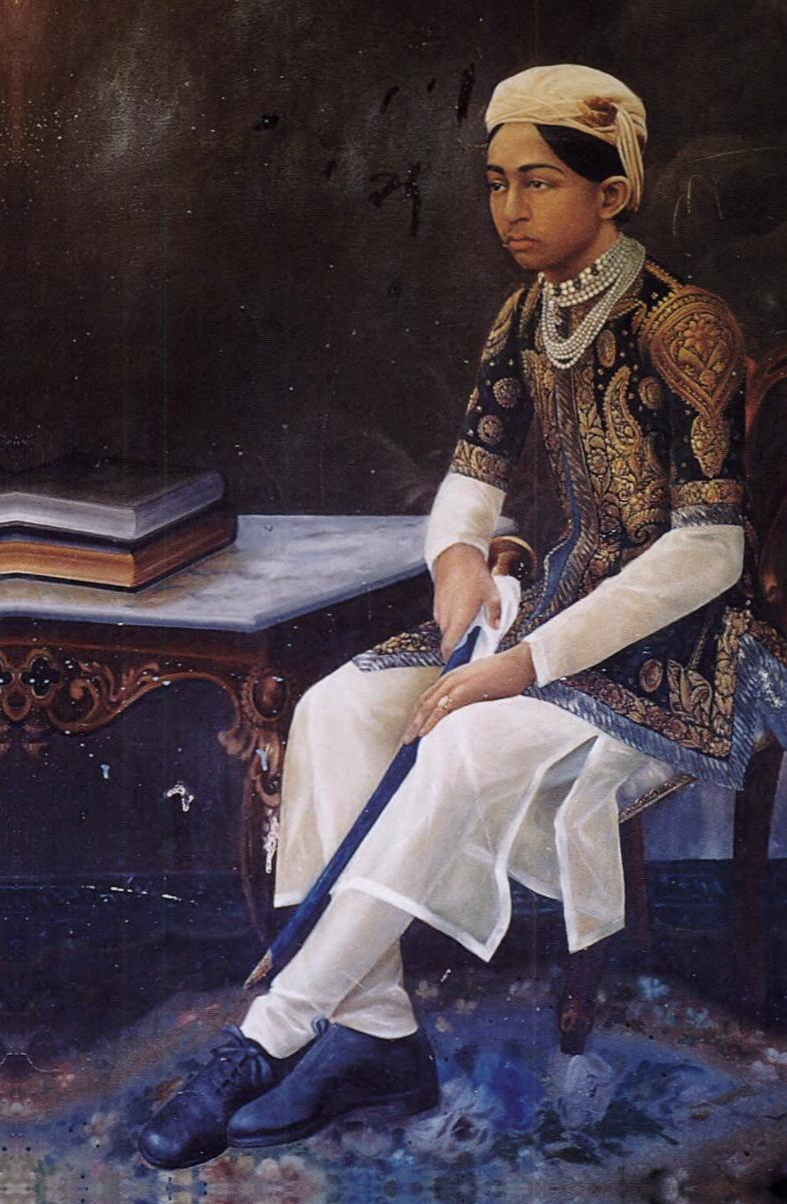
Zalim Singh II, by Ghasiram Hardev Sharma, at Garh Palace.

Ghasiram Hardev Sharma was the chief painter and head of photography for the Shrinathji Temple in Nathdwara. When his reputation for excellence reached Bhawani Singh, he requested Tilkayat Goverdhan Lal to allow Ghasiram to work for him in Jhalawar. Ghasiram was offered a monthly salary of 150 rupees, which was twice his earnings at Nathdwara. He stayed in Jhalawar for about 10 to 12 years, during which he created contemporary artworks in the Company Style of painting. He painted oil and tempera works on the walls of Garh Palace.

== Museum ==
Garh Palace has a museum established in 1915. It is one of the oldest museums in Rajasthan and houses rare manuscripts, paintings, coins, and idols. When the palace was vacated in 2008 by the district collectorate and police, the Archaeology and Museums Department of Rajasthan took over the Mardana section to expand the museum, which opened in 2012.
