= Jhala Madan Singh =

Musahib-i-Ala of Kotah from 1834 to 1838 and Maharaj Rana of Jhalawar from 1838 to 1845

Rana Madan Singh
- Maharaj Rana

Maharaj Rana of Jhalawar
- Reign: 1838 – 1845
- Coronation: 1 August 1838
- Investiture: 8 April 1838
- Predecessor: Position established
- Successor: Prithviraj Singh

Musahib-i-Ala of Kota
- Reign: 26 February 1834 – 1838
- Predecessor: Madho Singh
- Successor: Position abolished
- Born: 1807
- Died: 1845 (aged 37–38)
- Spouse: Chandrawatji (Sisodiniji) Suraj Kanwarji of Rampura in Malwa; Bhatiyaniji Ajab Kanwarji from Jaisalmer; Rathoreji Fateh Kanwarji of Badnor in Mewar
- Issue: Prithviraj Singh; Baiji Lal Udai Kanwarji m.to Rawat Ragho Das of Deogarh in Mewar
Names
- Madan Singh
- House: Jhalawar
- Dynasty: Jhala
- Father: Madho Singh

Madan Singh was the Jhala Rajput Musahib-i-Ala of the Hada Chauhan house of Kotah from the year 1834 to 1838 and the first Maharaj Rana of Jhalawar from 1838 until his death in 1845.

== Biography ==
Madan Singh was born in 1807 to Madho Singh, whom he succeeded in his office as Musahib-i-Ala and virtual regent of Kotah, along with his titles and lands, on 26 February 1834. Though young and inexperienced when he assumed office, he, unlike his father, maintained more amicable relations with Maharao Raja Ram Singh II of Kotah and was willing to consider the Maharao's preferences on various matters, except when asserting his own executive authority. However, the Maharao Raja began to overstep his boundaries and interfere with Madan's powers and duties. In June 1835, a civil dispute broke out between two wealthy bankers. Maharao Raja attempted to sway the Madan's decision in favor of one of them, which Ross, who took charge of the Hadauti Political Agency in November 1834, deemed inappropriate and forbade him from doing in the future. In July 1835, the Maharao Raja expressed to Ross that he was upset about Madan's absence from the Darbar he had held to celebrate Madan's birthday. Ross explained that Madan's absence was not meant to undermine the Maharao Raja's authority but was due to a fear for his life, as he had not invited the Political Agent to attend the Durbar. Due to this dual system of government, tensions and disagreements arose in Kotah between him and the Maharao Raja.

== Maharaj Rana of Jhalawar ==
After much discussion and some armed contests, Captain John Ludlow, representing the British Government, convinced Maharao Raja and Madan to reach a compromise. They both assented to the proposition of establishing a new principality for Madan. On 8 April 1838, a treaty was signed between Madan Singh and the British Government, leading to the formation of a new state for him named Jhalawar, which was created from one-third of the territory of Kotah and consisted of 17 parganas. At the same time, he acknowledged British supremacy, agreed to supply troops, and pay an annual tribute of Rs. 80,000. He was vested with the title of Maharaj Rana and granted a salute of fifteen guns. On 10 April 1838, Maharao Raja Ram Singh II signed a treaty with the British Government in which he agreed to cede seventeen parganas to the Madan. Madan Singh continued to hold office as the Musahib-i-Ala of Kotah till 27 April 1838.

=== Installation ===
Madan left Kotah for Jhalrapatan, which he had chosen as the capital of his new state, on 28 April 1838 and reached it on 2 May 1838. However, he fell sick, which delayed his installation on the throne of Jhalawar. After his recovery, his installation took place on 1 August 1838. On the occasion, Shah Manik Chank presented a khillat of investiture on behalf of the British Government, and in return, he presented a nazrana to the Governor-General.

=== Garh Palace, Jhalawar ===
Upon his investiture as Maharaj Rana of Jhalawar in 1838, he initially resided in Jhalrapatan. However, in 1840, he began constructing the Garh Palace, which was completed in 1845.

== Marriage ==
When he was fifteen years old, his grandfather, Zalim Singh, arranged his marriage in 1823 to the daughter of the Rao of Rampura. Feasts and festivities were organized on a grand scale, and the celebrations lasted for two months. The officers in general charge of the arrangements were Pandit Mahipat Rao and Pandit Krishnaji Tantiya. On this occasion, Maharo Raja Kishore Singh of Kotah and Lancelot Wilkinson were also invited. They were accommodated at Zalim Singh's residence in his estate at Nanta. Zalim Singh gave lavish presents, including diamond necklaces and bracelets, to Kishore Singh. Presents, including gold mohars and 678 luxurious robes, were gifted to all male and female members of the Kishore Singh family, whether close or distant, by Zalim Singh. Zalim Singh distributed cash and clothes to all the palace officials and servants, regardless of rank. In return, Kishore Singh spent three days at Nanta and presented gifts worth Rs. 1,497, which included 11 male robes and 28 female robes. Zalim Singh also invited many Maratha sardars, twelve of whom were particularly notable. Among these, five were jagirdars of Kotah, and there were also representatives from Daulat Rao Scindia and the Holkar. Amir Khan of Tonk also attended the wedding and presented the bridegroom with a gift of Rs. 500, a pearl necklace, and a sarpech.

== Death ==
He died in 1845 and was succeeded by his son, Prithviraj Singh, as the Maharaj Rana of Jhalawar.
