= Rajendra Singh of Jhalawar =

Maharaj Rana of Jhalawar from 1929 to 1943

Rajendra Singh

Maharaj Rana of Jhalawar
- Reign: 13 April 1929 – 2 September 1943
- Investiture: 13 April 1929
- Predecessor: Bhawani Singh
- Successor: Virendra Singh
- Born: 15 July 1900
- Died: 2 September 1943 (aged 43)
- Spouse: Hira Kunverba
- Issue: Virendra Singh
Names
- Rajendra Singh Jhala
- House: Jhalawar
- Dynasty: Jhala
- Father: Bhawani Singh

Lieutenant Sir Rajendra Singh KCSI was the Maharaj Rana of Jhalawar from 1929 until his death in 1943.

== Birth ==
He was born on 15 July 1900 to Bhawani Singh and his wife, the daughter of Maharaja Durjan Sal of Kherli.

== Education ==
He was educated at Mayo College in Ajmer where he remained from 1907 to 1919. In 1920, he came to Oxford, where he studied at New College and then at Christ Church.

== Reign ==
Upon the death of his father, Bhawani Singh, on 13 April 1929, he succeeded him as the Maharaj Rana of Jhalawar. He administered his state through a Prime Minister, a Dewan, and two Ministers. The state maintained five dispensaries and 42 schools, six of which were for girls. He was deeply interested in Harijan welfare and is said to have taken Harijans into the state temple. He reorganized the army and police, established a High Court, electrified the towns of Jhalawar and Jhalrapatan, constructed a bridge over the Chhoti Kāli Sindh River near Gangadhar, and improved roads and irrigation facilities.

== Military career ==
In 1926, he joined the 11/19th Hyderabad Regiment and was attached to it as an honorary second Lieutenant. He later resigned his commission in the Indian Territorial Force and was granted the honorary rank of Lieutenant in the regular army on 14 January 1931.

== Personal life ==
=== Marriage ===
He married Hira Kunverba, daughter of the Thakore of Kotda Sangani, on 6 September 1920.

=== Children ===
While at Oxford, a son, Virendra Singh, was born to them on 27 September 1921.

== Death ==
He died on 2 September 1943, after a reign of 13 years, and was succeeded by his son Virendra Singh (Harish Chandra) as the Maharaj Rana of Jhalawar.

== Titles and styles ==
- 1900 – 1929: Maharaj Kumar Shri Rajendra Singh
- 1929 – 1943: His Highness Dharam Divakar Prajavatsal Maharajadhiraj Maharaj Rana Shri Rajendra Singh Dev Bahadur, Maharaj Rana of Jhalawar
