= Bhawani Natyashala =

General information
- Location: Jhalawar, Rajasthan
- Country: India
- Completed: 1921
- Opened: 16 July 1921

Design and construction
- Architect(s): Thakur Umrao Singh
- Main contractor: Bhawani Singh

Bhawani Natyashala in Jhalawar, Rajasthan, India, was a public theatre built by Maharaj Rana of Jhalawar, Sir Bhawani Singh.

== History ==
Maharaj Rana of Jhalawar, Bhawani Singh, had a deep interest in various subjects and was particularly focused on promoting Western knowledge and culture within his state. He frequently visited the Western world, and in 1921 he built a theater modeled after the opera houses he had seen abroad, naming it Bhawani Natyashala after himself. It was designed and constructed under the orders and guidance of Bhawani Singh by Thakur Umrao Singh, Home and Military Member of the Jhalawar State Council. It was formally opened on 16 July 1921. It was known for its performances ranging from Shakespeare's plays to Shakuntala dramas.

=== Charles Doran ===
Charles Doran, an Irish actor, came to India in 1931 to become the director of Shakespeare's plays at the Bhawani Natyashala.

== Building and architecture ==
Its architectural style is a mix of Indian and European design. It was fitted with a remarkable acoustic system. It features special seating and a large stage capable of accommodating numerous performers, as well as elephants and horses.

== Restoration ==
Department of Archaeology & Museums, Rajasthan, commenced repair, restoration, and facelifting works of Bhawani Natyashala in September 2018 at a cost of ₹5,00,00,000. The project was completed in 2021, the year Bhawani Natyashala celebrated its 100th anniversary.

== Plays ==
Bhawani Natyashala staged productions of various notable plays such as Abhigyan Shakuntalam, Rana Pratap, Bhul Bhulaiyya, Mahabharat, and Raja Harish Chandra until 1950. However, very few plays were performed there after that.
