= Jhala Madho Singh =

Musahib-i-Ala of Kota from 1821 to 1834

Madho Singh Jhala
- Raj Rana
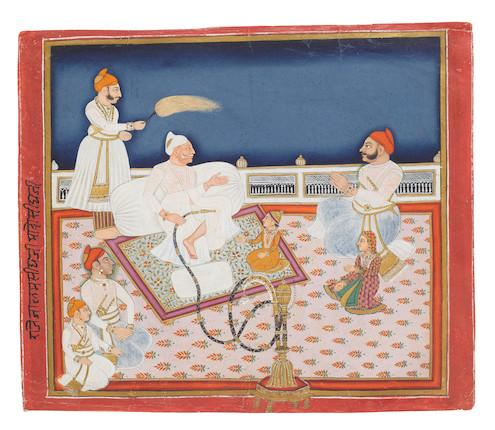
- Madho Singh being received by his father Zalim Singh

Musahib-i-Ala of Kota
- Reign: 1821 – 1834
- Predecessor: Zalim Singh
- Successor: Madan Singh
- Died: 1834
- Spouse: Hadiji (Chauhanji) Chain Kanwarji of Indragarh in Kota; Narukiji (Kachwahiji) Deep Kanwarji from Uniara in Jaipur
- Issue: Madan Singh
Names
- Madho Singh Jhala
- Dynasty: Jhala
- Father: Zalim Singh
- Religion: Hinduism

Jhala Madho Singh was the Musahib-i-Ala of Kota from 1821 to 1834 and an ancestor of the Maharaj Ranas of Jhalawar.

== Biography ==
He was born to Zalim Singh and his wife, the daughter of a Ranawat chieftain. When his father lost his eyesight and could no longer manage the business due to his poor health, he acted as faujdar, or commander, of the state troops of Kota on his behalf, while his father continued to oversee all important matters. When Zalim Singh had a paralysis attack, his son Madho took over his duties. During this time, the Maharao Raja of Kota, Kishore Singh, was not willing to give up his rights and privileges to rule his own country. With the advice of Prithvi Singh and Govardhan Das, Kishore Singh decided to recover his position by means of war in 1820 against Madho. However, with the intervention of James Tod, war was prevented. Through Tod's efforts, state affairs returned to normal, and public reconciliation was achieved between Kishore Singh, Zalim Singh, and Madho Singh. At Tod's request in 1820, Kishore Singh granted the customary khilat to Madho Singh.

Upon the death of his father, Zalim Singh, in 1821, he inherited the title, rank, and dignity of Musahib-i-Ala of Kota, as well as that of faujdar, without formal recognition from the Maharao Raja of Kota. He based his claim on the supplemental clause of the 1817 treaty between Kota and the British Government, which granted the entire administration of Kota to his father and his heirs in regular succession and perpetuity. He served as Musahib-i-Ala for ten years: four years under Kishore Singh's rule as Maharao Raja of Kota and six years during the rule of his adopted son, Ram Singh. He did not change the administration's structure, so his rule continued his father's administration.

He married and had a son, Madan Singh, who later established the new principality of Jhalawar.

== Death ==
He died in 1834 and was succeeded by his son, Madan Singh, as the Musahib-i-Ala of Kota.
