= Zalim Singh II =

Maharaj Rana of Jhalawar from 1875 to 1896

Maharaj Rana Zalim Singh II
- Maharaj Rana
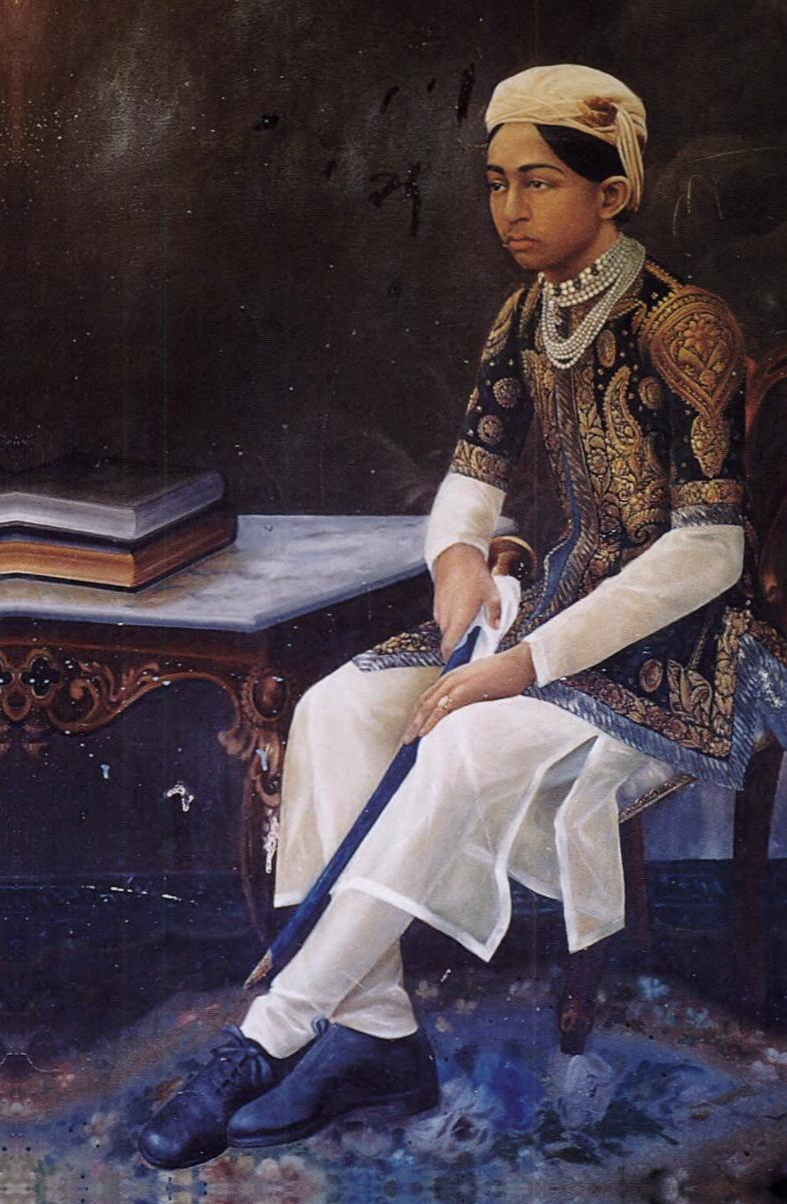

Maharaj Rana of Jhalawar
- Reign: 1 June 1876 – 22 March 1896
- Coronation: 24 June 1876
- Investiture: 21 February 1884
- Predecessor: Prithvi Singh
- Successor: Bhawani Singh
- Born: Kumarji Vakht Singh; 5 November 1864; Wadhawan, Wadhawan State Kathiawar, Gujarat
- Died: 8 October 1912 (aged 47); Varanasi, Benaras State
- Spouse: Maharaniji Rathoreji Kishan Kanwarji of Kishangarh State; Maharaniji Gohelji of Limbda in Gujarat
Names
- Zalim Singh II
- House: Jhalawar (by adoption); Wadhwan (by birth)
- Dynasty: Jhala
- Father: Prithvi Singh (adoptive); Kumarji Saheb Kesari Sinh of Wadhawan(biological)
- Mother: Jadejiji of Morvi State

Maharaj Rana Zalim Singh II was the third Jhala Rajput ruler of Jhalawar in the British Raj from the year 1875 until his deposition in 1896.

== Birth ==
Rana Zalim Singh, originally born as Kumarji Saheb Wakht Sinhji in the year 1864, was the son of Kumarji Saheb Kesari Sinhji, the second son of Thakore Saheb Rai Sinhji of Wadhwan in Gujarat.He was adopted from the place keeping in view with the fact the succession at Jhalawar continue from the original parent branch, the Wadhawan branch of Jhala Rajputs.

== Education ==
He was educated at the Mayo College in Ajmer.

== Adoption ==
Maharaj Rana Prithvi Singh of Jhalawar, who had no male child of his own, adopted Bakht Singh, aged 9, from the Jhala family of Wadhwan, in 1873. Bakht Singh was related to him in the ninth degree.

== Succession ==
When Maharaj Rana Prithvi Singh died on 29 August 1875, the question of succession remained undecided for some time due to the rumored pregnancy of his widow; however, no child was born to her. On 1 June 1876, Bakht Singh was acknowledged as the successor to the late Prithvi Singh and was installed as the Maharaj Rana of Jhalawar on 24 June 1876. On this occasion, he took the name Zalim Singh in accordance with family custom.

== Reign ==
At the time of his accession, he was a minor, so the state was placed under the superintendence of a British officer. On his coming of age in November 1883, he was invested with full administrative powers over his state on 21 February 1884. However, he had to follow certain rules: he needed to consult the Political Agent about important matters and heed his advice, and he had to obtain the Political Agent's approval before making any significant changes or altering the current operations. But he failed to administer his government in accordance with these principles. In September 1887, the Government of India withdrew his powers and restored the arrangements that were in force during his minority. In November 1992, he was again entrusted with some departments of the administration, when he promised reform. However, he failed to govern the state properly and was deposed on 22 March 1896.

Following this, he went on to live in Varanasi on a pension of £2,000 (Rs. 30,000), and the administration of the state was placed in the hands of a British resident. A major portion of the territories ceded by the Kota State by the Treaty of 1838 to form the Jhalawar State was reverted to them in 1897, as Zalim Singh I's heirs and successors had failed after his deposition. With the remaining portion, a new state was formed, of which Bhawani Singh was made the first ruler in 1899.

== Marriages ==
He married twice: first, in 1886, to a sister of Maharaja Sir Sadul Singh of Kishangarh, and secondly, a few months later, to a daughter of the Thakur of Limri from the Gohil family in Kathiawar. He had no children.

== Death ==
He died in Varanasi on the 8 October 1912.
