= Bhawani Singh of Jhalawar =

Maharaj Rana of Jhalawar from 1899 to 1929

Bhawani Singh
- Maharaj Rana
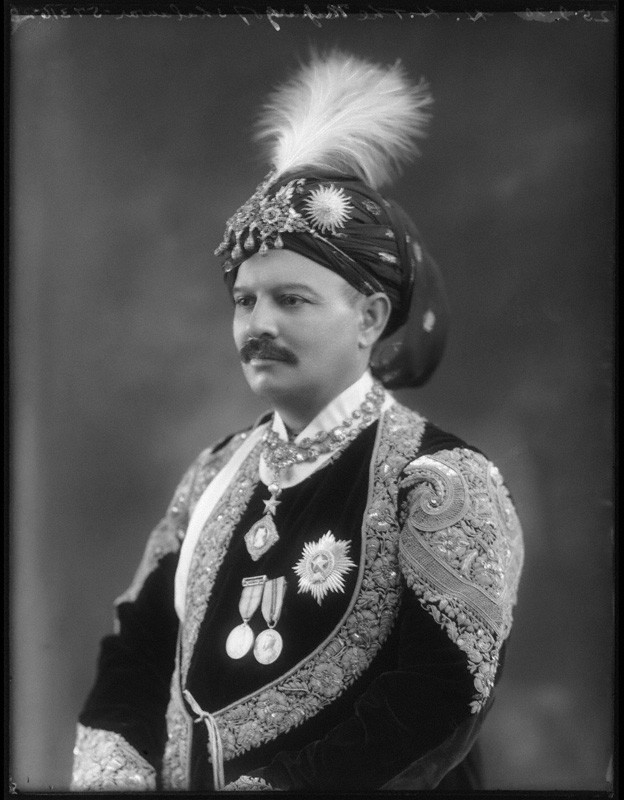
- Portrait of Bhawani Singh

Maharaj Rana of Jhalawar
- Reign: 6 February 1899 – 13 April 1929
- Investiture: 6 February 1899
- Predecessor: Zalim Singh II
- Successor: Rajendra Singh
- Born: 4 September 1874; Fatehpur, Jhalawar State, British India
- Died: 13 April 1929 (aged 54); Aden, Yemen
- Issue: Rajendra Singh
Names
- Bhawani Singh Jhala
- House: Jhalawar
- Dynasty: Jhala
- Father: Chhatrasal Jhala

Sir Bhawani Singh KCSI (4 September 1874 – 13 April 1929) was the Maharaj Rana of Jhalawar from 1899 until his death.

== Birth ==
Bhawani Singh was born on 4 September 1874 to Thakur Chhatrasal of Fatehpur, a descendant of Madho Singh, the first Jhala Foujdar of the Kota State troops.

== Education ==
He received his education at Mayo College, Ajmer, which he entered in 1881 and left in 1891. During his time there, he excelled in both academics and outdoor sports. Following the completion of his education, he was employed by the Jhalawar State Police.

== Succession ==
On 22 March 1896, Zalim Singh II was deposed due to his inability to govern Jhalawar effectively. Following this, the Government of India reconstructed the Jhalawar State by restoring a significant portion of the tracts ceded by Kota State in 1838 to create the principality of Jhalawar on 1 January 1899. At the same time, the title was reduced from Maharaj Rana to Raj Rana, and the gun salute was decreased from 15 to 11 guns. Thus, a new state was formed, of which Bhawani Singh was installed as the first chief and invested with full powers on 6 February 1899 by Sir Arthur Martindale, the then Governor-General's Agent in Rajputana.

== Reign ==
One of his first acts upon assuming the reins of the administration was the grant of remission of Rs. 3,64,627 in the arrears of rent owed to the State. After his investiture, he also had to deal with the Indian famine of 1899–1900, which had struck Jhalawar. He personally supervised the relief work. He quickly set up shelters for the poor, saving thousands of lives. At the same time, he brought in a large quantity of food grains from the United Provinces of Agra and Oudh, which were sold to government workers and the public at prices significantly lower than those people were paying at the time. He remitted the arrears of rent amounting to about four lacs to the subjects. He adopted the Imperial Postal Union and British currency and weights in his state. He introduced the Nāgarī script in the courts and offices of the state and remitted a number of petty, vexatious taxes. He promoted social improvements such as the removal of untouchability, supported widow remarriage, and encouraged education for girls. He established several Mofussil and girls' schools. Education in all schools, including the high school, was provided free of charge, and books and other school materials were distributed gratis. The initiatives he undertook to encourage female education led to significant improvements in female literacy. His state had the highest number of educated women in India, and The Indian Ladies' Magazine praised him, stating that he had done more for female education than any other Indian ruler.

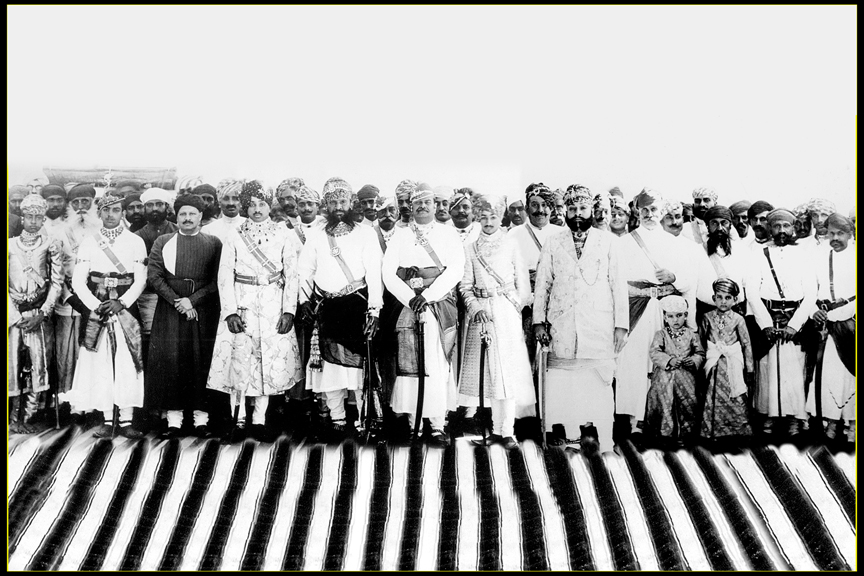
Bhawani Singh with other Indian royals at Govind Nath Ji's temple at Moti Mahal, Bundi, in 1921.

In 1908, he was appointed Knight Commander of the Most Exalted Order of the Star of India and received the insignia at the investiture held in Calcutta in February 1909.

In 1912, during his time in London, he studied the methods of the UK Parliament. After returning to Jhalawar, he introduced a constitutional government but kept considerable power for himself.

== Delhi Durbars ==
He attended the Delhi Durbars of 1903 and 1911.

== Overseas trips ==
=== Visit to Europe ===
In 1904, he visited Europe for the benefit of his health, accompanied by Major R.A.E. Benn. After visiting England and most of the countries in Europe, he returned to India in November of that year. He recorded his experiences on that occasion in a diary, which he published in 1912 primarily for the benefit of his subjects in a book titled Travel Pictures: The Record of a European Tour. On 11 May 1904, Martin Gosselin informed him, while he was in Lisbon, that he would be presented to Carlos I of Portugal the following day in Sintra. He proceeded to Sintra immediately, and the next day, Gosselin accompanied him to the palace, where he had an audience with Carlos I. While in England, Curzon Wyllie called him and invited him to Buckingham Palace, where a court was to be held on 20 May 1904. There, he was received in audience by Edward VII, who treated him with the utmost consideration. While in London, Bhawani Singh inspected the new premises of The Bystander on Tallis Street. On 18 June 1904, he laid a wreath at the Royal Mausoleum, Frogmore, the tomb of Queen Victoria and her husband, Prince Albert, the Prince Consort. Later, while in Mariánské Lázně, he frequently encountered Edward VII.

=== Visit to England ===
In 1912, he arrived in England for an extended stay, accompanied by a group of officials, including Pandit Shyam Shankar. He regularly attended the International Commission meetings on Maritime Meteorology and Weather Telegraphy, held in London that September. He visited Cambridge that year, where he was hosted for lunch and later for dinner at Newnham College.

== World War I ==
During World War I, he placed all the resources of his state at the disposal of the Government of India and offered his personal services. He organized weekly lectures for his people during the war to spread correct information and counter the rumors. The title of Maharaj Rana was conferred on him on 1 January 1918, as a hereditary distinction for his services in connection with the war. Also, the salute of his state was raised from 11 to 13 guns on 1 January 1921.

== Bhawani Natyashala ==
He built Bhawani Natyashala in 1921 for the performance of plays and cultural events, inspired by the opera houses he had seen in Europe.

== Art patronage ==
Ghasiram Hardev Sharma was an artist associated with the Shrinathji Temple in Nathdwara, Rajasthan. In 1916-17, during Bhawani Singh's visit to Nathdwara, he learned about Ghasiram and offered him a salary double what he was earning there, convincing him to move to Jhalawar. Ghasiram remained at the Jhalawar court for approximately 10 to 12 years. During his time in Jhalawar, he created exceptional mural paintings, portraits, and fully painted rooms at the Garh Palace.

== Personal life ==
=== Marriage ===
He was married in 1894 to the daughter of Maharaja Durjan Sal of Kherti, under Kota State.

=== Children ===
He had a son, Rajendra Singh, born to him on 13 July 1900.

== Death ==
He died on board the mail steamer Ranpura near Aden on April 13, 1929, while traveling to Europe for treatment of heart trouble. He was succeeded by his only son, Rajendra Singh, as Maharaj Rana of Jhalawar.

== Honours ==
Country	Year	Honour	Class/Grade	Ribbon	Post-nominal letters
British India	1903	Delhi Durbar Medal (1903)	Gold		
British India	1911	Delhi Durbar Medal (1911)	Gold		
United Kingdom	1908	Order of the Star of India	Knight Commander		KCSI
