= Jhalawar =

City in Rajasthan, India

- City
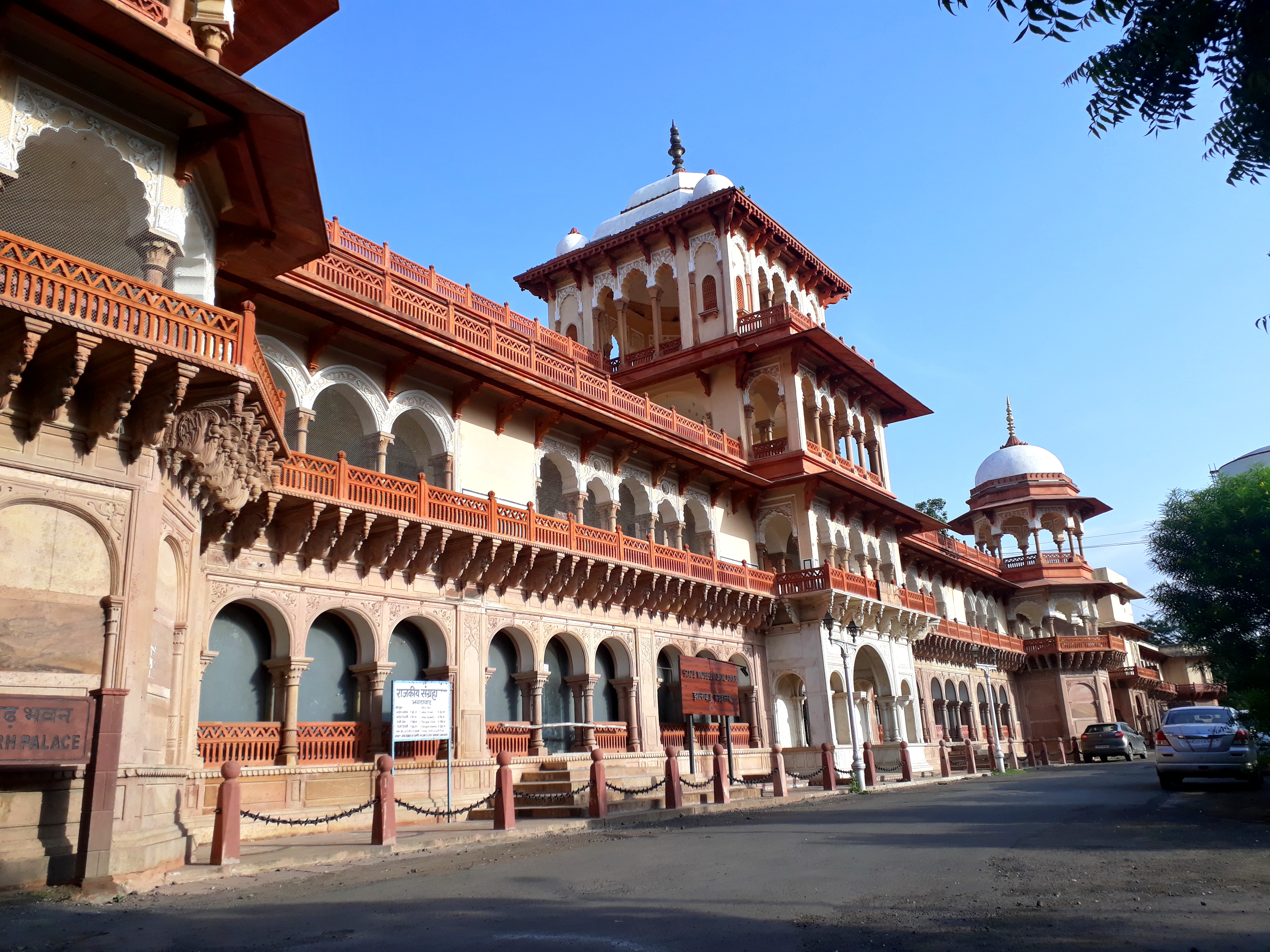
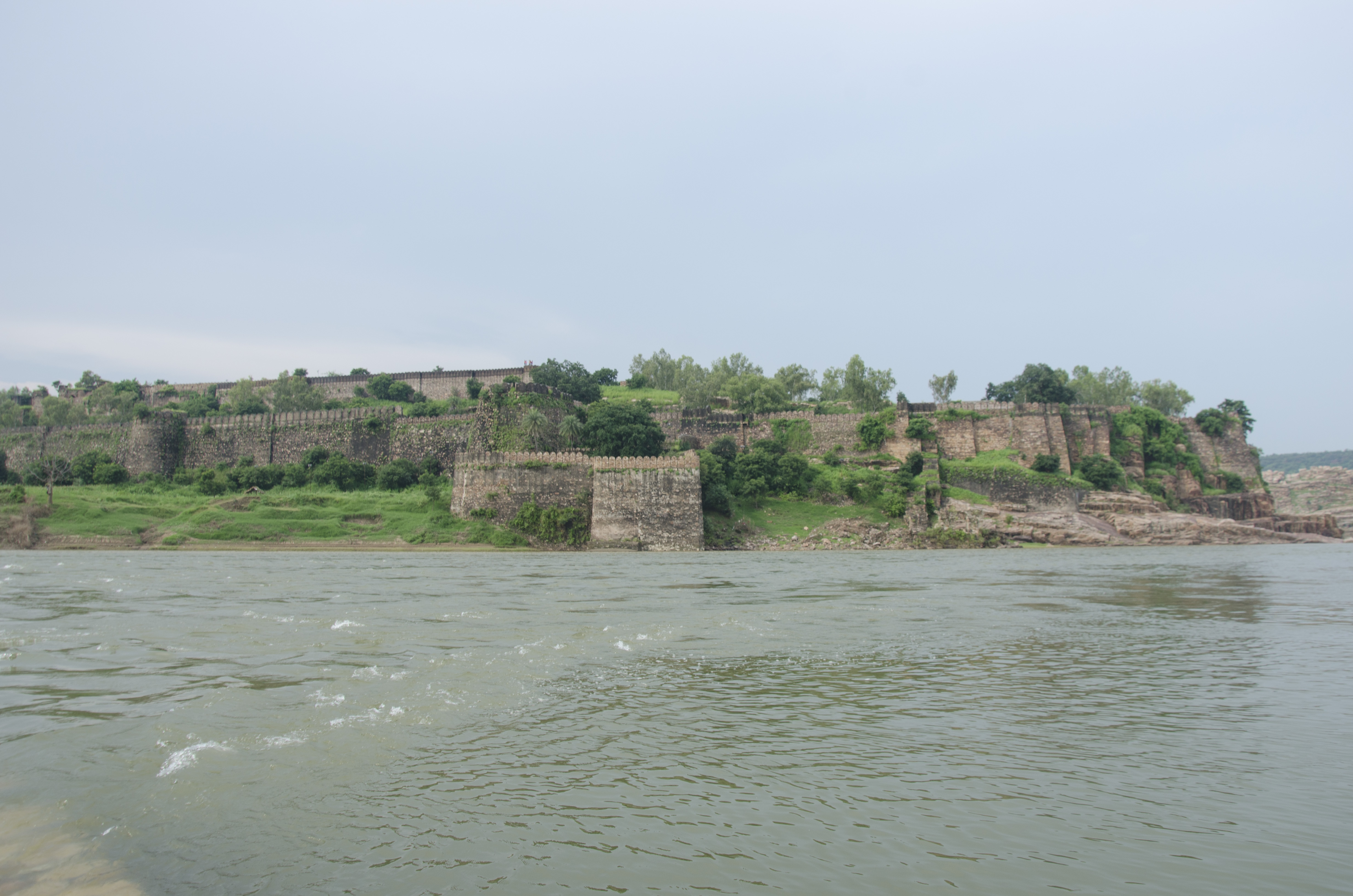
- Garh Palace, Gagron Fort
- Nicknames: The Purple City, The Cherrapunji of Rajasthan
- Interactive map of Jhalawar
- Location in Rajasthan, India Jhalawar (India) Jhalawar (Asia)
- Coordinates: 24.59°N 76.16°E
- Country: India
- State: Rajasthan
- District: Jhalawar
- Division: Kota
- Named for: Jhala Zalim Singh

Government
  - Type: Municipal Council
  - Body: Jhalawar Municipal Council

Area
  - Total: 115 km^{2} (44 sq mi)
- Elevation: 312 m (1,024 ft)

Population (2011)
  - Total: 66,919
  - Density: 582/km^{2} (1,510/sq mi)

Languages
  - Official: Hindi, English
  - Native: Hadoti
- Time zone: UTC+5:30 (IST)
- Postal code: 326xxx
- Vehicle registration: RJ-17

Jhalawar ([dʒʱaːlaːʋaːɽ]) is a city, municipal council and headquarter in Jhalawar district of the Indian state of Rajasthan. It is located in the southeastern part of the state. It was the capital of the former princely state of Jhalawar, and is the administrative headquarters of Jhalawar District. Jhalawar was once known as Brijnagar.

== History ==
The city of Jhalawar was founded by a Rajput, Jhala Zalim Singh, who was then the Dewan of Kota State (1791 A.D.). He established this township, then known as Chaoni Umedpura, as a cantonment. The township was at the time surrounded by dense forests and wildlife.

Singh often came here for hunting and he liked the place so much that he wanted to develop it as a township. The objective to develop this place as a military cantonment was due to the fact that Maratha invaders passed through this central place from Malwa towards Kota to capture Hadoti states.

Singh recognised the importance of this place and started to develop it as a military cantonment and township, so that he could use this place to attack and stop Maratha invaders before they could reach Kota state. Chaoni Umedpura was developed as a cantonment and township around 1803-04 A.D. Colonel Todd, who visited the region in December 1821 described this area as the cantonment established by Jhala Zalim Singh plus a well-established township with large houses, havelis and surrounding walls.

In 1838 A.D., English rulers separated Jhalawar state from Kota state and gave it to Jhala Madan Singh, the grandson of Jhala Zalim Singh. He developed his administration services to develop the state of Jhalawar. He resided in Jhalara Patan for a long time and started to build the Garh Palace (1840 – 1845 A.D). He was the first ruler of Jhalawar state and made a significant contribution in the history of Jhalawar. Jhala Madan Singh ruled Jhalawar from 1838 to 1845. After his death, Jhala Prithvi Singh became the ruler of Jhalawar and ruled for around 30 years.

A municipality was established at Jhalawar in 1883.

Rana Bhawani Singh, who ruled Jhalawar state from 1899 to 1929 A.D., did remarkable work in the development of Jhalawar state. His active involvement was in the fields of social activities, public works (construction), education and administration.

The chief town of Jhalawar, also known as Patan or Jhalara Patan, was the centre of trade for the eponymous princely state, the chief exports of which were opium, oil-seeds and cotton. The palace is four miles (6 km) north of the town. The finest feature of its remains is the temple of Sitaleswar Mahadeva (c. 600).

== Princely state of Jhalawar ==
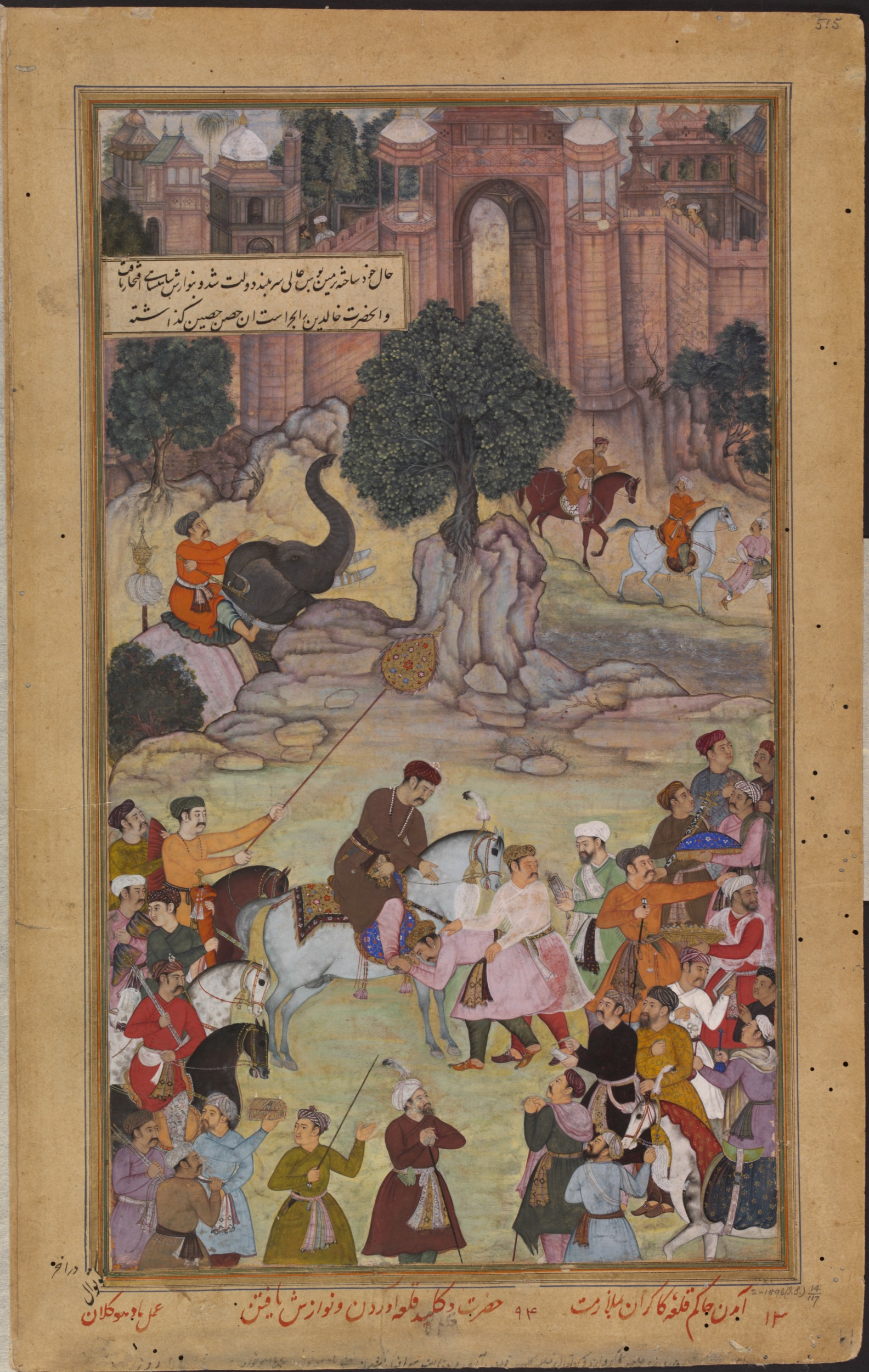
1561 - The governor of Gagraun fort surrenders the keys to Akbar.

The former ruling family of Jhalawar belonged to the Jhala family of Rajputs. At Kota Madhu Singh, a Jhala Rajput became a favourite with the Maharaja, and received from him an important post, which became hereditary. On the death of one of the Kota rajas (1771), the state was left to the charge of Jhala Zalim Singh, a descendant of Madhu Singh.

From that time Zalim Singh was the de facto ruler of Kota. Under his administration, which lasted over forty-five years, the Kota territory was respected by all parties. In 1838 AD, British intervention and internal politics resulted with the decision to dismember the Kota state, and to create the new principality of Jhalawar as a separate provision for the descendants of Jhala Zalim Singh. The districts then severed from Kota were considered to represent one-third (£120,000) of the income of Kotah; by treaty they acknowledged the supremacy of the British, and agreed to pay an annual tribute of £8,000. Madan Singh received the title of Maharaja Rana, and was placed on the same footing as the other chiefs in Rajputana.

== Geography ==
Jhalawar is located at 24.6°N 76.15°E. It has an average elevation of 312 metres (1023 feet).

== Climate ==
The climate of the area is similar to the Indo-Gangetic plain, being classified as a monsoon-influenced humid subtropical climate (Cwa) by the Köppen system. In summer the temperature generally is around 40 °C (104 °F) and at maximum can exceed 45 °C (113 °F). In winter the coldest temperature can reach 1 °C (34 °F). Jhalawar district has the highest rainfall in the Rajasthan state. An average of 37 inches (940 mm) of rainfall keeps it cool and gentle breezes ward off the stifling humidity.

Climate data for Jhalawar (1981–2010, extremes 1929–2012)
Month	Jan	Feb	Mar	Apr	May	Jun	Jul	Aug	Sep	Oct	Nov	Dec	Year
Record high °C (°F)	33.7 (92.7)	38.6 (101.5)	43.6 (110.5)	46.4 (115.5)	49.3 (120.7)	47.6 (117.7)	44.4 (111.9)	40.2 (104.4)	39.4 (102.9)	40.0 (104.0)	38.0 (100.4)	33.6 (92.5)	49.3 (120.7)
Mean daily maximum °C (°F)	22.9 (73.2)	27.0 (80.6)	32.8 (91.0)	38.9 (102.0)	42.5 (108.5)	39.4 (102.9)	32.7 (90.9)	30.4 (86.7)	32.0 (89.6)	33.1 (91.6)	29.1 (84.4)	24.2 (75.6)	32.1 (89.8)
Mean daily minimum °C (°F)	9.2 (48.6)	11.9 (53.4)	17.3 (63.1)	22.2 (72.0)	27.1 (80.8)	27.1 (80.8)	24.9 (76.8)	23.8 (74.8)	23.0 (73.4)	18.8 (65.8)	14.2 (57.6)	9.8 (49.6)	19.1 (66.4)
Record low °C (°F)	−0.6 (30.9)	1.7 (35.1)	5.0 (41.0)	12.6 (54.7)	18.4 (65.1)	17.5 (63.5)	18.6 (65.5)	17.0 (62.6)	14.2 (57.6)	10.0 (50.0)	5.4 (41.7)	1.2 (34.2)	−0.6 (30.9)
Average rainfall mm (inches)	2.8 (0.11)	1.4 (0.06)	1.3 (0.05)	0.8 (0.03)	7.4 (0.29)	93.6 (3.69)	316.0 (12.44)	353.4 (13.91)	127.3 (5.01)	25.7 (1.01)	9.4 (0.37)	2.2 (0.09)	941.3 (37.06)
Average rainy days	0.3	0.2	0.2	0.1	0.6	4.5	10.1	11.7	6.0	1.1	0.7	0.3	35.8
Average relative humidity (%) (at 17:30 IST)	41	33	24	21	22	39	63	75	61	42	38	42	43
Source: India Meteorological Department

== Demographics ==
As of the 2011 Indian Census, Jhalawar had a total population of 66,919, of which 34,765 were males and 32,154 were females. Population within the age group of 0 to 6 years was 8,919. The total number of literates in Jhalawar was 48,145, which constituted 71.95% of the population with male literacy was 77.9% and female literacy was 65.5%. The effective literacy rate of 7+ population 83.0%, of which male literacy rate was 90.1% and female literacy rate was 75.4%. The Scheduled Castes and Scheduled Tribes population was 11,422 and 3,534 respectively. Jhalawar had 13595 households in 2011.

== Education ==
Jhalawar district has a well-developed education infrastructure. The Department of Primary Education and Department of Secondary Education provide their services through primary schools, middle schools, secondary, and senior secondary schools. The Rajiv Gandhi Pathashala (School) Scheme, run by the Government of Rajasthan, is also running in the district to provide primary education. Government Engineering College, Jhalawar is a notable institution.Jhalawar also have govt Medical College established since 2008 with 200 MBBS seats and approximately 92 MD/MS seats.

== Sports ==
Jhalawar district has a multi-sports stadium named Government Khel Sankul.

== Notable places ==
- Gagron Fort, included in the UNESCO World Heritage List in 2013
- Kalisindh Dam
- Kalisindh Thermal Power Station
- Kolvi Caves
- Sun temple, Jhalrapatan: The 11th/12th-century Sun temple of Jhalprapatan is situated in the centre of the town. The temple is intact and divided into a sanctum, vestibule, prayer hall, and entrance. The most significant part of the temple is its big spire. The temple is adorned with several sculptures of gods and goddesses, and floral designs both from inside and outside of the pillars of the prayer hall are carved and decorated with sculptures. The temple has entrances on three sides, and every entrance has a toran over it. The sanctum is plain and simple. The outer walls of the sanctum display the icons of Dikpalas Surya, sur-sundris. Ganesh and other miniature scenes are related to the life of the people. At present, the image of the god Padmnabh of the 19th century is under worship and kept in the sanctum. Sometime in the 19th century the roof of the prayer hall was repaired and a few cenotaphs were constructed in the Rajput architectural style. The images of saints and monkeys were also installed on the roof.
- Chandkheri Jain Temple, Khanpur: Chandkheri is a 17th Century Jain Temple constructed by Bhattaraka Jagatkeertiji. The temple is known for its architecture. This temple is dedicated to Adinatha (Rishabhanatha) and the moolnayak of the temple is a 6.25 feet idol of Adinatha in padmasan posture made up of red stone. The idol said to be more than 1500 years old. It is said that there is an idol of Bhagwan Chandra Prabhu made of jewels, but it is closed by a wall now. The temple also has a Dharamshala equipped with all modern facilities along with a bhojanalya.
- Shri 1008 Shantinath Digambar Jain temple, Jhalrapatan: Shantinath Jain Temple was built in the 11th century. The temple has fine carvings and sculptures. Jain Temple is decorated with two white elephants at the entry point of the main temple.
- Kamkheda Balaji Mandir, Manoharthana is a famous Hanuman Ji Maharaj temple where many devotees from Rajasthan, Madhya Pradesh and many other states come throughout the year. It is said that every wish made with a true heart is fulfilled here. Recently Ram Mandir was built in front of Balaji Dham and opened to the public.
- Shitleshwar Mahadev Temple

== Transport ==
=== Air ===
The nearest airport with scheduled commercial flight is Kota. Kota airport operates a single flight to Jaipur and New Delhi six days a week (not on Sundays). It is 82 km from the town of Jhalawar.

The alternate airport with scheduled commercial flights is Raja Bhoj Airport at Bhopal and Devi Ahilya Bai Holkar Airport at Indore in Madhya Pradesh. Kolana Airport is located near Jhalawar. It is used by chartered aircraft.

=== Rail ===
Jhalawar City railway station (JLWC) is the primary railway station connecting the city to the WCR network. The railway station is two km (1.2 mi) from Jhalawar. Currently, there are three trains to Kota on a daily basis with convenient timings. On Sunday, Wednesday and Thursday a train to Jaipur and Ganganagar also runs.

=== Road ===
Jhalawar town lies on National Highway No. 52. Many government buses go through the district and outside. Private buses are also available for intrastate and interstate travel.

== Thermal power station ==
Kalisindh Thermal Power Station is 12 kilometres (7 mi) from Jhalawar town. The power plant is operated by Rajasthan Rajya Vidyut Utpadan Nigam. Its chimney is 275 metres (902 ft) high. The two cooling towers of the facility are 202 metres (663 ft), the tallest in the world. The EPC contractor for the project is BGR Energy Systems Ltd.

== Notable people ==
- Om Puri
- Vasundhara Raje
- Mohan lal Sukhariya
- Dushyant Singh
- Annu Kapoor

== Culture and Festivals ==
Jhalawar is known for its vibrant Hadoti culture. The most prominent event is the Chandrabhaga Fair, held annually in the month of Kartik (October/November) on the banks of the Chandrabhaga River. Thousands of pilgrims take a holy dip in the river, and the fair is famous for its large-scale livestock trading, attracting traders from across Rajasthan and neighboring Madhya Pradesh.
