= Durbar of 1870 =

Government event in British India

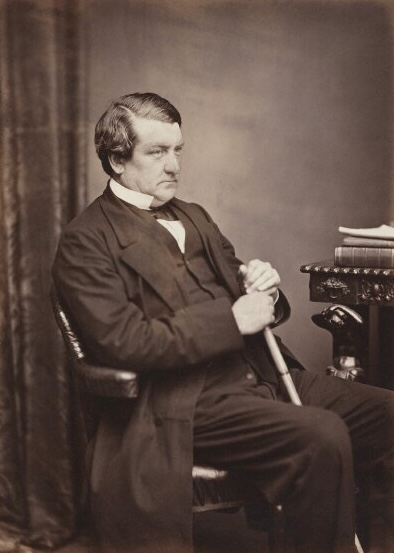
- Lord Mayo
- Date: 22 October 1870; 155 years ago
- Location: Ajmer
- Participants: Richard Bourke, 6th Earl of Mayo; Shambhu Singh; Ram Singh II; Takht Singh; Ram Singh; Ibrahim Ali Khan; Prithwi Singh; Prithviraj Singh; Nahar Singh

The Viceregal Durbar (lit. 'Court of Viceroy') was an assembly organized by Richard Bourke, the Viceroy and Governor-General of India, at Ajmer, on 22 October 1870. The purpose of this assemblage was to present to the rulers and nobles of Rajputana the proposal of founding an institution for the education of their sons.

== Prelude ==
When a durbar was to be organised at Ajmer by Lord Mayo, the Government of India invited the rulers of the princely states of Rajputana to attend. The invitation addressed to the Maharana of Udaipur provoked opposition within his state. His nobles, feudatories, and vassals considered attendance at a public durbar to be inconsistent with the dignity and traditions of the House of Mewar. They further argued that the meeting between Jawan Singh and Lord William Bentinck in 1832 had been private in nature, and that assurances had been given that the Maharana would not subsequently be required to meet the Viceroy outside his own territory. Despite these objections, the Maharana agreed to attend. Prior to his arrival in Ajmer, he wrote to Colonel J. C. Brooke, Agent to the Governor-General in Rajputana, stating that it would give him great pleasure to meet Lord Mayo there, and requesting that the same honours and ceremonial observances as were accorded to his predecessor in 1832 be maintained. He also asked that he should not be required to present nazrana in person to the Viceroy, and that any formal interview with him should not take place in the public durbar. In reply to the Maharana, Brooke stated that the political situation in India had changed since 1832. He also told him that authority now rested with the Viceroy, who acts on behalf of the Crown rather than the East India Company, and that the Viceroy was therefore entitled to honours equivalent to those accorded to the sovereign. Brooke nevertheless assured the Maharana that his rank and dignity would receive due consideration, and that the ceremonial arrangements would reflect his status.

The following rulers came to attend it:

State	Name	References
Udaipur	Shambhu Singh	
Jaipur	Ram Singh II	
Jodhpur	Takht Singh	
Bundi	Ram Singh	
Karauli		
Kotah	Shatru Sal II	
Tonk	Ibrahim Ali Khan	
Kishangarh	Prithwi Singh	
Jhalawar	Prithviraj Singh	
Shahpura	Nahar Singh	

Lord Mayo himself arrived in Ajmer on the afternoon of 20 October 1870, via Bharatpur, Jaipur, and Sambhar. Upon his arrival, he was received at the entrance of the city by the rulers, who had especially gathered for the durbar, and was escorted in state through Ajmer to the residency. On 21 October 1870, the next day, he received private visits from the assembled rulers. The tent in which the durbar was to be held was brought from Agra.

== Proceedings ==
On 22 October 1870, the durbar was held by Lord Mayo. It was attended by the rulers of Rajputana, along with civil and military officers, nobles, and local dignitaries. The Maharana of Udaipur was accompanied by nine principal nobles, the Maharaja of Jodhpur by nine, the Rajadhiraj of Shahpura by two, and other rulers of Rajputana by six each. The rulers arrived in the following manner: first, the ruler of Shahpura at 7:30 a.m., followed by the ruler of Jhalawar at 7:40 a.m., and subsequently, at ten-minute intervals, the rulers of Tonk, Kishangarh, Kotah, Bundi, and Udaipur. The Maharana of Udaipur was received at the tent entrance and escorted to his seat by the Agent to the Governor-General, the Foreign Secretary, the Private Secretary to Lord Mayo, and an aide-de-camp. Other rulers were received by the Under-Secretary in the Foreign Department and two aides-de-camp of Lord Mayo, while the ruler of Shahpura was received by an assistant to the Governor-General's agent and an aide-de-camp.

Seating on the right of Lord Mayo was arranged in the following order: the Maharana of Udaipur, the Foreign Secretary, the Under-Secretary in the Foreign Department, the Maharao Raja of Bundi, the Maharao Raja of Kotah, the Maharaja of Kishangarh, the Nawab of Tonk, the Maharaj Rana of Jhalawar, and the Rajadhiraj of Shahpura. Nobles accompanying each ruler were seated behind them, followed by the chieftains of Istimrari estates, the vakils of absent rulers, the Mir Munshi of the Rajputana Agency, and other local dignitaries.

After all attendees were seated, Lord Mayo entered the tent, accompanied by the Secretary and Under-Secretary in the Foreign Department, his private and military secretaries, and personal staff. A salute was fired, the troops presented arms, and the band played "God Save the Queen". Attendees stood until Lord Mayo took his seat on the throne. The rulers were then individually introduced to Lord Mayo by the Foreign Secretary, followed by nobles and local dignitaries introduced by the Under-Secretary. All attendees, except the Maharana of Udaipur, presented a nazrana upon introduction.

== Speech ==
Following the introductions, Lord Mayo delivered his speech, in which he laid emphasis on the duties and responsibilities of the rulers of Rajputana. He asked them to protect and respect the rights of their subjects, and proposed the founding of a school or college for the education of the rulers and nobles of Rajputana, and of their sons. In his speech, he said:

And now, let me mention a project which I have much at heart, I desire much to invite your assistance to enable me to establish at Ajmer a school or college which should be devoted exclusively to the education of the sons of the Chief, Princes, and leading Thakurs of Rajputana. It should be an institution suited to the position and rank of the boys for whose instruction it is intended, and such a system of teaching should be founded as would be best calculated to fit them for the important duties which in after life they would be called upon to discharge. It would not possible on this occasion to describe minutely the different features of such an institution, but I hope to communicate with you shortly on the subject and I trust you will favor and support an attempt to give to the youth of Rajputana instruction suitable to their high birth and position. Be assured that we ask you to do all this for no other object but your own benefit. If we wished you to remain weak, we should say, ‘Be poor, and ignorant and disorderly.’ It is because we wish you to be strong that we desire to see you rich, instructed, and well-governed.

— Richard Bourke, 6th Earl of Mayo, at the durbar

== Incident ==
During the proceedings preceding the durbar, Takht Singh was duly received with the privileges appropriate to his rank. At the durbar, Singh saw that his seat was placed below those of the rulers of Udaipur and Jaipur. Considering this arrangement inapporiate, he immediately left the durbar and the vicinity of Ajmer in anger. This displeased Lord Mayo, who reduced Singh's entitled gun salute by two and withdrew the privilege of the beating of drums in his honour while he remained under the jurisdiction of Ajmer. After the durbar, Singh is said to have visited the Shambhu Singh in order to dispel any misunderstanding arising from his conduct. During the meeting, he explained to Shambhu that his objection was not to sitting beside him, but felt it would be beneath their rank if officers occupied the seat between them. Singh left his two sons, Jaswant Singh II and Pratap Singh, in Ajmer, where they remained until the following day. They were summoned by Lord Mayo, who expressed appreciation for the manner in which Godwar had been administered by Jodhpur. Singh subsequently represented his case to the Secretary of State for India, who accepted his claim and restored his salute and privileges.

== Aftermath ==
At the conclusion of the durbar, the Lord Mayo, presented attar and paan to the Shambhu Singh. The Foreign Secretary presented the same to the other rulers present, while the Under Secretary distributed it to the nobles and gentlemen who attended the durbar. Lord Mayo then departed, and the rulers, in order of rank, were conducted to their elephants. Shambhu was conducted first, followed by the other rulers, by the Foreign and Under Secretaries and the Political Officers present. This durbar eventually led to the formation of Mayo College at Ajmer. Mayo College began its operation in 1875 with 23 students and, over the years, came to be regarded as one of the premier educational institutions of its kind in British India.

Lord Mayo left Ajmer on 25 October 1870.

== See also ==
- Delhi Durbar
