= Chuda State =

Former monarchy in India (1707-1947)

Coordinates: 22.4833°N 71.7333°E

- 1707–1947
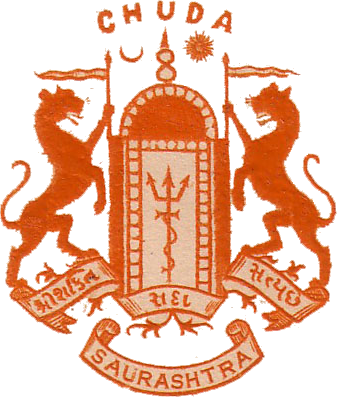
- Coat of arms
- Capital: Chuda
- History
  - Established: 1707
  - Accession to Indian Union: 1947

Area
  - Total: 202 km^{2} (78 sq mi)

Population
  - 1921 census: 11,333
Preceded by	Succeeded by
Wadhwan State	1943: Dhrangadhra State; 1947: India
- Today part of: Gujarat, India

Chuda State was one of the princely states of India in the Jhalawad region of Kathiawar during the period of the British Raj. It was an offshoot of Wadhwan State ruled by the Jhala clan of Rajputs. Chuda town was the capital of the State.

== History ==
During the British Raj, it was a third class state under the colonial Eastern Kathiawar Agency.

It ceased to exist on 15 February 1948 by accession to newly independent India's Saurashtra State. The privy purse was fixed at 51,250 Rupees. The Rajput line of nominal Thakurs in continued.

=== Thakur Shris ===
- 1707 - 1747 Abhasinhji Madhavsinhji (died 1747)
- 1747 - 1768 Raisinhji Abhasinhji, son of the above (d. 1768)
- 1768 - 1780 Gajsinhji Raisinhji, son of the above (d. 1780)
- 1780 - 1820 Hathisinhji Gajsinhji, son of the above (d. 1820)
- 1820 - 1830 Abhasinhji Hathisinhji, son of the above
- 1830 - 1854 Raisinhji Abhasinhji, son of the above
- 24 July 1854 – 13 Jan 1908 Bacharsinhji Raisinhji, son of the above (b. 1840 - d. 1908)
- 22 Feb 1908 – 20 Jan 1921 Jorawarsinhji Bacharsinhji, son of the firstborn son of the above (b. 1886 - d. 1921)
- 20 Jan 1921 - 1947 Bahadursinhji Jorawarsinhji, son of the above, ?last ruler (b. 1909 - d. ... )
- 20 Jan 1920 – 7 Feb 1929 ... -Regent
- Dharmendrasinhji Bahadursinhji, son of the above
- 4 Oct 1950 Krishnakumarsinhji Dharmendrasinhji, son of Bahadursinhji

== Demographics ==
The state had a population of 11,333 in 1921.

== Economy and transport ==
There is a railway station at Chuda on the Bhavnagar-Wadhwan line. The soil of Chuda is very fertile, and the water is considered good.
