= Sitaleshwar Temple =

Hindu temple in Jhalrapatan, Rajasthan, India

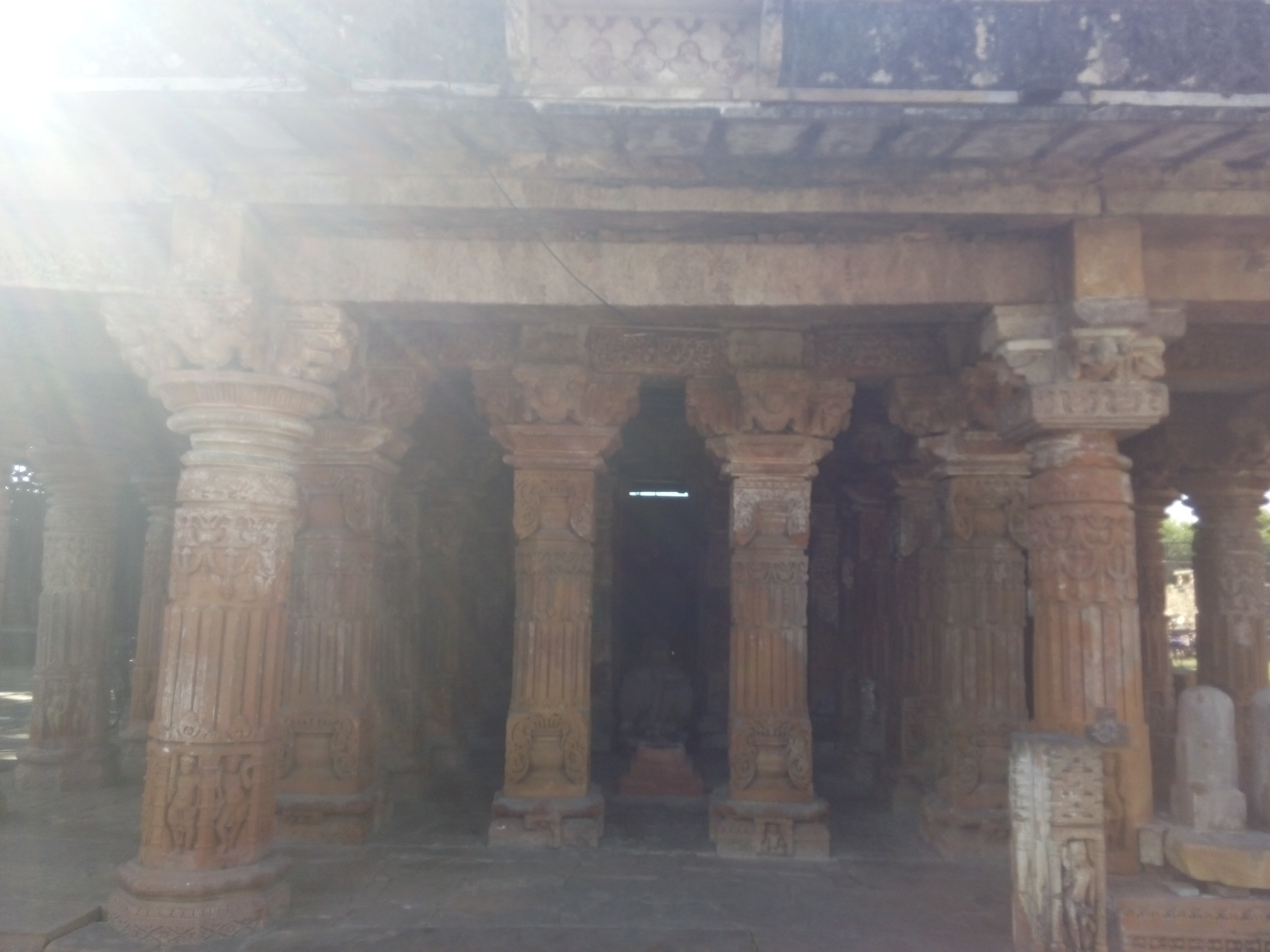
- The eastern entrance of the temple. The pillars of the mandapam are seen, as is the Nandi within

Religion
- Affiliation: Hinduism

Location
- Interactive map of Sitaleshwar Temple
- Coordinates: 24°31′46″N 76°10′40″E
- Monument of National Importance
- Official name: Old Temples near the Chandrabhaga
- Reference no.: N-RJ-71

Sitaleshwar Temple, or Sitaleshwar Mahadeva Temple, is a temple located in Jhalrapatan, Rajasthan. Dedicated to Shiva, the temple consists of a pavilion with elaborately carved pillars, an antechamber, and a sanctum. The exterior walls are carved with sculptures in relief depicting various Hindu deities.

It is a part of a complex of several temples, known as the Chandrabhaga group of temples, which is listed as a monument of national importance.

== Description ==
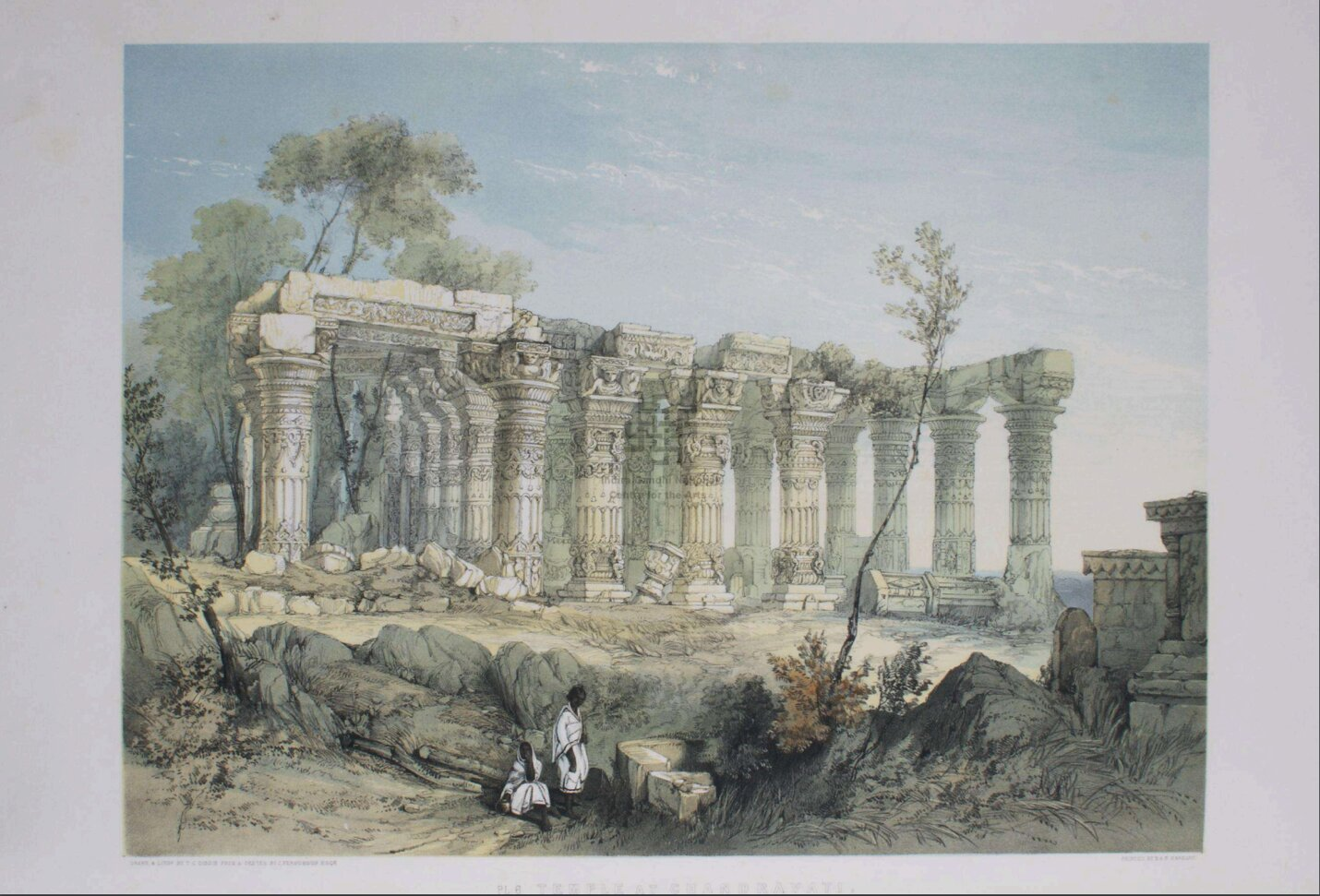
Sitaleshwar Temple, as published by Fergusson in 1848. Only the pillars of the mandapam survive. The temple was later reconstructed utilizing the ruins from the site

The temple was built in the 7th century, and the pillared hall was added in the 10th century. James Fergusson surveyed the temple in the late 19th century, and reported it to be in ruins, with only the columns of the pillared hall surviving. He describes these as "most elegant specimen of columnar architecture in India", further stating that despite its dilapidated state, it still remained a place of worship. Alexander Cunningham also surveyed the ruins of the temple. Later, the temple was reconstructed utilizing the ruins from the site.

The temple faces east. It consists of a mandapam (pillared hall), antarala (antechamber), and a square garbhagriha (sanctum). The shikhara (temple tower) originally surmounting the sanctum, has collapsed, and the temple currently has a flat roof with a small dome. The exterior walls of the temple are adorned with sculptures carved in relief of various gods of the Hindu pantheon. The main deity of the temple is Shiva, in the form of Sitaleshwar (Sitalisvara). The suffix "-isvara" is usually applied to indicate Shiva presiding over any aspect. The name thus roughly translates to "lord of Sitala".

The pillars of the mandapa are carved with female figures, asthadikpalas, and ascetics. The fourteen outer pillars have octagonal bases. The twelve inner pillars have square bases, and are topped with Purna-Kalasha pot-motifs. A Nandi facing a Shiva lingam is placed within the pillared hall. Four pillars stand at the entrance of the antechamber.

The antechamber leads to the sanctum, through an elaborately carved entrance with five bands. These bands contain floral motifs. The river goddesses Ganga and Yamuna are found at the base of the doorjambs. Lakulisa is depicted in the central niche of the lintel. The main deity in the sanctum is represented by a Shiva lingam. It used to be accompanied by an image of Shiva-Parvati, which is now lost.
