= Kolana Airport =

Airport of Rajasthan, India

- IATA: none; ICAO: none

Summary
- Airport type: Public
- Operator: Rajasthan Government
- Serves: Jhalawar
- Location: Kolana, India
- Elevation AMSL: 320 m / 1,050 ft
- Coordinates: 24°35′46.41″N 076°13′36.81″E

Map
- Location of airport in India Kolana Airport (India)

Runways
Direction	Length		Surface
Direction	m	ft	Surface
13/31	3,110	5,610	Asphalt

Kolana Airport is an airport serving Jhalawar in the state of Rajasthan, India. It is owned and operated by the State Government of Rajasthan. The airport is spread over 23.5 acres, has a 1710 metre long runway and a 2340 square metre apron for two small aircraft. The terminal building covers 466 Square metres.

The Rajasthan government plans to expand the airport to enable the operation of medium-sized aircraft at a cost of Rs 159 crore spread over two phases. The first phase, costing Rs. 125 Crores includes lengthening the runway to 2,350 metres while the second phase will include lengthening the runway to 3000 metres at a cost of 34 crores.
