= Kolvi Caves =

Buddhist caves in Rajasthan, India

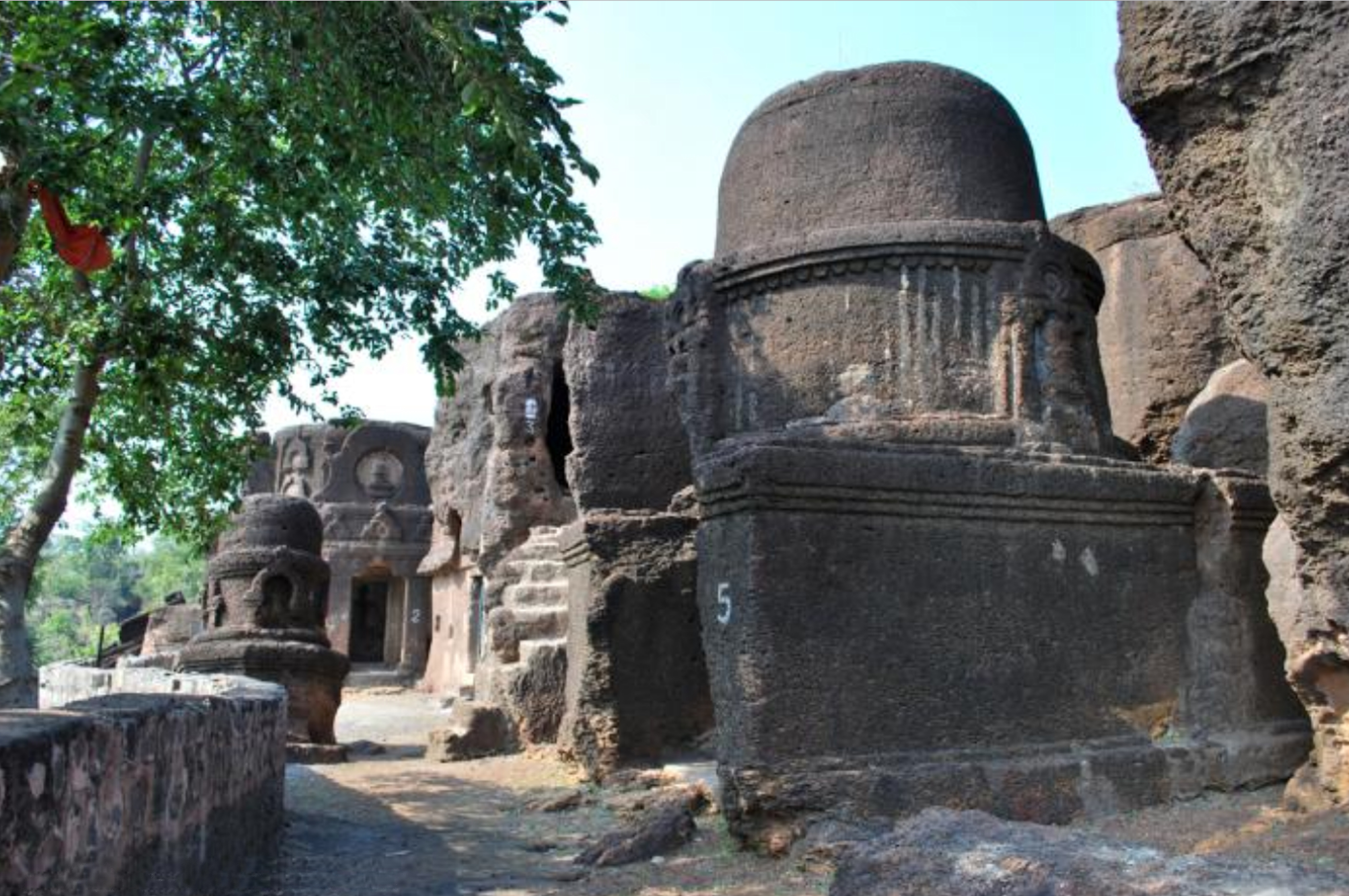
- Kolvi Caves

- Location within India
- 24.0118137°N 75.8480568°E
- Type: Buddhist Caves

Kolvi Caves, or Kholvi Caves, are located at Kolvi village of Jhalawar district in the state of Rajasthan, India. They are on a hill carved out of laterite rock. This Buddhist site has stupas and chaityas containing figures of the Buddha. One architectural style shows the dominance of a Mahyana sect in this region, circa 8th-9th century CE. Around 50 caves have been found here. The caves have statues of the Buddha in meditation and standing positions. The stupas and colossal statues of Buddha are archaeologically significant. Further around Kolvi, similar caves have been discovered which supports the regional existence of a prosperous Buddhist civilization. The Kolvi caves register the presence of Buddhism in Rajasthan; they are very similar to the Bagh Caves, thus revealing a cultural affinity with a region geographically close.

== History ==
The Kolvi Caves were first visited and reported on by Dr. Impey in 1854. Alexander Cunningham published his own report on the caves 8-10 years later. These caves belong to a relatively later period (see below), but the discovery of a rock-cut chaitya made Kolvi, at the time, a very striking and majestic site. According to Cunningham, "Another equally striking peculiarity about these topes is the possession of an excavated chamber for the reception of a statue. These chambers are invariably pierced to the centre of the tope, so that the enshrined statues of Buddha occupy the very same position in these modern chaityas, which the relics of Buddha filled in the ancient stupas of Asoka. They are, in fact, no longer stupas, but real temples, which differ only in their form from the common structural shrines of the Buddhists." On the basis of this innovation, the Kolvi caves have been assigned a date ranging from 700-900 CE, later than the Dhamnar Caves and Bagh Caves in Malwa.

== Architecture ==
While the caves display natural weathering and damage on the northern and eastern sides, their architecture remains historically and culturally important. The group has 50 caves, and many of the Buddha statues within have lost their figural faces due to natural decay. The caves are not currently occupied, but some caves have an open or pillared verandah. The ruins of 64 monk cells were originally reported, but presently the Archaeological Survey of India has verified only 45 similar constructs. A few elaborate multi-storey structures have been preserved. Some of the stupas and meditation halls contain a circumambulation or pradakshina path. Several Kolvi shrines have images of the Buddha. The largest image is a 12-foot standing Buddha in a preaching or dharmachakra mudra pose.

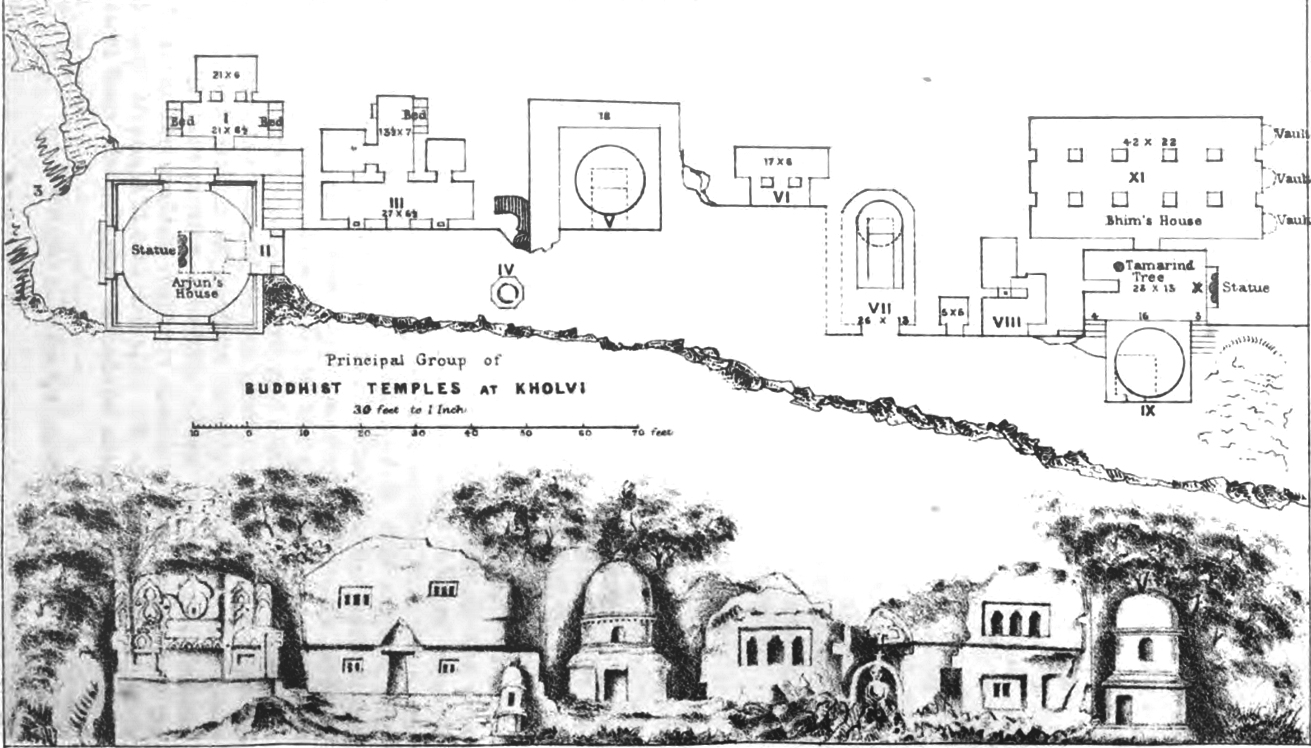
Kholvi Caves, plan and elevation

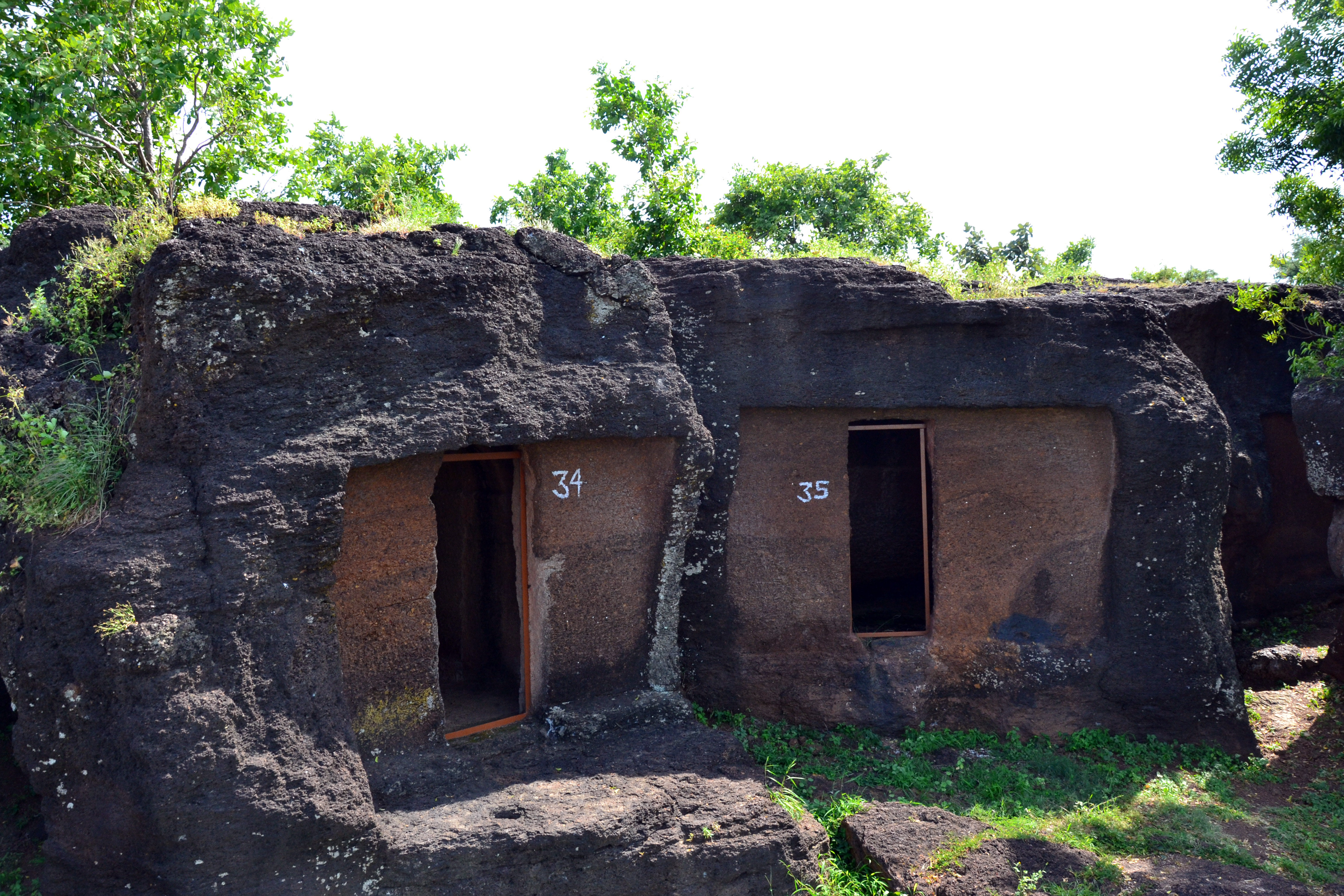
Kolvi Caves

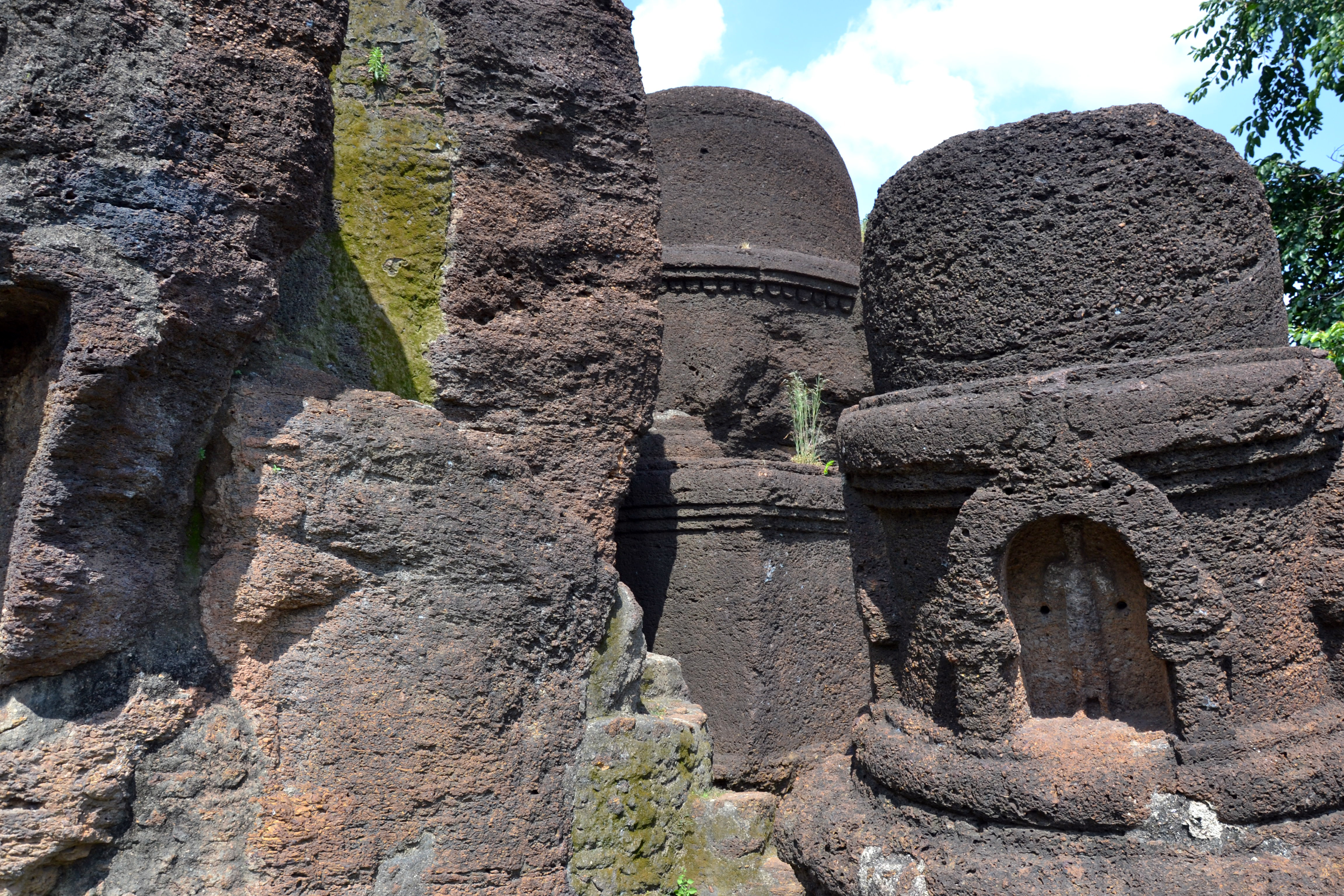
Kolvi Caves

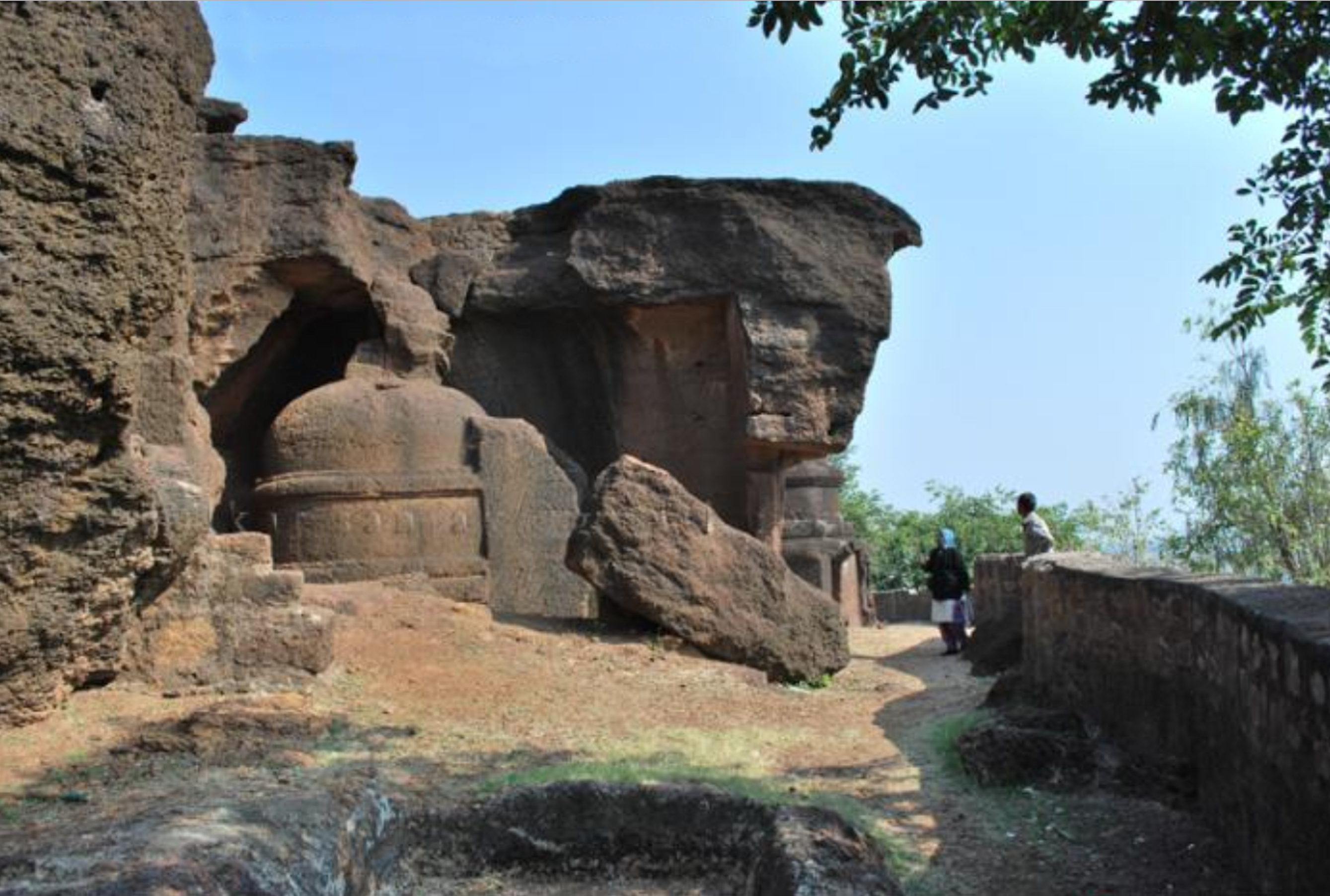
Kolvi Caves

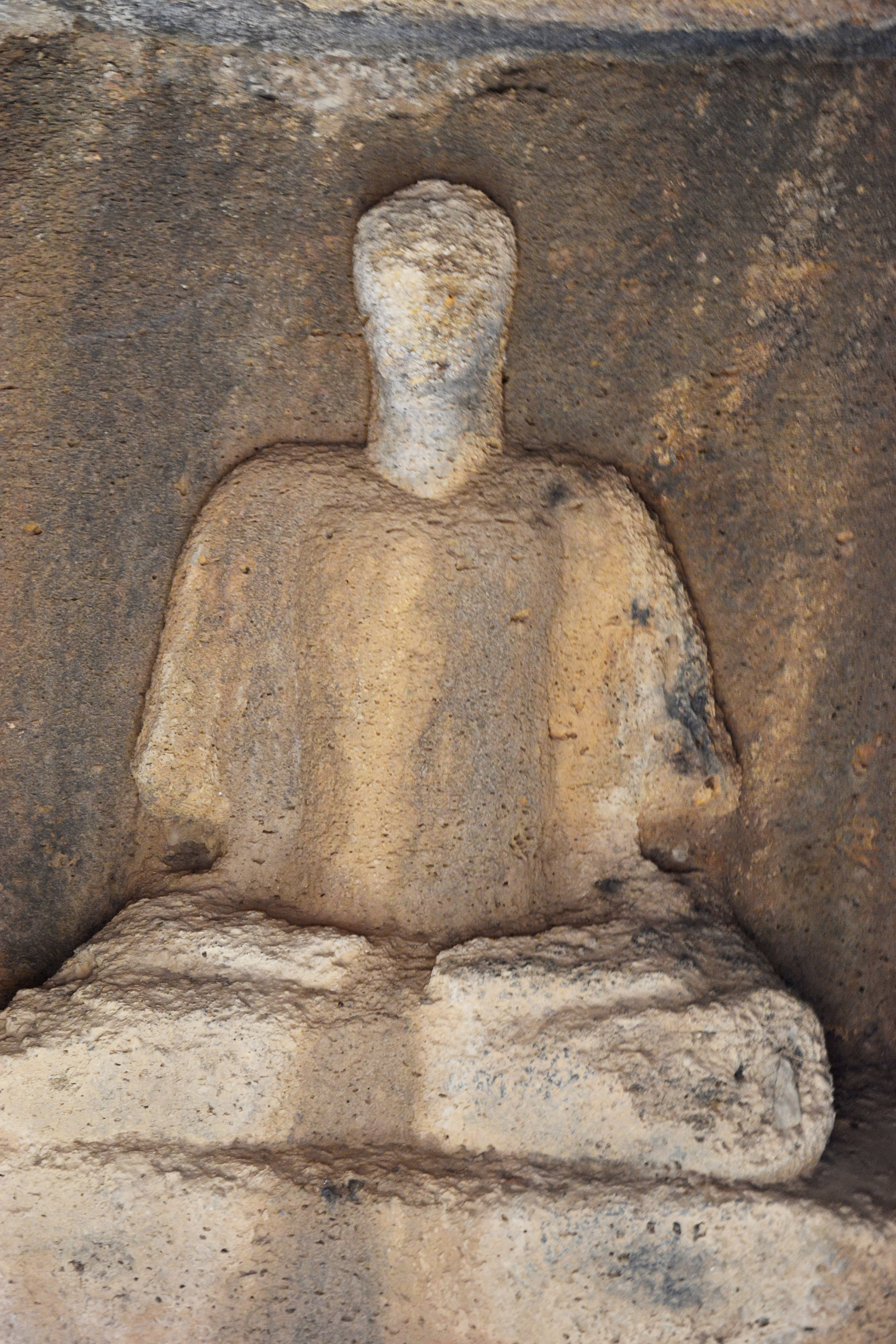
Buddha statue

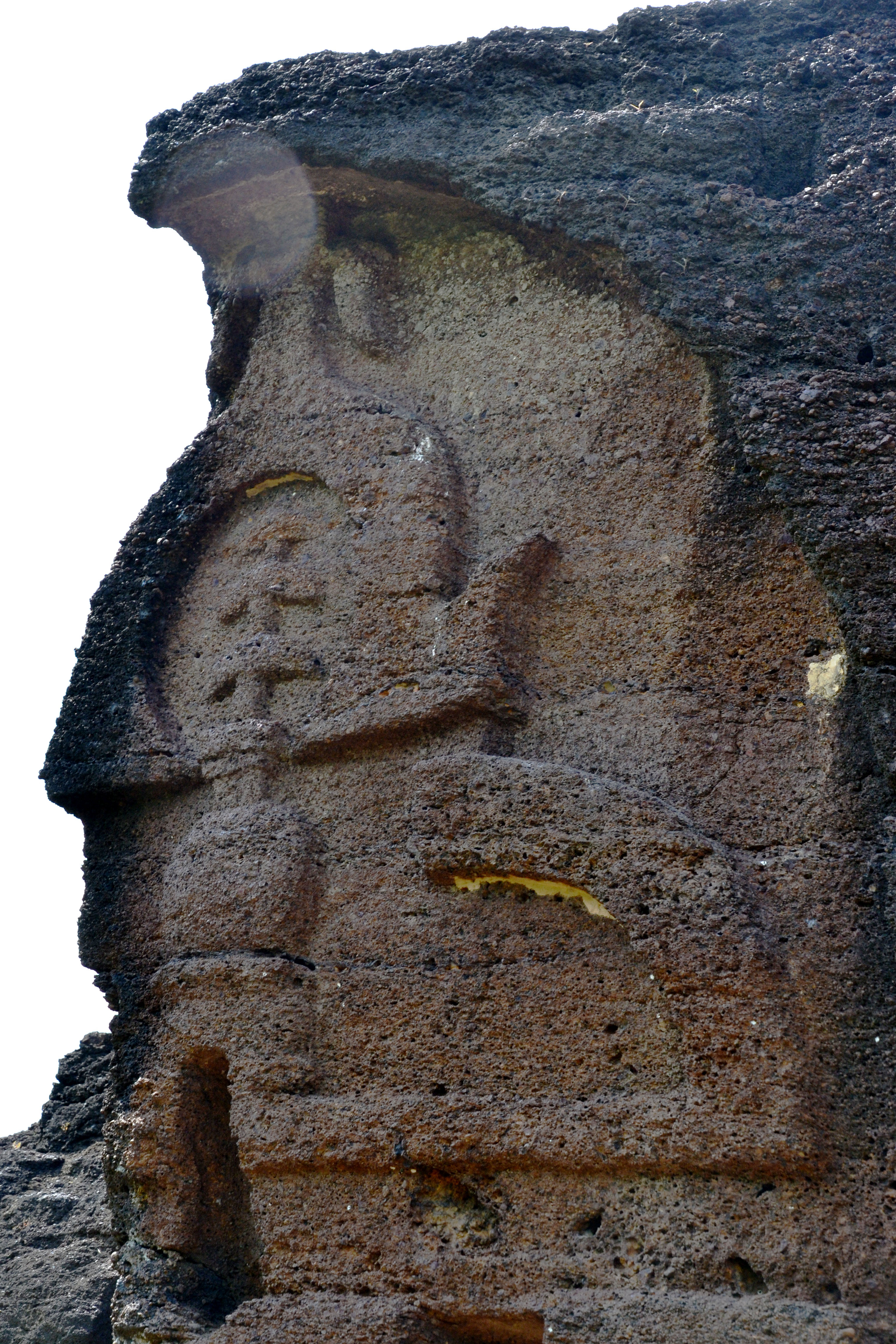
Rock-hewn chaitya arch

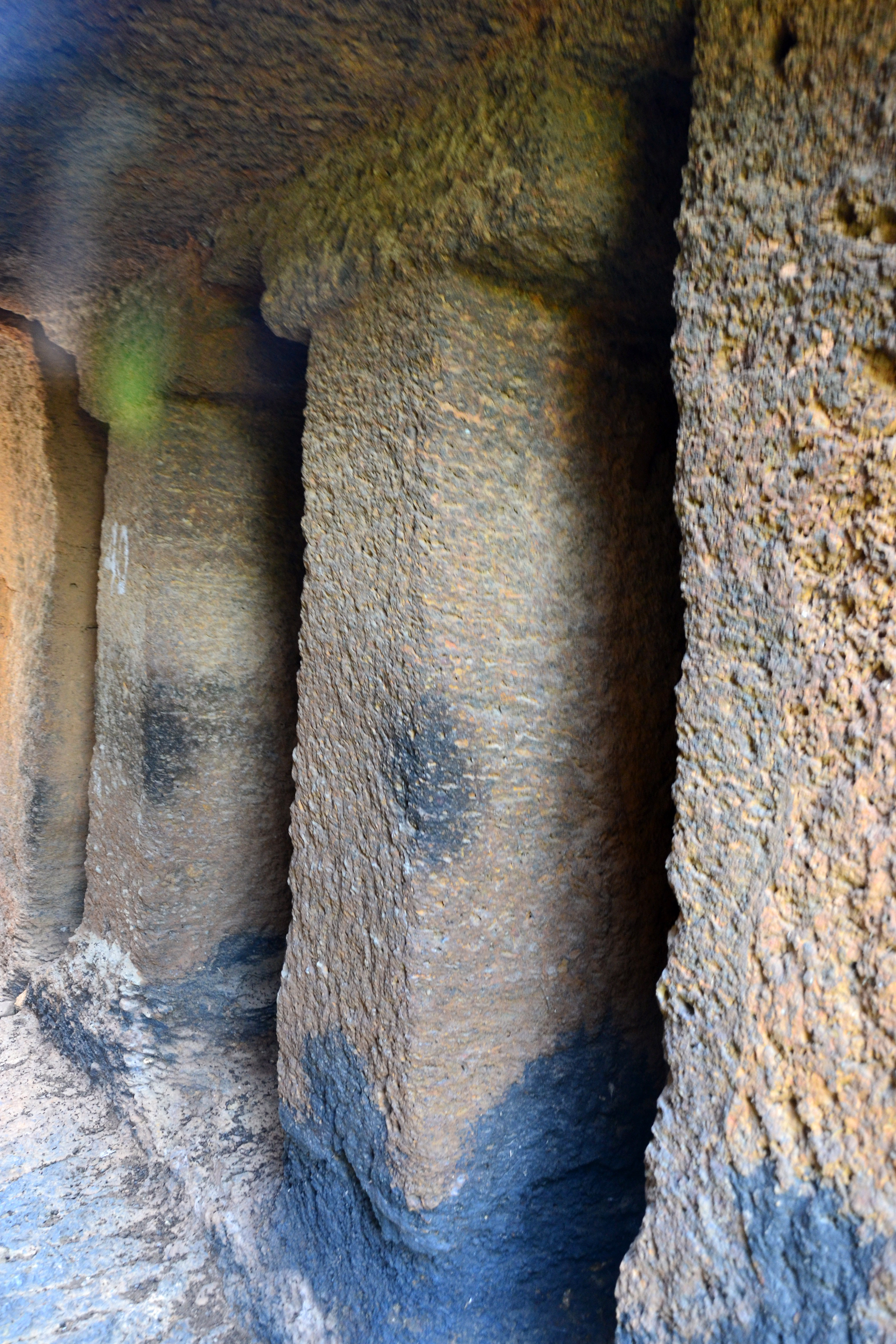
Pillars
