= Wadhwan State =

Former monarchy in India (1630–1948)

Coordinates: 22.42°N 71.41°E

- 1630–1948
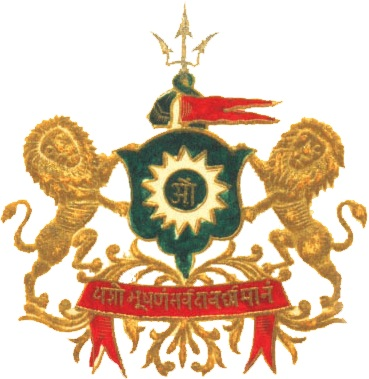
- Flag Coat of arms

- Location of Wadhwan State in Saurashtra
- Capital: Wadhwan
- History
  - Established: 1630
  - Accession to the Indian Union: 1948

Area
- 1931: 627 km^{2} (242 sq mi)
- 1943: 1,202 km^{2} (464 sq mi)

Population
  - 1931: 42,602
  - 1943: 69,245
Preceded by	Succeeded by
Kingdom of Jhalavad	Saurashtra (state)

Wadhwan State was an offshoot of Jhalavad, later became 9-guns Salute princely state during the British Raj. It ruled by the Jhala clan of Rajputs

The town of Wadhwan in the Saurashtra region of Gujarat was its capital. Its last ruler signed the accession to the Indian Union on 15 February 1948.

== History ==
Wadhwan State was established in 1630 by Thakore Saheb Rajoji, the grandson of Maharana Raj Saheb Chandra Singhji I of Jhalavad. Rajoji's grandson was Madhav Singh, the ancestor of Zalim Singh Jhala. Madhav Singh went to Hadoti, but his two sons, Arjan Singh and Abhey Singh, returned to Wadhwan. Arjan Singh then became the Thakore Saheb of Wadhwan, while Abhey Singh ruled over Chuda State. It became a British protectorate in 1807. The rulers of the state bore the title "Thakur Sahib".

== See also ==
- Western India States Agency
