= Jhalawar State =

Princely state in India

Coordinates: 24.59°N 76.16°E

- 1838–1949
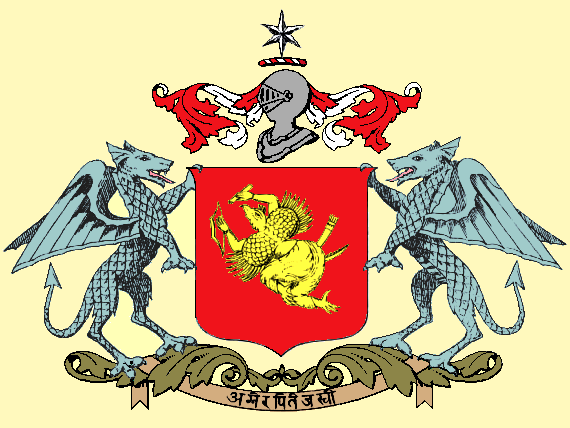
- Flag Coat of arms
- Motto: Agner api tejasvi "Even more blazing than fire"
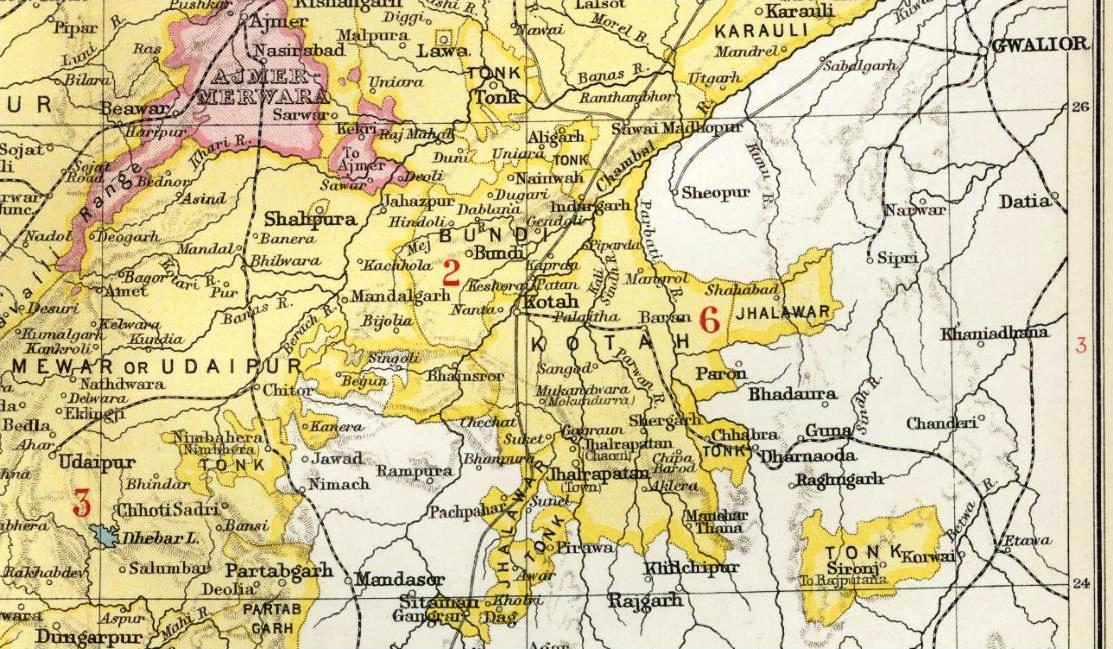
- Jhalawar State in The Imperial Gazetteer of India
- Demonym: Jhalawari
- Government: Monarchy
  - Dynasty: Jhala
- History
  - Established: 1838
  - Indian independence: 1949

Area
- 1881: 6,977.5 km^{2} (2,694.0 sq mi)
- 1901: 2,106 km^{2} (813 sq mi)

Population
  - 1881: 340,488
  - 1901: 90,175
| Succeeded by |
| India |
- Today part of: India · Rajasthan

Jhalawar State was a 15-gun salute (later 13) Princely State in India during the British Raj. It was located in the south eastern historic Hadoti region of Rajputana .The main town in the state was Jhalawar.

The state belonged to the Kotah-Jhalawar Agency which had headquarters at Kota and was a subdivision of the Rajputana Agency.

== History ==
In 1771, Maharao Guman Singh of Kota died, leaving an infant as his heir, and the regency was settled upon Zalim Singh his brother-in-law, and a descendant of Madho Singh Jhala whose ancestors came from Wadhawan in Gujarat. From that time, Zalim Singh became effectively the real ruler of Kota. He did not surrender power even when his young charge Maharao Umaid Singh I came of age, and continued to rule the state, effortlessly dominating the rao of Kota and reducing him to the status of a virtual non-entity. Unfortunate as this circumstance was, it is also true that Zalim Singh was an outstanding administrator and an astute negotiator. Under his administration, which lasted for over forty-five years, the state attained an acme of prosperity and was well-regarded by all its neighbours. It was also during these years that Kota entered into treaty relations with the British East India Company; Zalim Singh established excellent personal relations with the British. In the Holkar state, the revenues from areas that yielded 74 lakhs in 1750s yielded just 6 lakhs under Holkar Darbar nobles while three districts under Ijardari of Zalim Singh yielded 13 lakhs revenues that literally fed the Holkar royal family keeping it out of penury. Kotah state under previous rulers yielded less than 15 lakhs in revenues yielded 55 lakhs under Zalim Singh Kotah (Tod, Annals and Antiquities of Rajpootana).

The flip side of these achievements was that Zalim Singh himself attained a status of respectability exceeding that of his nominal overlord, the young Raja of Kota, and enjoyed leverage with the British that the Raja of Kota did not. It is due above all to this influence with the British that it was resolved in the year 1838, with the grudging consent of the chief of Kota, to dismember the state and create a new principality, which would be ruled by the descendants of Zalim Singh. Whereas, for many decades, the family of Zalim Singh had held large estates in fief of the state of Kota, and held important positions at court, they were now to be invested with royalty and become the rulers of their own state. The state of Jhalawar was created in this manner, and it received its name in honour of the fact that Zalim Singh belonged to the Jhala clan of Rajputs who were Chandravanshi or of the Lunar descent. The districts thus severed from Kota represented one-third (£120,000) of the income of Kota; by treaty, the new royal family acknowledged the suzerainty of the British and agreed to pay an annual tribute of £8000. Madan Singh, grandson of Zalim Singh was made the chief as his father Madho Singh had died in the lifetime of his grandfather and received the title of Maharaj Rana, and was placed on the same footing as the other chiefs in Rajputana.

Maharaj Rana Madan Singh, first ruler of independent Jhalawar, died in the year 1845. A scion from their parent line i.e. Wadhawan was adopted by Maharaj Rana Prithviraj Singh who took the name of Zalim Singh II in 1875 on becoming chief of Jhalawar. He was a minor and was not invested with governing powers until 1884. Owing to his maladministration, his relations with the British government became strained, and he was finally deposed in the year 1896, "on account of persistent misgovernment and proved unfitness for the powers of a ruling chief." He went to live at Varanasi, on a pension of £2,000 and the administration was placed in the hands of the British resident.

After much consideration, the British resolved in 1897 to break up the state, restoring the greater part to Kota, but forming the two districts of Shahabad and the Chaumahla into a new state of area 810 square miles (2,100 km^{2}), which came into existence in 1899, and of which Kunwar Bhawani Singh, a descendant of the original Zalim Singh I, was appointed chief. The population of the state was 90,175 in 1901, with an estimated revenue of £26,000 and a tribute of £2,000.

== Rulers ==
The rulers were entitled to a 13 gun salute by the British authorities, and were ruled by the Jhala clan of Rajputs.

| 8 Apr 1838 – 1845 | Maharaj Rana Madan Singh | (b. 1808 – d. 1845) |
| 1845 – 29 Aug 1875 | Maharaj Rana Prithviraj Singh | (b. 1830 – d. 1875) |
| 29 Aug 1875 – 2 Mar 1896 | Maharaj Rana Zalim Singh II | (b. 1865 – d. 1912) |
| 29 Aug 1875 – 21 Feb 1884 | Regent |
| 2 Mar 1896 – 1 Jan 1899 | interregnum |
| 1 Jan 1899 – 13 Apr 1929 | HH Maharaj Rana Sir Bhawani Singh | (b. 1874 – d. 1929) (from 26 Jun 1908, Sir Bhawani Singh) |
| 13 Apr 1929 – 2 Sep 1943 | HH Maharaj Rana Sir Rajendra Singh | (b. 1900 – d. 1943) (from 9 Jun 1938, Sir Rajendra Singh) |
| 2 Sep 1943 – 15 Aug 1947 | HH Maharaj Rana Sir Harish Chandra Singh | (b. 1921 – d. 1967) |

== See also ==
- Political integration of India
