= Zalim Singh =

Administrator, reformer and army commander of Kota state

- Raj Rana
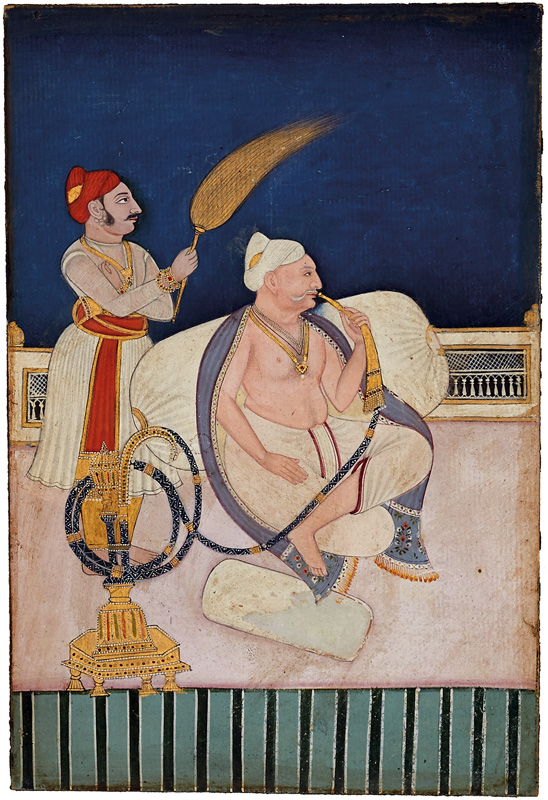
- Portrait of Zalim Singh

Musahib-i-Ala of Kota
- Reign: 1771 – 1824
- Successor: Madho Singh
- Born: 1739
- Died: 1824 (aged 84–85)
- Spouse: Gaurji (name unknown); Chundawatji (Sisodiniji) Indra Kanwarji of Begun in Mewar; Khichanji (Chauhanji) Saras Kanwarji from Raghogarh-Vijaypur; Sisodiniji Gulab Kanwarji of Shahpura; Sisodiniji Chandan Kanwarji
- Issue: Madho Singh; Ajab Kanwarji m.to Rao Bishan Singh of Bundi
Names
- Zalim Singh Jhala
- Dynasty: Jhala
- Father: Prithvi Singh (biological); Himmat Singh (adoptive)
- Mother: Sisodiniji Shaktawatji Kushal Kanwarji d.of Bhupal Singh of Dangarmow in Mewar

Zalim Singh Jhala (1739-1824) or Zalim Singh of Kotah, a Jhala Rajput was an administrator, reformer and army commander of the Hada Chauhan house of Kota. He was the de facto ruler of Kota State from 1771 to until his death in 1824. He was referred to by his contemporary James Tod as the Machiavelli of Rajasthan.

== Birth ==
He was born in 1739 to Prithvi Singh and later adopted by his paternal uncle, Himmat Singh.

== Early career ==
Upon Himmat Singh's death in 1758, he at the age of eighteen succeeded him in his jagir of Nanta and as Faujdar, or Commander, of the state troops of Kota State. Three years later, he was instrumental in leading the Kota troops to a decisive victory over the Jaipur army at Bhatwara, where seventeen elephants, 1,800 horses, 73 pieces of cannon, and a state flag of Jaipur fell into the hands of the Kota troops. Following the battle, Maharao Raja Shatru Sal of Kota welcomed him with great honor in an open durbar to celebrate the victory and acknowledged the valuable services he had rendered.

== Musahib-i-Ala of Kota ==
Sometime after Guman Singh became Maharao Raja of Kota, he appointed him as Musahib-i-Ala, or the Diwan, on 28 December 1764. He arranged the marriage of his adoptive sister to Guman Singh, which earned him the title of "Mama" (maternal uncle). He used this title in his daily life and official correspondence.

=== Leaving Kota ===
Later, the relationship between him and Guman Singh became tense due to their rivalry over a woman whom the Guman intended to bring into his zenana. He left Kota and went to Udaipur, where he was received by Raj Rana of Bari Sadri, who introduced him to the Maharana Ari Singh, who quickly took him into his service. Maharana granted him the jagir of Cheeta Khera and Kirpapur, the title of Raj Rana, and married him to the daughter of his cousin. When attempts were made to dethrone the Maharana, he garnered the support of the nobility of Mewar and the Rajadhiraj of Shahpura, and secured military aid from Peshwa officers in favor of the Maharana. He fought alongside Maharana and his troops in 1769 against Mahadaji Shinde on the banks of the Shipra, where they emerged victorious. However, the situation soon turned unfavorable due to the rash abandonment of the Rajputs. Mahadji used this to his advantage and defeated them. Zalim Singh's horse was killed on the battlefield, and he was seriously wounded and taken prisoner by the Marathas. He was held at Gugor Fort and released in 1769 due to the intervention of his old friend, Ambaji Ingle. Ambaji asked his wife, a rakhi sister of Mahadji Shinde, to request Zalim Singh's release on Raksha Bandhan after tying rakhi to Mahadji. When she made the request, Mahadji granted it.

=== Recalled to Kota ===
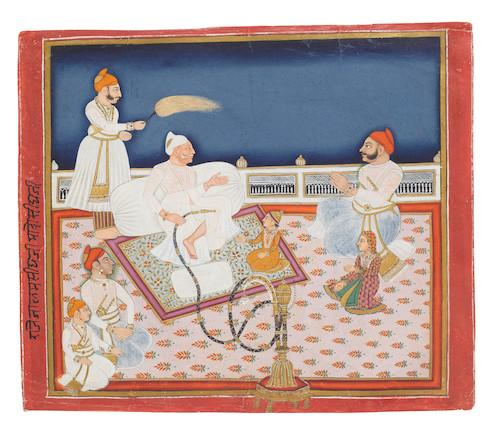
Zalim Singh Jhala receiving his son Madho Singh

In 1771, when Guman Singh was on his deathbed, he summoned Zalim Singh back to Kota. Upon his return, he reinstated him as the Faujdar and allocated a part of Garh Palace for his residence, where Zalim constructed Jhala ki Haveli. Guman Singh also entrusted his son Umed Singh and the state to Zalim's care.

=== De facto ruler of Kota ===
Upon Guman Singh's death in 1771, he became the de facto ruler of Kota. For more than fifty years, he played a significant role directly in Kota and indirectly in the neighboring states of Rajputana. He generously spent on the upkeep of Umed Singh and his immediate family, earning the durbar of Kota a reputation, as noted by Comte de Modave, as one of the most magnificent in all of Hindustan. His foreign policy, except for Udaipur, was highly successful, allowing him to elevate Kota to a position of great prosperity. He conducted a statewide land survey in Kota in 1792. In 1804, he first interacted with the British when the Kota troops assisted Colonel Manson during his disastrous retreat from Yashwantrao Holkar. He cooperated with John Malcolm in operations against the Pindaris. In 1805, he abandoned the Mughal system of revenue administration and introduced a new one in which patels, local village headmen, became directly responsible to him and a council of four senior patels. In 1807, he conducted a new survey to account for the lands brought under cultivation since the previous one. In 1817, he made a treaty with the British government, placing Kota under British protection. In 1818, a supplementary article was added to this treaty, which vested the entire administration of Kota in him and his heirs, in regular succession and perpetuity. In 1823, the British government, through his efforts, transferred the allegiance of eight sub-chiefships—Indargarh, Balwan, Khatoli, Gainta, Karwar, Pipalda, Phasud, and Antarda—from Bundi to the jurisdiction of Kota. He repaired and strengthened several small forts, which he believed would serve as strategic outposts for defense. He focused particularly on the forts of Shergarh, Gagron, Nahargarh, and Shahabad. The city wall of Kota, from Suraj Pol (Sun Gate) to Ladpura, was built by him. James Tod described it as being as strong as the Agra fort. He constructed nearly forty temples, both large and small, dedicated to deities from the Vaishnavism, Shaivism, and Shaktism traditions. He constructed tanks throughout almost all the parganas of Kota state to supply water to nearby communities, support irrigation for farmers, and generate revenue for the state. He built about ten bridges to facilitate travel and transport, the largest of which was at Borkhandi.

== Jhalrapatan ==
Jhalrapatan was founded in 1796 by him, approximately half a mile north of the ruins of Chandravati, which had been destroyed by Aurangzeb.

=== Dwarkadhish Temple ===
In 1796, he built the Dwarkadhish Temple in Jhalrapatan when he laid the foundation of the town, but the idol was installed nine years later.

== Personal life ==
=== Children ===
He had two sons: Madho Singh, from his wife, the daughter of a Ranawat chieftain, and Govardhan Das, from a Muslim concubine.

== Death ==
He died in 1824, and his son Madho Singh succeeded him as the Musahib-i-Ala of Kota.

== Sources ==
- Shastri, R. P. (1971). Jhala Zalim Singh (1730-1823), the De-facto Ruler of Kota: Who Also Dominated Bundi and Udaipur, Shrewd Politician, Administrator, and Reformer. Printed at Raj Printing Works.
- Bayley, C. S. (2004). Chiefs and leading families in Rajputana. New Delhi: Asian Educational Services. pp. 85–90. ISBN 81-206-1066-0. OCLC 60392358.
- Shastri, R. P. (1951). "Zalim Singh and the Marathas from 1761 to 1818". Proceedings of the Indian History Congress. 14: 322–326. ISSN 2249-1937. JSTOR 44303991.
