= Jhalrapatan =

City in Rajasthan, India

- City
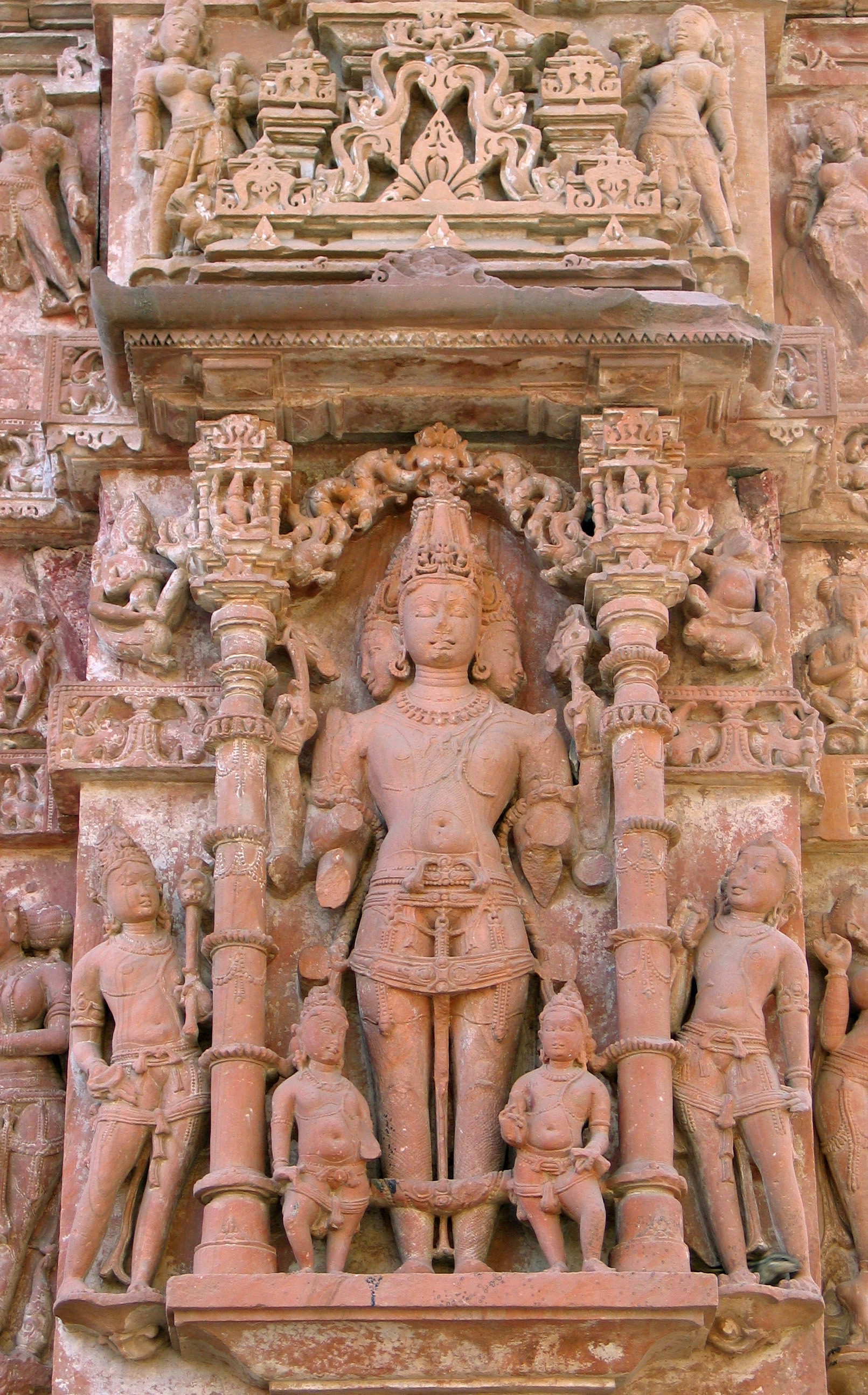
- Surya Statue, Jhalrapatan in Jhalawar district, Rajasthan, India
- Nickname: City of Bells
- Location in Rajasthan, India Jhalrapatan (India)
- Coordinates: 24.55°N 76.17°E
- Country: India
- State: Rajasthan
- District: Jhalawar
- Founder: Zalim Singh
- Named for: bells(jhalar) sound

Government
  - Type: Municipality
- Elevation: 317 m (1,040 ft)

Population (2011)
  - Total: 37,506

Languages
  - Official: Hindi, Rajasthani, Hadoti
  - Native: Hadoti dialect
- Time zone: UTC+5:30 (IST)
- PIN: 326023(common)

Jhalrapatan is a city and municipality of India in Jhalawar district in the state of Rajasthan. Its population is approximately 37,506.

A municipality was established at Jhalrapatan in 1892.

== History ==
Jhalrapatan was founded in 1796 by Zalim Singh, approximately half a mile north of the ruins of Chandravati, which had been destroyed by Aurangzeb.

== Education ==
Schools in Jhalrapatan include

•Government Engineering College, Jhalawar •Government Higher Secondary School •Government Girls Higher Secondary School •Vasudha Sr. Secondary School •Dr Radhakrishanan Sr Sec School •Gyan Ganga Public School

== Geography ==
Jhalrapatan is located at 24.55°N 76.17°E. It has an average elevation of 317 metres (1040 feet).

== Demographics ==
As of the 2001 India census, Jhalrapatan had a population of 30,103. Males constitute 52% of the population and females 48%. Jhalrapatan has an average literacy rate of 69%, higher than the national average of 59.5%: male literacy is 77%, and female literacy is 60%. 16% of the population is under 6 years of age.
