= Jhala (clan) =

Rajput clan from India

- Rajput clan
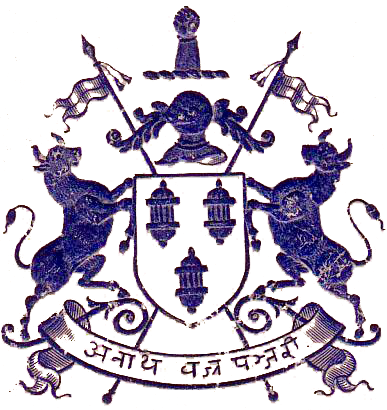
- Coat of the Jhala Rajputs
- Parent house: Makhwan dynasty of Sindh
- Country: Kingdom of Jhalavad; Jhalawar State; Wadhwan State; Wankaner State; Limbdi State; Lakhtar State; Chuda State; Labhowa Zamindari; Bari Sadri; Delwara; Gogunda
- Current region: Gujarat & Rajasthan
- Founded: 1093 AD
- Founder: Harpaldev
- Titles: Maharana, Maharaj-rana, Raja, Rajrana, Thakur

Jhala is a Rajput clan primarily found in the Indian states of Rajasthan and Gujarat.

== Origin ==
Jhala Rajputs Originate from Makawana Rajput dyansty of Karenti in Sindh., Citing Mandavik Charita, Ratanalāla Miśra states that the Jhala Rajputs are termed as Chandravanshi.

== History ==
The Jhalawar state ruled by Jhala Rajputs in Rajasthan was a 17-gun salute state, the princely state of Dhrangadhra was a 13-gun salute state in the 1920s, when it was ruled by members of the Jhala dynasty. At that time, Jhalas also governed in the 11-gun salute state of Wankaner and in the 9-gun salute states of Limbdi and Wadhwan, as well as in the non-salute states of Lakhtar, Sayla and Chuda.
