= Kamleshwar Mahadev Temple =

- Location of temple

Religion
- Affiliation: Hinduism
- District: Bundi
- Deity: Shiva
- Festivals: Pradosha, Maha Shivaratri
- Status: open

Location
- Location: Lakheri
- State: Rajasthan
- Country: India
- Coordinates: 25.76323°N 76.32721°E

Architecture
- Type: Hindu temple architecture
- Creator: Hammiradeva
- Established: 12th century

Kamleshwar Mahadev Temple is a Hindu place of worship situated in Lakheri, Rajasthan. Dedicated to the deity Shiva, it is sometimes called a "mini-Khajuraho" and a center of religious faith in the Hadoti region.

On every Pradosha before Amavasya, more than 100,000 pilgrims come to the temple to bathe in the holy pond and participate in the darshan of Shiva. A large number of visitors come from Madhya Pradesh.

== Geography ==
This temple is situated in a picturesque environment of nature near the Chakan River. Dense forest is still present at this place. It is located close to Bijasan Mata Temple and Indragarh Fort.

== Legend ==
Tradition holds that Ravana attempted to establish the Atmalinga in Lanka on behalf of Shiva in order to avoid death. Concerned, Vishnu intervened by assuming the guise of an old man. He put Ravana to sleep, seized the idol from his hands, and placed it on the ground. When Ravana woke up, he found he was unable to pick up the Lingam after it had touched the Earth, foiling his plan. The object is said to still stand there to this day.

The king Hammiradeva is said to have built the temple after receiving a vision of Mahadeva in his dream.

== History ==
The temple is believed to have been constructed during the 12th century. Remains of ancient settlements exist around the temple. Coins of King Hammiradeva period have been found here. Earthenware and stone tools have also been found there. Due to this, the antiquity of this place leads to the ancient human period. Remains of ancient importance also prove the immediate presence of early humans here. There is a living stone workshop on the hill to the right of the temple. There are incomplete statues and complete signs of carving on large boulders. Evidence of the presence of iron ore in this area also suggests that it might have been used in carving stones.

== Architecture ==
The temple's architecture reflects the distinct Hindu temple architecture style prevalent during that period. The three types of artistic sculptures of the temple are examples of great architecture. The art depicting the philosophy of life has been carved on the stones with detail, characterized by carved stone walls, pillars, and sculptures depicting mythological motifs. The temple complex comprises a sanctum (garbhagriha) housing the lingam (phallic symbol) of Lord Shiva, surrounded by a pillared hall (mandapa) and an open courtyard. The outer walls of the temple feature carvings depicting various deities.

== Festivals and celebrations ==
The temple is a hub of religious festivities and cultural celebrations throughout the year. The most significant festival observed at the temple is Maha Shivaratri, celebrated with great fervor and devotion by devotees who offer prayers, perform rituals, and participate in religious processions. Apart from Maha Shivaratri, other festivals such as Shravan Maas (the holy month of Shravan) and Pradosha before Amavsya of the Hindu Calendar are also celebrated with enthusiasm, attracting devotees from far and wide to seek the blessings of Lord Shiva.

== Preservation and conservation ==
Efforts are underway to preserve and conserve the temple and its surrounding heritage structures. It is worth noting that considering the architectural art in this mythological temple of the 12th century, the Archaeological Survey of India has declared it protected.

== See also ==
- Bundi
- Taragarh Fort, Bundi
- Bijasan Mata Temple
