= Bhimlat Mahadev Temple =

- Location in Rajasthan

Religion
- Affiliation: Hinduism
- District: Bundi
- Deity: Shiva
- Festival: Maha Shivratri

Location
- State: Rajasthan
- Country: India
- Interactive map of Bhimlat Mahadev Temple
- Coordinates: 25.30°N 75.41°E

Bhimlat Mahadev Temple is a Hindu temple of Shiva which is located at a distance of about 35 kilometers from Bundi district headquarters in Rajasthan, India. The temple is situated in the Aravalli mountain range near a large waterfall named Bhimlat Waterfall. This is a famous temple as well as a tourist destination in the Hadoti region of Rajasthan and devotees come in large numbers to it from south eastern districts of Rajasthan.

== Legend ==
It is said about this temple that during the Mahabharata period, Pandavas came here during their exile of 12 years. During this time, to arrange drinking water, Bhima hit the ground by his feet and a stream of water gushed out there. This water stream is still flowing even today. For this reason, this place is called Bhimlat.

== Temple ==
This temple is situated slightly below the ground and can be reached by stairs. The specialty of this temple is the continuous abhisheka of Shiva here with a stream of water.

== Waterfall ==
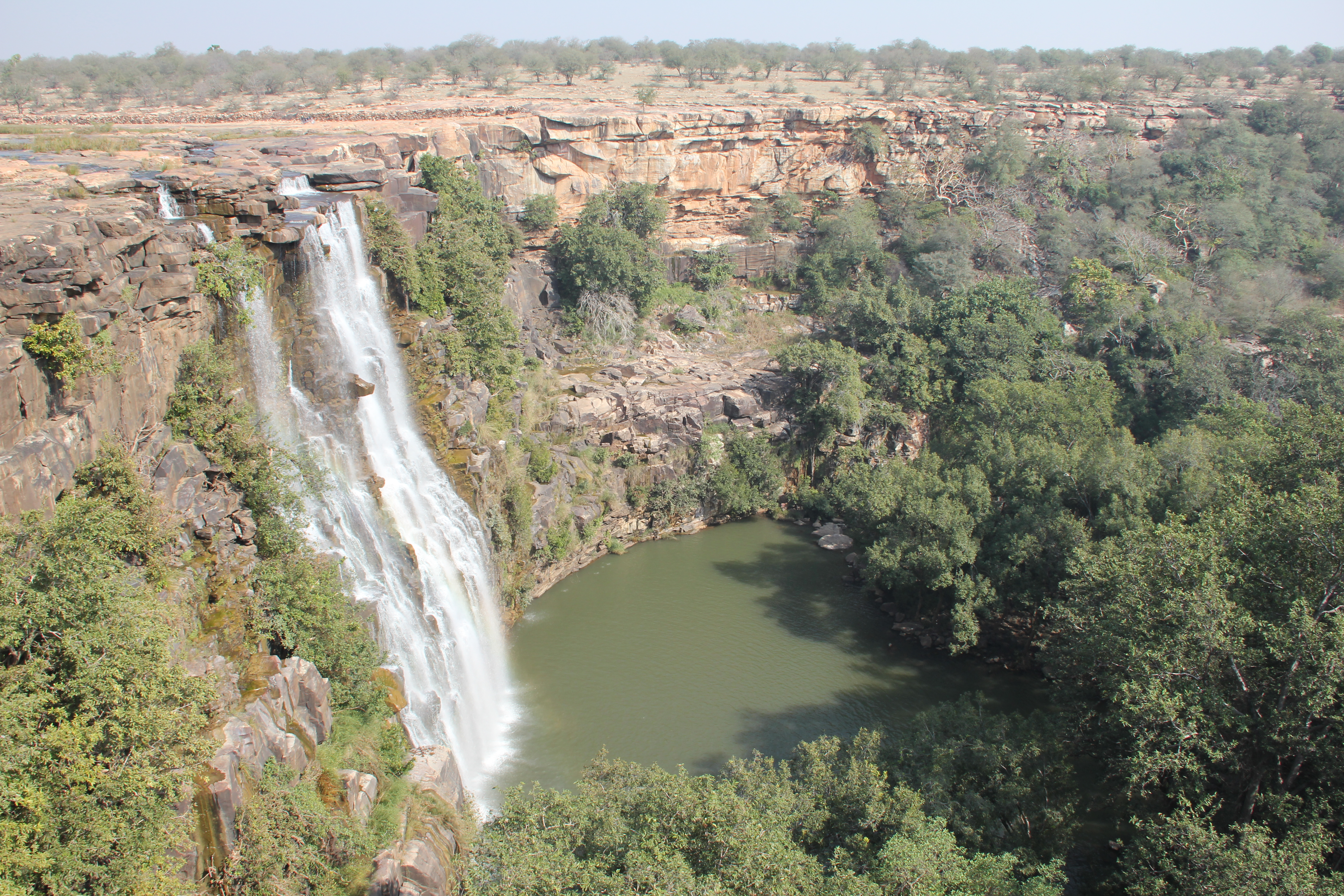
View of Bhimlat waterfall

There is a natural waterfall near the temple. The height of this beautiful natural waterfall is about 150 feet and the vastness of the area is 6 km. The beautiful sight of the waterfall is its water, which falls from a height into a pool and moves forward. Bhimalat Waterfall become more attractive during the rainy season and attracts a lot of tourists. This Waterfall is one of the tourist places of Rajasthan. Bhimlat Mahadev Temple and Waterfall have also been picked for ecotourism.

== See also ==
- Shiva
- Bundi
- Chauth Mata Temple, Bundi
- Bijasan Mata Temple, Indragarh
- Kamleshwar Mahadev Temple
