= Pandit Nayanuram Sharma =

Indian freedom fighter (?-1941)

- पंडित नयनुराम शर्मा
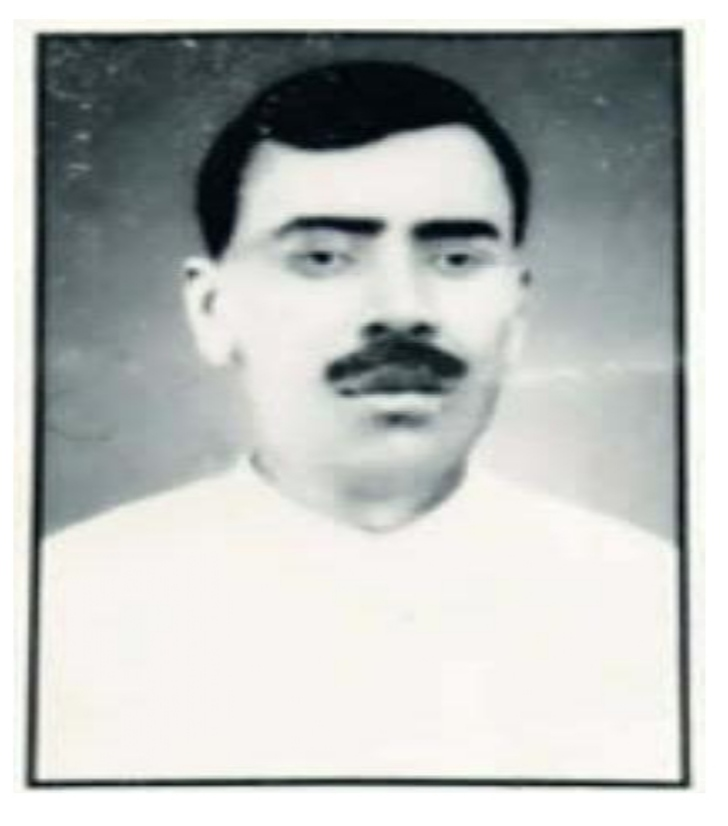
- Born: Ramganj Mandi
- Died: 14 October 1941
- Cause of death: Murder
- Monuments: JK Lon Hospital, Kota
- Other names: Nainuram Sharma
- Occupations: Police officer, activism
- Organization(s): Rajasthan Seva Sangh, Hadoti Praja Mandal
- Movement: Bundi Peasant Movement
- Website: Ramganj Mandi, Kota, Rajasthan

Pandit Nayanuram Sharma also known as Nainuram Sharma was an Indian freedom fighter from Kota, Rajasthan. He played a significant role in the Indian independence movement, contributing to various revolutionary activities and inspiring many in the region.

== Early life and education ==
Sharma was born in the village of Nimana in Ramganj Mandi tehsil of Kota district, Rajasthan. Raised in a traditional Brahmin family, he was deeply influenced by the cultural and historical significance of his homeland, which fueled his patriotic fervor and commitment to India's freedom struggle.

== Contribution to the Independence Movement ==
For several years he had served as Police officer in Kota State. But his patriotism could not keep him on that position. One day suddenly he renounced the government service and decided to take participate in Indian freedom struggle.

=== Joining Rajasthan Seva Sangh ===
As soon as Sharma was relieved from government service, he dedicated himself to the Rajasthan Seva Sangh founded by Vijay Singh Pathik. That time there were only three members in the Sangh as Vijaysingh Pathik, Ramnarayan Chaudhary, and Haribhai Kikar, after these three, Sharma became the fourth member of Rajasthan Seva Sangh.

=== Bundi Peasants Movement ===
After leaving his government job and joining the Rajasthan Seva Sangh, he first took up the work of prevention of forced labor (begar) in Kota state. He led the Bundi Peasant Movement also known as Barad Peasant Movement which was started in 1922. Within a short time, he toured all the areas of Hadoti region and created such an anti-begar environment that the then Kota and British officials had to accept the demands of Sharma. Although forced labor probably could not be completely eliminated, it was eliminated to a greater extent due to his efforts.

=== Establishment of Hadoti Praja Mandal ===
In the year 1934, he established Hadoti Praja Mandal with freedom fighter Abhinn Hari, in Hadoti region to serve people of this region.

=== Association with Mahatma Gandhi ===
Sharma had the honor of hosting Mahatma Gandhi at Ramganj Mandi during his national tour of India. Gandhi's visit and the hospitality extended by Sharma were important events, the place of their meeting is now known as Gandhi Chowk in Ramganj Mandi.

=== Journalism ===
As long as he lived, Sharma criticized the state government and officials in various newspapers through his articles.

== Martyrdom ==
Sharma's life was tragically cut short on 14 October 1941. While returning from a meeting in Khairabad, he was brutally murdered by an unknown gang of Britishers. The murderers were caught but the then government released them saying that there was no evidence. After his assassination, attribute meeting was organized by many freedom fighters of Rajasthan in 1942. In which leaders Vijay Singh Pathik, Manikya Lal Verma were present. His death was a significant blow to the local independence movement, but it also inspired further resistance against colonial rule.

== Legacy and Memorials ==
=== Recognition and Challenges ===
Despite his sacrifices, Sharma did not receive the widespread recognition he deserved. His contributions are often ignored, and there are no significant monuments or institutions named after him in his hometown. His family and local supporters continue to advocate for his recognition at both the local and national levels.

=== Commemorations ===
==== Martyr’s Memorial ====
A modest memorial exists at the crossing near JK Lon Hospital in Kota, but it is in a state of neglect. A park in Kota district at Nayapura circle named in his memory.

==== Annual Tributes ====
His family and local community members gather annually on his death anniversary to pay tribute at the site of his martyrdom.

==== Calls for Memorials ====
There have been ongoing efforts to establish a proper memorial and name local institutions after Sharma, but these have faced bureaucratic and political hurdles.

== See also ==
- Ram Kalyan Sharma
- Nanak Bheel
