= Chauth Mata Temple, Bundi =

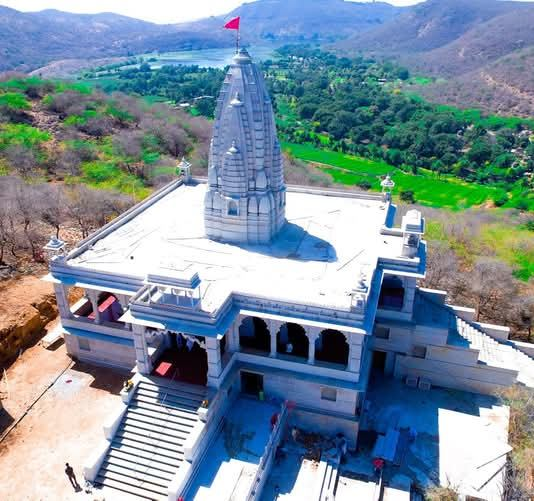
- Drone view of Chauth Mata Temple, Bundi

- Location in Rajasthan

Religion
- Affiliation: Hinduism
- District: Bundi
- Deity: Chauth Mata
- Festivals: Karwa Chauth, Til Chauth

Location
- State: Rajasthan
- Country: India
- Interactive map of Chauth Mata Temple, Bundi
- Coordinates: 25.4664°N 75.6592°E

Chauth Mata Temple is a Hindu temple located at a distance of about 5 kilometers from Bundi district headquarters in Rajasthan, India. The temple is dedicated to Chauth Mata, a manifestation of the Hindu Goddess Parvati.

== Geography ==
This temple is situated on a hill in the Aravalli mountain range named Banganga Hill. A river flows through the temple's foothills, which is known as the Banganga River.

== History ==
It is said that the Hada Chauhan king of Bundi used to visit the Chauth Mata Temple situated in village of Chauth Ka Barwara of Sawai Madhopur, but when the king became old and did not have the courage to reach the temple, then at that time the king brought the replica of Chauth Mata of Chauth Ka Barwara to Bundi and established the temple of Chauth Mata on the Banganga hill in Bundi. Since then, Chauth Mata has been worshiped here, and the faith in the Mata remains intact.

Chauth Mata is worshiped as the Kul Devi in the royal family of Bundi.

== Architecture ==
This temple is built in the Hindu temple architectural style. There are two main gates in this temple. To visit the temple, devotees can either climb the stairs or directly by road up the hill.

== Events ==
Every year, a fair is organized here for both the festivals of Karva Chauth and Til Chauth, where a large number of devotees come to have darshan of Chuath Mata.

== See also ==
- Bhimlat Mahadev Temple
- Viratra Vankal Mata Temple
- Taragarh Fort, Bundi
- Ram Kalyan Sharma
- Malan Masi Balaji Temple
