= Bijasan Mata Temple =

Bijasan Mata Temple may refer to:

- Bijasan Mata Temple, Indore
- Bijasan Mata Temple, Indragarh
- Bijasan Mata Temple, Salkanpur
