= Katawar, Rajasthan =

Katawar
- Village
- Location within Rajasthan Location within India
- Coordinates: 24.786768°N 76.541489°E
- Country: India
- State: Rajasthan
- District: Baran (Hadoti Region)

Government
  - Type: Democratic
  - Body: Gram Panchayat
  - Sarpanch: Rajendra Prasad Vaishnav
  - Member of Parliament Jhalawar-Baran (Lok Sabha constituency): Dushyant Singh (BJP)
  - Member of Legislative Assembly Atru-Baran Legislative constituency: Radheshyam Bairwa (BJP)

Area
  - Total: 6.8 km^{2} (2.6 sq mi)
- Elevation: 289 m (948 ft)

Population (2011)
  - Total: 2,049
  - Density: 300/km^{2} (780/sq mi)
- Demonym: Rajasthani

Languages
  - Official: Hindi, English
  - Native: Hadoti
- Time zone: UTC+5:30 (IST)
- PIN: 325223
- Telephone code: 07451
- Sex ratio: 901♀/♂
- Sex ratio: 1008 ♀/♂

Katawar is a village in the Hadoti region of Rajasthan, India. It serves as a Gram panchayat for six nearby villages which are Manyagan, Achrawa, Bhojukheri, Mehla, and Baldevpura. Bichhalas. The nearest town is Atru, which is 22 km away. It is located 52 km from the district headquarter, Baran.

== Social structure ==
As per available data from the year 2009, 2049 persons live in 367 house holds in the village Katawar. There are 971 female individuals and 1078 male individuals in the village. Females constitute 47.39% and males constitute 52.61% of the total population.

There are 822 scheduled castes persons of which 388 are females and 434 are males. Females constitute 47.2% and males constitute 52.8% of the scheduled castes population. Scheduled castes constitute 40.12% of the total population.

There are 71 scheduled tribes persons of which 34 are females and 37 are males. Females constitute 47.89% and males constitute 52.11% of the scheduled tribes population. Scheduled tribes constitute 3.47% of the total population.

The population density of Katawar is 236.33 persons per square kilometer.

== Population ==
Katawar population in 2021/2022 is between 2,008 and 2,295 and the total households residing are 367.
