= State Highway 125 (Rajasthan) =

Road in Rajasthan, India

Route information
- Maintained by Public Works Department, Rajasthan
- Length: 49.50 km (30.76 mi)

Major junctions
- From: SH 29 in Bhairupura ojha
- To: SH 37A at Roteda

Location
- Country: India
- State: Rajasthan

Highway system
- Roads in India; Expressways; National; State; Asian; State Highways in Rajasthan
← SH 124	→ SH 126

State Highway 125 (RJ SH 125, SH-125) is a State Highway in Rajasthan state of India that connects Bhairupura ojha in Bundi district of Rajasthan with Roteda in Bundi district of Rajasthan. The total length of RJ SH 125 is 48.50 km.

This highway connects SH-29 in Bhairupura ojha to SH-37A in Roteda.
