= Indragarh =

Indergarh
- city
- Location in Rajasthan, India Indergarh (India)
- Coordinates: 25.729712°N 76.190914°E
- Country: India
- State: Rajasthan
- District: Bundi

Government
  - Type: Nagar Palika
  - Body: Nagar Palika Indergarh

Population (2001)
  - Total: 5,265

Languages
  - Official: Hindi
  - Native: Hadoti
- Time zone: UTC+5:30 (IST)
- ISO 3166 code: RJ-08

Indergarh is a city and a municipality in Bundi district in the Indian state of Rajasthan.

== Demographics ==
As of 2001 India census, Indragarh had a population of 5265. Males constitute 51% of the population and females 49%. Indragarh has an average literacy rate of 63%, higher than the national average of 59.5%: male literacy is 72%, and female literacy is 53%. In Indragarh, 17% of the population is under 6 years of age.
