= Nanak Bheel =

Indian freedom fighter (1890–1922)

Shaheed Nanak Bheel
- नानक भील
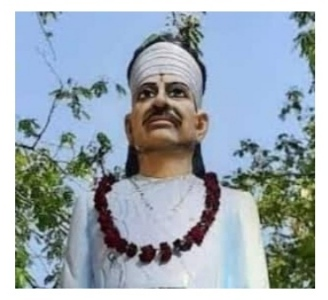
- Statue of Nanak Bheel
- Born: 1890; Bundi State, Rajasthan
- Died: 13 June 1922; Bundi State, Rajasthan
- Cause of death: Murder
- Monuments: Shaheed Nanak Bheel Smarak, Bundi
- Movement: Non-cooperation movement

Nanak Bheel (1890 — 1922) was an Indian freedom fighter from the Bundi district in the Indian state of Rajasthan. He played a pivotal role in Indian Independence movement in Bundi during British colonial rule in India and lost his life for the cause.

== Early life and revolutionary beginnings ==
He was born in the village of Dhaneshwar in Bundi district (previously known as Bundi State) in the state of Rajasthan, India, though specific details about his date of birth and family background are scarce. He belonged to the Bheel community, an indigenous ethnic group primarily found in Rajasthan and Gujarat. Inspired by the fervour of the independence movement led by figures such as Govind Guru, and Vijay Singh Pathik, he became actively involved in revolutionary activities at a young age.

== Role in the freedom struggle ==
He emerged as a prominent figure in the Indian independence movement, actively participating in various protests and movements against British colonial rule. In the Bundi district, he organised and led protests, demonstrating leadership and dedication to the cause of freedom. He fearlessly confronted the injustices perpetrated by colonial authorities and local landlords.

== Murder ==
On 13 June 1922, Nanak Bhil, was addressing a public meeting organised in the village of Dabi in Bundi district for the purpose of freedom from slavery and ending the princely and British colonial atrocities, grazing tax, exploitation and oppression. The British officers opened fire on this public meeting. The shots created panic but Nanak Bheel continued his address and was hit by three bullets to his chest.

== Legacy ==
In memory of the life of Nanak Bhil, a tribal development fair is organised by the district administration in Dabi in his memory. A memorial has been built for him in this village where his statue has been installed. He is remembered at this place every year on the anniversary of his deaths, with a large number of people attending commemorative events.

== See also ==
- Vijay Singh Pathik
- Ram Kalyan Sharma
