= Gurla Junction railway station =

Railway station in Rajasthan, India

Gurla Junction

General information
- Location: Gurla, Bundi district, Rajasthan; India
- Coordinates: 25.271196°N 75.886310°E
- Elevation: 250 metres (820 ft)
- System: Indian Railways station
- Owner: Indian Railways
- Operator: West Central Railway
- Line: New Delhi–Mumbai main line
- Platforms: 3
- Tracks: 3

Construction
- Structure type: Standard (on ground station)
- Parking: Yes

Other information
- Status: Functioning
- Station code: GQL
- Zone(s): West Central Railway
- Division(s): Kota
Location
- Location within India Location within Rajasthan

Gurla Junction railway station is a railway station in Bundi district, Rajasthan. Its code is GQL. It serves Gurla. The station consists of 3 platforms. Passenger and Express trains halt here.
