= Bardha Dam =

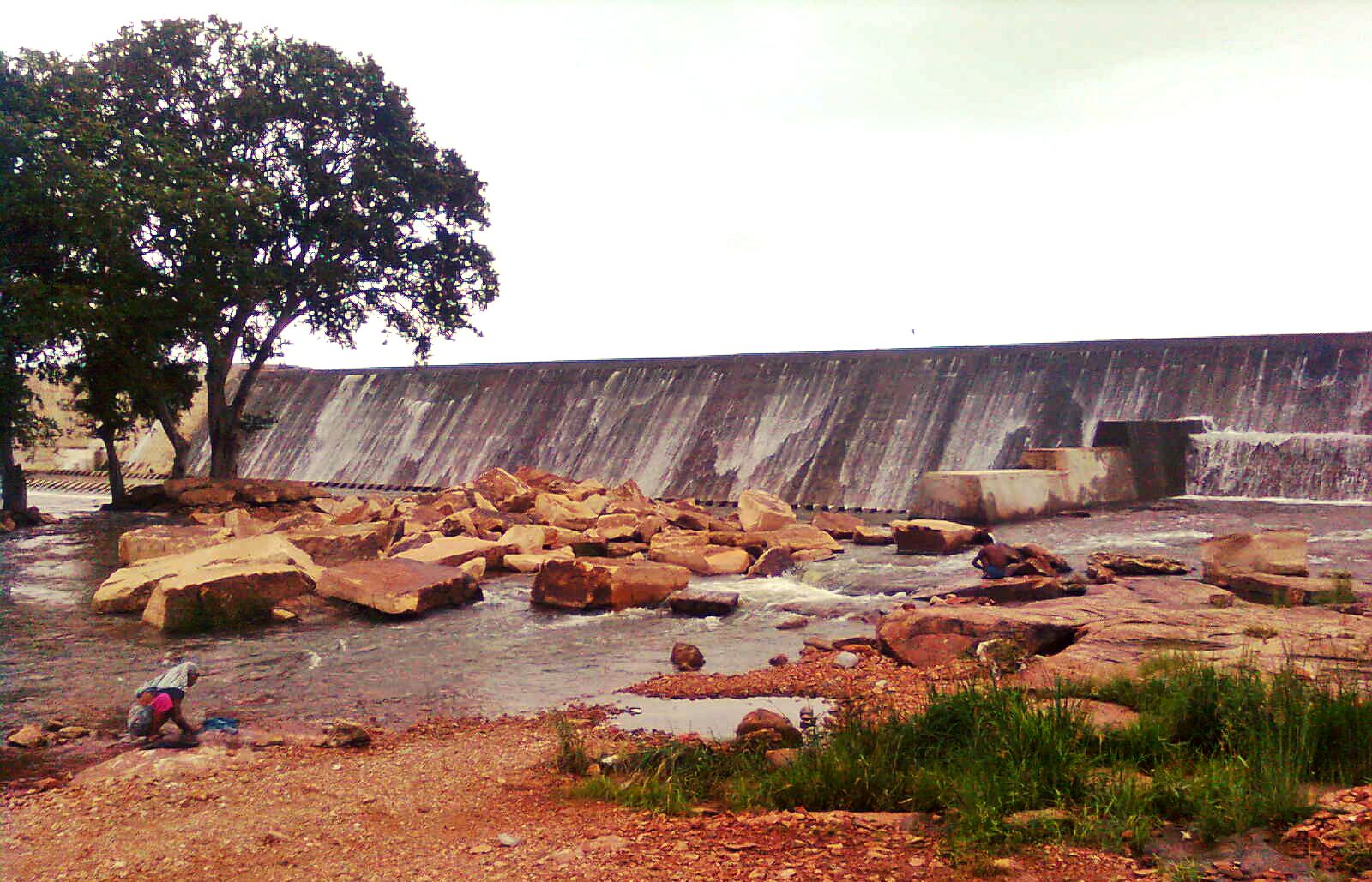
- View of Bardha Dam in Monsoon
- Interactive map of Bardha Dam
- Country: India
- Location: Bundi district, Rajasthan
- Coordinates: 25.2510°N 75.6930°E
- Purpose: Irrigation
- Status: Operational

Dam and spillways
- Type of dam: Gravity dam
- Impounds: Talera River
- Height: 21 ft (6 m)
- Length: 200 m (656 ft)

Bardha Dam is a gravity dam on the Talera river in the deoriya village of Bundi District, Rajasthan, India. It's a popular tourist destination in monsoon season where thousands of tourist come from different districts of Rajasthan state including Kota, Bundi, Baran Jhalawar, Bhilwara and Jaipur.

== History ==
The Bardha dam is an old dam that was constructed in 1872. It was built by British Dewan Robertson of the princely state Bundi for irrigation purposes in the town Alphangagr.

== Architecture and Attraction ==
The length of dam is about 200 meters with a height of about 21 ft. A large number of tourists come during the monsoon season to see the waterfall. People also visit the rocks in the foothills.

Due to the water being clear and the lush greenery, the dam is also known as Goa of Hadoti.

Many types of aquatic birds are seen at this place, including storks, Indian skimmers, and flamingo.
