= Keshava (disambiguation) =

Keshava (IAST: Keśava) is an epithet of the Hindu god Vishnu.

Keshava may also refer to:

- Keshava of Nandigrama, 15th-16th century astronomer and astrologer
- Keshava (musician) (born 2003), Indian tabla player
- Keshava (film), a 2017 Indian action-thriller film by Sudheer Varma
- Keshavdas (1555–1617), Indian poet

== See also ==
- Keshav Puram, a neighborhood of North West Delhi, Delhi, India
  - Keshav Puram metro station
- Keshavpura, a town in the Kota district, Rajasthan, India
