= Satalkheri =

- Census town
- Location in Rajasthan, India Satalkheri (India)
- Coordinates: 24.6672°N 75.9948°E
- Country: India
- State: Rajasthan
- District: Kota

Population (2001)
  - Total: 14,965

Languages
  - Official: Hindi
- Time zone: UTC+5:30 (IST)
- ISO 3166 code: RJ-IN

Satalkheri is a census town in Kota District in the Indian state of Rajasthan.

== Demographics ==
As of 2001 India census, Satalkheri had a population of 14,965. Males constitute 53% of the population and females 47%. Satalkheri has an average literacy rate of 49%, lower than the national average of 59.5%: male literacy is 63%, and female literacy is 33%. In Satalkheri, 21% of the population is under 6 years of age.
