= Lakheri =

Lakheri ACC City, Brick city
- City
- Location in Rajasthan, India Lakheri (India)
- Coordinates: 25.67°N 76.17°E
- Country: India
- State: Rajasthan
- District: Bundi
- Founder: Raav Lakha Gujjar
- Named for: lakha gurjar

Government
  - Type: Nagar Palika
  - Body: Nagar Palika Lakheri
  - Chairman: Mrs. Asha sharma (Indian National Congress)
  - Member of Parliament Kota-Bundi: Om Birla (BJP)
  - Member of Legislative Assembly keshoraipatan: Chandrakanta Meghwal (BJP)

Area
  - Total: 25 km^{2} (9.7 sq mi)
- Elevation: 227 m (745 ft)

Population (2011)
  - Total: 29,572
  - Density: 1,200/km^{2} (3,100/sq mi)

Languages
  - Official: Hindi, English
  - Native: Rajasthani, Harauti
- Time zone: UTC+5:30 (IST)
- PIN: 323603/323615
- Telephone code: 07438
- Vehicle registration: RJ-08
- Sex ratio: 941 ♀/♂

Lakheri is a city and a municipality in Bundi district in the Indian state of Rajasthan. It is located in the southeast of Rajasthan, around 180 kilometres south of the state capital, Jaipur. Lakheri has been a subdivision headquarters since 2002. Yugantar Sharma (RAS) is the Sub-division Officer and magistrate of Lakheri subdivision. It is the second largest city in the district, after Bundi and 104th largest city in rajasthan.

Surrounded mostly by agricultural lands and villages, the most distinct feature of Lakheri is a cement manufacturing unit of Associated Cement Companies Ltd. (ACC). This plant is the longest-running cement plant in Asia having opened in 1912–1913. With the passage of time the plant has undergone expansions to incorporate the latest technology in cement production.

== Geography ==
Lakheri is located at 25.67°N 76.17°E. It is located in southeast Rajsthan, a region widely known as Hadoti, the land of the Hadas. The River Mej passes through outskirts of Lakheri, and serves as the main water source for the city. It has an average elevation of 252 metres (827 ft). Lakheri has fertile land and greenery with irrigation supplied through a series of canals. The city is surrounded on three sides by small hills of Vidhyan range. There is a water pump house on the River Mej with a capacity of 3240 kilolitres per day built by Lakheri's cement works ACC Limited. The Mej dam is also on the river near Lakheri. A small water reservoir and a zigzag dam has been constructed to store rainwater in the town.

Apart from these, there is a small pond named Mahesh Sagar located in the town. Bundi, the district headquarters Bundi is 65 kilometres (40 mi) by bus and Kota is 75 kilometres (47 mi) from the town.

=== Climate ===
lakheri

Climate chart (precipitation, max. and min. temperature)
J	F	M	A	M	J	J	A	S	O	N	D
10 23 11	20 26 13	10 33 19	10 39 25	20 42 29	50 40 29	250 34 26	240 32 26	110 34 25	20 34 22	10 30 16	10 25 12
- █ Average max. and min. temperatures in °C
- █ Precipitation totals in mm
- Source: Kota weather
Imperial conversion
J	F	M	A	M	J	J	A	S	O	N	D
0.4 74 51	0.8 79 55	0.4 91 65	0.4 101 77	0.8 108 85	2 103 83	9.8 92 79	9.4 89 79	4.3 94 77	0.8 93 72	0.4 85 60	0.4 77 54
- █ Average max. and min. temperatures in °F
- █ Precipitation totals in inches

Lakheri has a semi-arid climate (Köppen climate classification BSh) with high temperatures throughout the year. Summers are long, hot, and dry, beginning in late March and lasting until the end of June. The temperatures average above 40 °C (104 °F) in May and June and frequently exceed 45 °C (113 °F); temperatures as high as 49.5 °C (121.1 °F) have been recorded. The monsoon season follows with comparatively lower temperatures, but higher humidity and frequent, torrential downpours. The monsoons subside in October and temperatures rise again. The brief, mild winter starts in late November and lasts until the last week of February. Temperatures hover between 26.7 °C (80.1 °F) (max) and 3.5 °C (38.3 °F) (min). This can be considered the best time to visit Lakheri because of the intense heat in the summer.

The average annual rainfall in the Lakheri is 659 mm (25.9 in). Most of the rainfall can be attributed to the southwest monsoon, which has begins around the last week of June and may last until mid-September. Pre-monsoon showers begin towards the middle of June with post-monsoon rains occasionally occurring in October. The winter is largely dry, although some rainfall does occur as a result of the Western Disturbance passing over the region.

Climate data for Kota (same as Lakheri)
Month	Jan	Feb	Mar	Apr	May	Jun	Jul	Aug	Sep	Oct	Nov	Dec	Year
Record high °C (°F)	33.4 (92.1)	37.0 (98.6)	42.7 (108.9)	48.5 (119.3)	48.4 (119.1)	47.3 (117.1)	44.3 (111.7)	41.0 (105.8)	41.0 (105.8)	40.4 (104.7)	38.0 (100.4)	33.2 (91.8)	48.5 (119.3)
Mean daily maximum °C (°F)	23.7 (74.7)	26.9 (80.4)	32.9 (91.2)	38.8 (101.8)	42.1 (107.8)	40.0 (104.0)	34.2 (93.6)	32.0 (89.6)	33.7 (92.7)	34.3 (93.7)	29.9 (85.8)	25.3 (77.5)	32.8 (91.1)
Mean daily minimum °C (°F)	10.9 (51.6)	13.7 (56.7)	19.1 (66.4)	25.0 (77.0)	29.3 (84.7)	29.2 (84.6)	26.5 (79.7)	25.4 (77.7)	25.0 (77.0)	21.8 (71.2)	16.3 (61.3)	11.9 (53.4)	21.2 (70.1)
Record low °C (°F)	1.8 (35.2)	4.5 (40.1)	8.6 (47.5)	14.0 (57.2)	20.0 (68.0)	18.8 (65.8)	20.4 (68.7)	18.4 (65.1)	16.4 (61.5)	14.1 (57.4)	7.1 (44.8)	3.8 (38.8)	1.8 (35.2)
Average precipitation mm (inches)	5.4 (0.21)	4.4 (0.17)	4.0 (0.16)	3.2 (0.13)	10.3 (0.41)	62.9 (2.48)	257.0 (10.12)	245.8 (9.68)	98.5 (3.88)	19.6 (0.77)	7.8 (0.31)	3.5 (0.14)	722.4 (28.46)
Average rainy days	0.9	1.0	0.6	0.4	2.1	6.9	13.1	15.2	5.6	1.6	1.2	0.5	49.1
Average relative humidity (%)	48	38	25	19	23	43	67	74	58	40	41	48	44
Source 1: Kota weather, India Meteorological Department: (Kota (A) record highs and lows up to 2010), Monthly mean maximum and minimum temperature and rainfall (1961–2000)
Source 2: NOAA (1971–1990)

== Demographics ==
As of the 2011 census of India, Lakheri had a population of 29,572. Males numbered 15,222 (51%), females 14,350 (49%). Lakheri had an average literacy rate of 76.87%, higher than the state average of 66.11%: male literacy was 89.8%, and female literacy was 63.265%. In Lakheri, 13% of the population (3,844) was under six years of age.

Harauti, a dialect of Rajasthani is widely spoken in Lakheri, with Hindi and English being the other languages spoken.

Demographic Distribution of Religion in Kota, Rajasthan
Religion	Percent(%)
Hinduism	83.2%
Islam	14.07%
Jainism	1.34%
Sikhism	0.9%
Christianity	0.4%

According to the 2011 census, Hinduism is the majority religion in the city practised by about 83.2% of the population. Muslims form large minorities (14.07%) followed by Jains (1.34%), Sikhs (0.9%) and Christians (0.4%).

== Transportation ==
The city lies in between the main Delhi - Mumbai line. More than 1000 travelers commute daily from Lakheri to Kota, Jaipur and many other large cities by local train like Dehradun express, Avadh express, Firozpur janta express train. The city was previously bypassed by Indian Railway, which did not provide any passenger train stops. Gradually, train stops have been added, such as Kota Shriganganagar SF, Jodhpur Indore SF, but continuous urge for stoppage of dayodaya SF and jaipur-Mumbai SF has been neglected by Railway Board.

City is also connected to Bundi through SH29 and to Kota and Jaipur through SH1. Bus service in the city is in poor condition as Rajasthan Roadways has no routine bus service and no express, silver line or blue line buses. Two couple of buses one from kota and one from baran to jaipur passes through the town. Although private travellers' buses between indergarh and kota comes every half an hour.

City is looking forward for development as the bharatmala project Delhi-Mumbai route is planned to pass through outskirt of lakheri.

== Health services ==
There is a shortage of medical facilities in the city, except for the presence of the following:

1. Government community health centre
2. ACC hospital
3. Saxena nursing home
4. Other private practitioners

== Education ==
The government and private schools in the city are affiliated with either the Central Board of Secondary Education or Board of Secondary Education, Rajasthan and follow a 10+2 plan. The medium of instruction is either English or Hindi. Kota, the zonal headquarters near Lakheri is known as an education city.

In the past decade the city of Kota has emerged as a popular coaching destination for competitive examspreparation and for-profit educational services. The education sector of Kota has become a major contributor to the city's economy. Kota is popularly referred to as "the coaching capital of India". Over 1.5 lakh students from all over the country flock every year to the city to preparation for various exams such as Indian Institutes of Technology (IIT)-Joint Entrance Examination (JEE), the National Eligibility and Entrance Test (NEET-UG) and AIIMS etc. Many hostels and PGs for students are located in Kota in the vicinity of the coaching centres. Students live here for 2–3 years and prepare for their exams. In the past few years, reports of students committing suicide in the city have increased. According to these reports, students feel stressed and are pressured to crack their target competitive exam. To help students cope, many coaching centres have appointed counselors to help them.

== College ==
1. Maharaja Moolsingh College, Lakheri

== Schools in Lakheri ==
- ACC Works School
- Govt. Sr.Sec. School
- Govt. Girls Sr. Sec. School
- Modern Public School, Nayapura
- Shiv Bal Vidya Mandir Sec. School
- Adarsh Vidhya Mandir
- Blue Bird Public Sec. School
- Pathan Public School
- Sharda Sec. School
- Govt.Sec. School, Station
- Govt.Girls Sec. School, Ishwar Nagar
- New Nehru Children School, Lakheri Gandhipurai
- DAV Public School
- Swami Vivekanand Sec. School, Ganeshpura Lakheri
- Saini Public School

== Lakheri Movie Makers ==
LAKHERI MOVIE MAKERS is a videography and video editing production founded by lakheri based boys Pawan Sharma and Abhinav Meena in year 2014. In year 2017 Lakheri Movie Makers made a documentary LAKHERI DARSHAN which was a social attempt to avail the natural, religious, historical tourism spots and industries of town Lakheri. Lakheri Darshan was directed by Pawan Sharma and the facts regarding documentary was obtained from related persons, internet and book Lakheri Picchaley Panney.

== Places of interest around Lakheri ==
- Lakdeshwar Mahadev Temple
- Raghunath Temple
- Charbhuja Temple
- Chamawali Mata Temple
- Sandal Ke Balaji
- JANKINATH Astal
- Bhoomia Ji Maharaj
- CNI Church
- Dungar Wale Baba
- Sakhawada
- ZIGZAG Dam
- Sukhadia Park
- Toran Ki Bawdi
- manduppa balaji
- Indergarh Fort
