= Udpura =

- Census town
- Location in Rajasthan, India Udpura (India)
- Coordinates: 24.72°N 75.97°E
- Country: India
- State: Rajasthan
- District: Kota
- Elevation: 325 m (1,066 ft)

Population (2001)
  - Total: 8,768

Languages
  - Official: Hindi
- Time zone: UTC+5:30 (IST)
- ISO 3166 code: RJ-IN

Udpura is a census town in Kota District in the Indian state of Rajasthan.

== Geography ==
Udpura is located at 24.72°N 75.97°E. It has an average elevation of 325 metres (1066 feet).

== Demographics ==
As of 2001 India census, Udpura had a population of 8768. Males constitute 54% of the population and females 46%. Udpura has an average literacy rate of 67%, higher than the national average of 59.5%: male literacy is 76%, and female literacy is 57%. In Udpura, 17% of the population is under 6 years of age.
