= Modak, Rajasthan =

Modak
- Town
- Location in Rajasthan, India Modak (India)
- Coordinates: 24.7323°N 75.9569°E
- Country: India
- State: Rajasthan
- District: Kota

Population (2011)
  - Total: 9,204

Languages
  - Official: Hindi
- Time zone: UTC+5:30 (IST)
- ISO 3166 code: RJ-IN
- Vehicle registration: RJ-

Modak is a census town in Kota district in the Indian state of Rajasthan. Modak is in Ramganjmandi Tehsil. It is located 61 km south of Kota, the district headquarters.

== Industry ==
Mangalam Cements Ltd, part of B.K. Birla Group, has a cement plant in Modak to take advantage of limestone mines.

== Demographics ==
As of 2001 India census, Modak has a population of 9,204, with 4,810 males and 4,394 are females. The population of children age of 0-6 was 1203, or 13.07% of the total. The female sex ratio is of 914 against state average of 928. The child sex ratio is 979 compared to Rajasthan state average of 888. The literacy rate is 77.77%, higher than state average of 66.11%. The male literacy is 88.55% while the female literacy rate is 65.83%.

Modak Census Townhas over 2,011 houses to which it supplies basic amenities like water and sewerage. It is also authorize to build roads within census town limits and impose taxes on properties coming under its jurisdiction.

School Education

Modak has one CBSE board school which is managed by DAV College Committee. It also have government schools for primary and higher secondary education.
