= Barod =

Barod is a town in Kota district, Rajasthan, India.
