= Pipalda Tehsil =

Subdivision of Kota District, Rajasthan, India

Pipalda
- Tehsil
- Location within Rajasthan Location within India
- Coordinates: 25°33′22″N 76°25′22″E
- Country: India
- State: Rajasthan
- District: Kota
- Villages: 167

Area
  - Total: 930.51 km^{2} (359.27 sq mi)
- Elevation: 327 m (1,073 ft)

Population (2011)
  - Total: 179,800
  - Density: 193.2/km^{2} (500.5/sq mi)
- Time zone: UTC+5:30 (IST)

Pipalda is a tehsil of Kota District, Rajasthan, India. Its administrative center is the town of Pipalda. As of 2011, it has a total population of 179,800.

== Geography ==
Pipalda is located on the eastern edge of Kota District. Its average elevation is 327 metres above the sea level.

== Administrative divisions ==
Pipalda has a total of 167 villages. Some of the largest are listed as follows:

Census Location Code	Village Name	Population (2011)
101762	Itawa	26,741
101747	Khatauli	10,159
101829	Ayana	5,161
101797	Peepalda Kalan	5,143
101732	Genta	4,802
101755	Talab	3,595
101810	Luhawad	3,494
101784	Karwar	3,399
101773	Ranodiya	2,195
101815	Binayaka	2,123
101799	Peepalda Khurd	2,110
101691	Neemola	2,063
101757	Jorawarpura	2,019
101776	Ganeshganj	1,972
101740	Borda	1,868
101793	Dungarli	1,765
101835	Durjanpura	1,723
101824	Ayani	1,694
101786	Rajopa	1,674
101763	Dadwara	1,610

== Demographics ==
Religion in Pipalda
Religion	Percent
Hinduism	94.58%
Islam	4.89%
Jainism	0.32%
other	0.21%

In 2011, there are 35,968 households and 179,800 residents in Pipalda Tehsil. Among the residents, 93,118 are male and 86,682 are female. The literacy rate is at 58%, with 69.94% of the male population and 45.17% of the female population being literate.

== See also ==
- Kota district
