= Budhpura =

- Census town
- Location in Rajasthan, India Budhpura (India)
- Coordinates: 25.107°N 75.4647°E
- Country: India
- State: Rajasthan
- District: Bundi

Population (2001)
  - Total: 4,387

Languages
  - Official: Hindi
- Time zone: UTC+5:30 (IST)
- ISO 3166 code: RJ-IN

Budhpura is a census town in Bundi district in the state of Rajasthan, India.

== Demographics ==
As of 2001 Indian census, Budhpura had a population of 4387. Males constitute 54% of the population and females 46%. Budhpura has an average literacy rate of 25%, lower than the national average of 59.5%; with male literacy of 35% and female literacy of 13%. 20% of the population is under 6 years of age.
