= Kumbhkot =

- Census town
- Location in Rajasthan, India Kumbhkot (India)
- Coordinates: 24.6229°N 75.9948°E
- Country: India
- State: Rajasthan
- District: Kota

Area
  - Total: 4.89 km^{2} (1.89 sq mi)

Population (2011)
  - Total: 6,602
  - Density: 1,350/km^{2} (3,500/sq mi)

Languages
  - Official: Hindi
- Time zone: UTC+5:30 (IST)
- ISO 3166 code: RJ-IN

Kumbhkot is a census town in Kota district in the Indian state of Rajasthan.

== Demographics ==
As of 2001, according to the India census, Kumbhkot had a population of 5,857. Males constitute 58% of the population and females 42%. Kumbhkot has an average literacy rate of 44%, lower than the national average of 65%: male literacy is 62%, and female literacy is 24%. In Kumbhkot, 30% of the population is under 6 years of age.

As of 2011, according to the India census, Kumbhkot population had risen to 6,602. Males constitute 54% of the population and females 46%. Kumbhkot has an average literacy rate of 48%, still lower than the national average of 74%. Male literacy is 61%, and female literacy is 34%. 18.5% of the population is under 6 years of age.
