= Keshoraipatan =

- City
- K.Patan Bundi
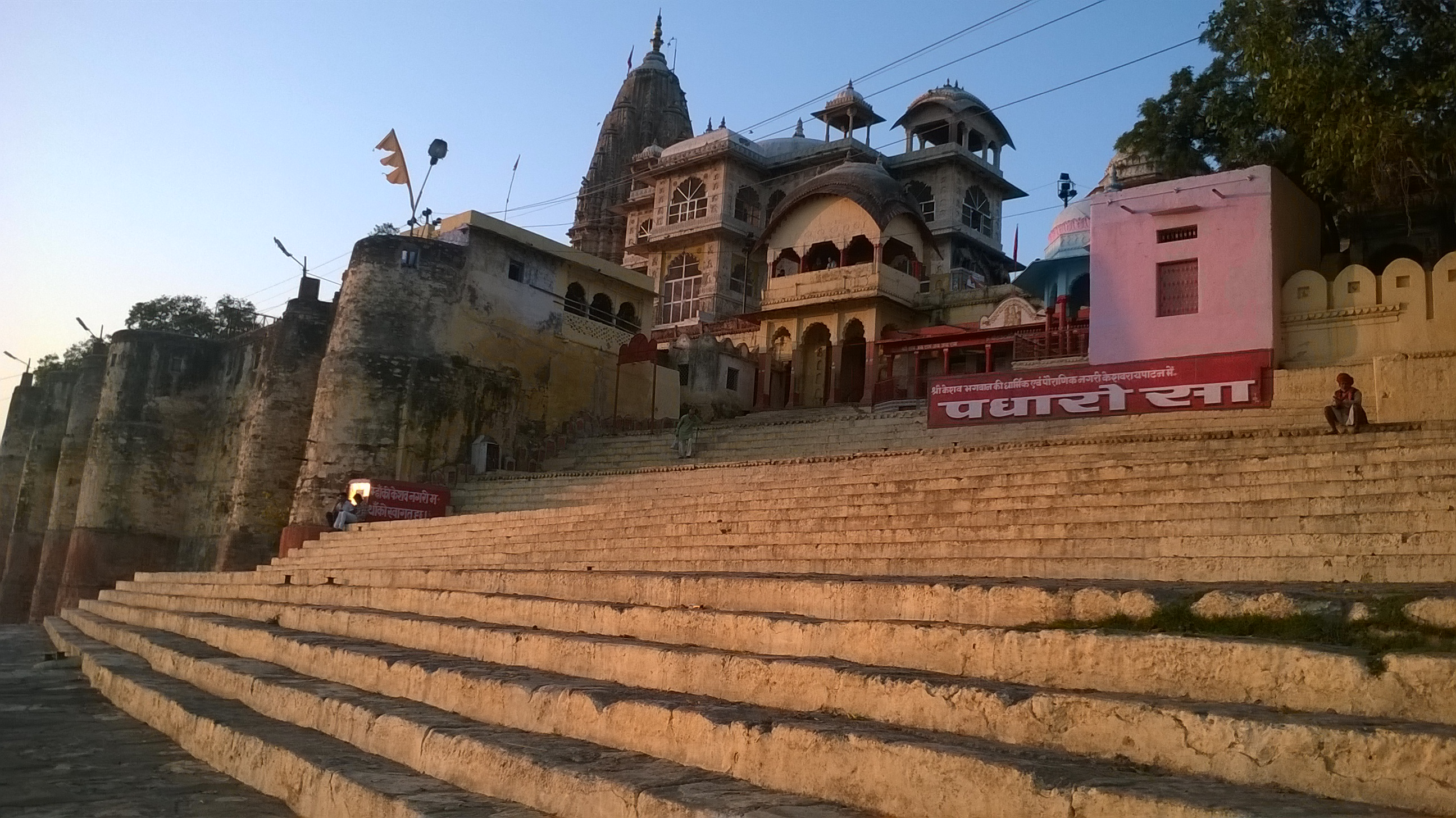

- Location in Rajasthan, India Keshoraipatan (India)
- Coordinates: 25°18′N 75°56′E
- Country: India
- State: Rajasthan
- Division: Bundi
- District (zilla): Bundi

Population (2011)
  - Total: 24,627

Languages
  - Official: HADOTI HINDI
- Time zone: UTC+5:30 (IST)
- PIN: 323601 323602
- Telephone code: 07438
- Vehicle registration: RJ 08(bundi district)

Keshoraipatan is a city in Bundi district in the state of Rajasthan, India.

According to the census of 2011, the population of the town was 24,627.

== Notable sites ==
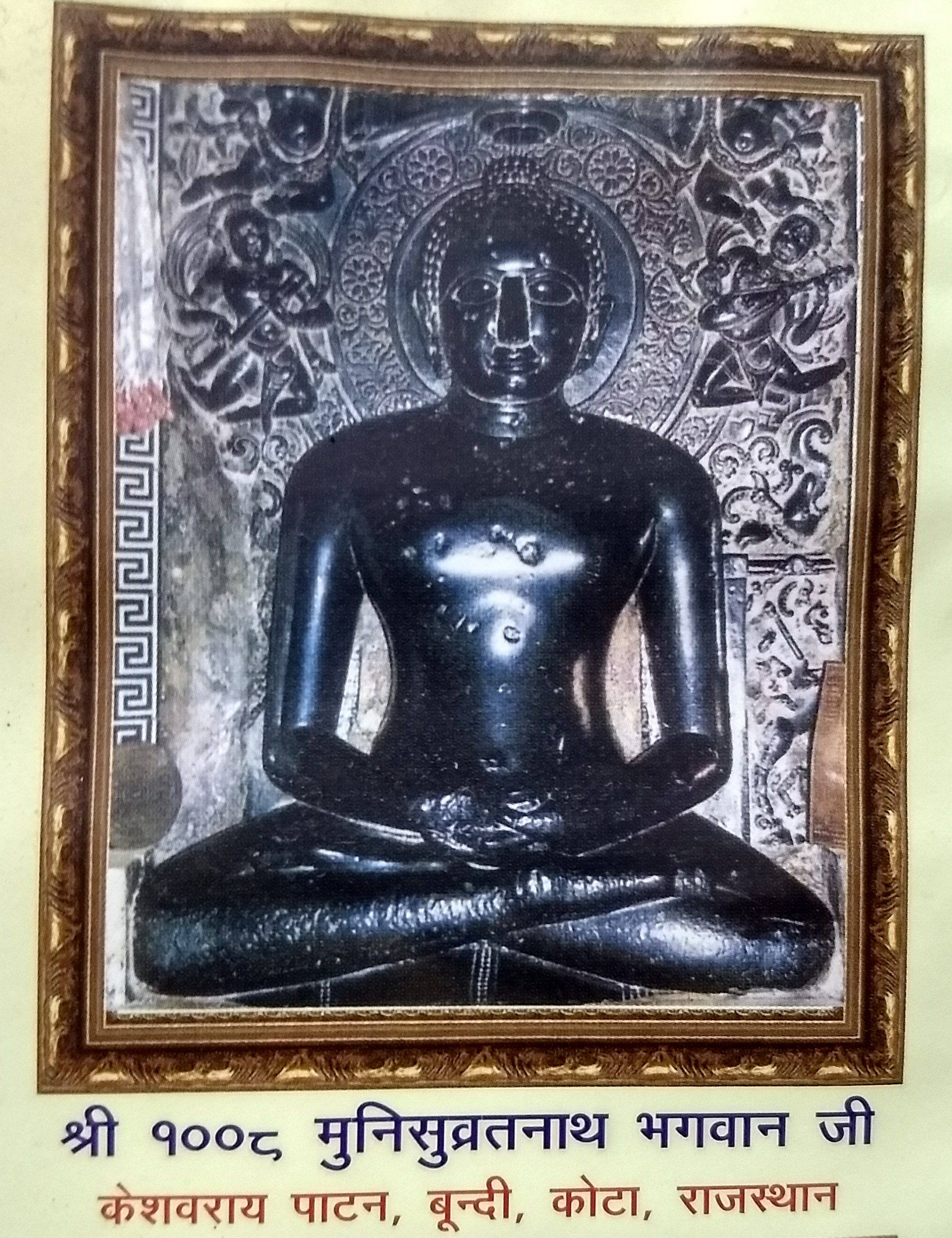
Munisuvrata statue at Keshoraipatan Jain temple

- Keshoraipatan Jain temple is a Jain temple to Munisuvrata, the twentieth Tirthankara of Jainism. The temple is known for its architecture and detailed sculptures. Nemichandra, a 10th-century Jain Acharya, composed Laghudravya Saṁgraha there.

== See also ==
- Sarsala
