= Panahera =

Village in Rajasthan, India

Panahera is a village in the Sangod Tehsil of Kota district of Rajasthan, India. It is situated at a distance of 55 kilometres (34 mi) from the Kota city. The nearby towns are Sangod (9 km) kanwas 8 km. The Kali Sindh River flows nearby this village and is the main source of irrigation. There is an upper primary school government school in the village. The population of the village is around 838 according to 2011 census of India.
