= Hindoli =

- Town
- Location in Rajasthan, India Hindoli (India)
- Coordinates: 25.40°N 75.83°E
- Country: India
- State: Rajasthan
- District: Bundi

Government
  - Type: Panchayati raj
- Elevation: 305 m (1,001 ft)

Population (2011)
  - Total: 9,601

Languages
  - Official: Hindi
  - Regional: Hadoti
- Time zone: UTC+5:30 (IST)
- PIN: 323023
- ISO 3166 code: RJ-IN
- Vehicle registration: RJ 08

Hindoli is a small town in the Bundi district of Rajasthan, India. Situated in the lap of the Arawalli Hills, the town is a trade center for many small villages.

Police Station of Hindoli is honored as "Adarsh Police Thana" for maintaining low crime rate, high peace and providing quick response.

== History ==
- Hindoli has a temple of Hindu lord Shiva named Hundeswar Mahadev, which was made up by Pandava
- Ghatotkacha (son of Bhima) of Mahabharata was born in Hindoli.
- Harana around 4 km away from Hindoli is birthplace of great Hindi poet Suryamal Mishrana

== Geography ==
Hindoli is on National Highway Number 52. Hindoli is surrounded by small hills.

== Connectivity ==
It is directly connected to Jaipur - the capital of Rajasthan. Hindoli is 190 km from Jaipur and 65 km from Kota - a district in Rajasthan that is famous for its industries and coaching institutes.

== Tourist places ==
You can have a tour to Hindoli to the following places:

- A big lake - Ramsagar lake in Hindoli, that is surrounded by hills and trees
- An old fort that speaks glorious history of Hindoli
- Triveni Chowk - 3 old Hindu Temples built in Hindu temple architecture facing a pole at center
- Paal Bhagh - A garden on the banks of Ramsagar lake
- BarahDwari - A small auditorium having 12 gates in Paal Bhagh garden
- Bijasan Mata Mandir(on the hill)

== Places of interest ==
- Haweli and birthplace of Suryamal Mishrana
- Pal Bagh is surrounded by different temples on all sides. You will find greenery here and Ram Sagar lake as well, from playing grounds to mountains for trekking.
- Sahaspuriya MAHLA Fort of Hada's Brothers Kharodiya Raoraja (5 km from Hindoli) one of the oldest forts of Rajputana
- Cheelghati Balaji temple which is situated on a big mountain
- Historical Veer Tejaji temple
- Shiv temple (made by Pandva's) it have an interesting tale
- Historacal Bokreshwar Mahadev, Devnarayan bhagwan and Veer tejaji temple at village NEGARH of hindoli tehsil
- imali wale dev [bks]
- Ganesh ji ki bavdi
- Pilot Stadium

== Educational Institutes ==
- Govt Higher Secondary School
- Aadarsh vidhya mandir
- APS college
- Ebenezer public school
- Swami Vivekanand Government Model School (CBSE)
- Sekhawati public school.
- Sunrise Academy
- Govt. College Hindoli
- Govt agriculture college
- Madrsa talimul Quran
- Shree ram coaching classes
- Shree Ram shikshan Sansthan

== Politics ==
Hindoli is a constituency of Rajasthan.

Hindoli is an important state constituency in Rajasthan for all the political parties.

Main players in Hindoli are Congress(I) and BJP (Bharthiya Janata Party). Political parties always try to get vote using some calculations of castes. Gurjjar and Saini (Mali)castes contribute as more than 60% of total votes.

- Member of Parliament (MP) : Mr.Subhash Baheria (BJP)
- Member of Lagisleture Assembly (MLA) : Mr. Ashok Chandna(Congress)
