= Sangod =

- city
- Location in Rajasthan, India Sangod (India)
- Coordinates: 24.92°N 76.28°E
- Country: India
- State: Rajasthan
- District: Kota
- Named for: Sanga

Government
  - Type: BJP
- Elevation: 256 m (840 ft)

Population (2011)
  - Total: 21,842

Languages
  - Official: Hindi
- Time zone: UTC+5:30 (IST)
- Postal code: 325601
- Vehicle registration: Rj 20 RJ 33

Sangod is a city and a municipality in Kota district in the Indian state of Rajasthan.Sangod is also a Legislative Assembly heeralal naagar is energy minister & the Member of Legislative Assembly (MLA) from Sangod. Current SHO of sangod police station is Bharat Singh. Kavita gehlot is Chairman of nagar palika of Sangod.and the City sangod is named upon sanga gurjar who defeated meens and jaats and name this city upon his name sangod for his victory

== Geography ==
Sangod is located at 24.92°N 76.28°E on the Ujad river. It has an average elevation of 256 metres (839 feet). sangod is 3rd biggest city of kota district after kota & ramganjmandi

== Demographics ==
2011 India census, Sangod had a population of 21842. Males constitute 52% of the population and females 48%. Sangod has an average literacy rate of 64%, higher than the national average of 59.5%: male literacy is 76%, and female literacy is 52%. In Sangod, 17% of the population is under 6 years of age.In 2023, the population of Sangod was 29,900.
