= Keshavpura =

Town in India

Coordinates: 21°55′N 75°54′E

Keshavpura is a town in the Kota district of Rajasthan in India. The town has been divided into 10 sectors. Keshavpura has its own culture and traditions. Most people of Keshavpura speak Harauti. Dewali, Holi, Rakhi, Eid, Teej, Gangor, Makar Sankranti are the most famous festivals of Keshavpura. Besides all there are some more interesting festival like DHOL Ekadesh, Anat chaturdeshi, Karva chouth, Shravani Amavas, Sheetal Asthami. People of different religions can be found there, but most are Hindu or Muslim. The pincode for Keshavpura is 324009.
