= Bijasan Mata Temple, Indragarh =

Bijasan Mata Temple
- Location in Rajasthan

Religion
- Affiliation: Hinduism
- District: Indragarh, Bundi
- Deity: Bijasan Mata
- Festival: Navratri

Location
- State: Rajasthan
- Country: India
- Interactive map of Bijasan Mata Temple
- Coordinates: 25.73292°N 76.16594°E

Bijasan Mata Temple is a renowned Hindu temple situated in the town of Indragarh, nestled amidst the scenic landscape of Bundi district in the Indian state of Rajasthan. The temple is dedicated to Bijasan Mata, which is another name of Hindu Goddess Durga. Goddess Durga beheaded the demon named Raktabija, after that she made that demon a seat and sat on it, hence she came to be known by the name Bijasan Mata.

Situated in a cave in the Aravalli mountain range, this temple is said to be more than two thousand years old. Every year millions of devotees from the state, country and abroad come to darshan of the Goddess Bijasan.

== Geography ==
This temple is situated at a high hill of Aravalli mountain range in Indragarh town of Bundi district. Devotees have to climb more than 750 stairs to have darshan here.

== History ==
According to the locals here, about two thousands of years ago there was a dense forest in the temple area. At that time, Siddha Saint Baba Kripanath Ji Maharaj had arrived here while traveling from somewhere. He made his place on a high hill of Aravalli mountains at this place and started worshiping the goddess Bijasan. According to the belief, being pleased with his sadhana, the Goddess Bijasan appeared and gave him physical darshan. After this, Mother Goddess appeared in a small cave on the same high hill.

== Architecture ==
The temple is built like a cave. Within the temple, there is an idol of goddess Bijasan. Which is claimed as self-manifested. Here seven sisters of Goddess Navdurga are worshiped. A temple of 6 sisters of Durga is built below. There are 750 stairs in the temple.

== Accessibility ==
Temple is easily accessible by road from various parts of Bundi district. The nearest railway station is located in indarghar sumerganj mandi, approximately 10 kilometers away, while the nearest airport is in Jaipur, around 200 kilometers from Indragarh.

== Festivals and celebrations ==
The temple becomes a hub of festivities during Navratri, a nine-night festival dedicated to honoring Goddess Durga in her various manifestations. Millions of devotees from various states of the country including Rajasthan, Uttar Pradesh, Madhya Pradesh, and Gujarat flock to the temple during this auspicious period to take part in religious rituals. The entire temple complex is adorned with colorful decorations and illuminated with traditional lamps, creating an enchanting atmosphere.

== See also ==
- Bijasan Mata Temple, Indore
- Bijasan Mata Temple, Salkanpur
