= Ram Kalyan Sharma =

Indian independence activist (1912–1947)

Shaheed Ram Kalyan Sharma
- राम कल्याण शर्मा
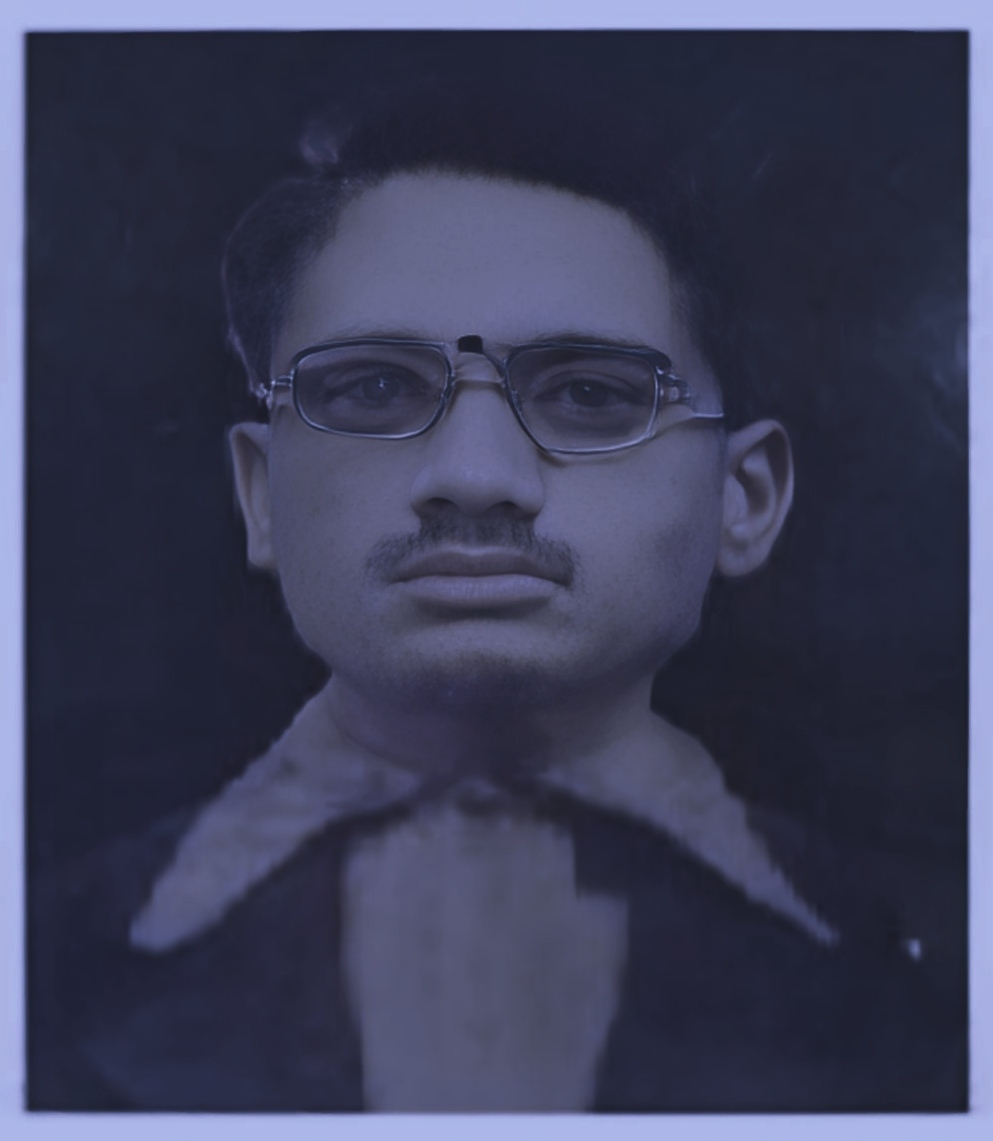
- Born: 8 January 1912; Bundi State, Rajasthan
- Died: 11 August 1947 (aged 35); Bundi, Rajasthan
- Cause of death: Execution by firing squad
- Monuments: Shaheed Ram Kalyan Smarak, Bundi
- Education: Bachelor of Laws
- Occupation: Advocate
- Movement: Quit India Movement
- Spouse: Bhawari Bai
- Father: Bajran Lal Sharma

Ram Kalyan Sharma (8 January 1912 — 11 August 1947) was an Indian revolutionary who played a role in India's independence movement.

== Early life ==
Ram Kalyan Sharma was born on 8 January 1912 in Bundi, Rajasthan. He was involved in revolutionary activities at a young age, inspired by Bhagat Singh and Chandra Shekhar Azad.

== Legacy ==
On 11 August 1947, Ram Kalyan left home for Hindoli Court. When he reached Nahar ka Chohatta in Bundi after leaving his daughters at school, he got a message that no one could lead the Motor Trade Association procession. He volunteered. Sharma's procession was blocked by the police.

Aerial firing and the resulting stampede caused people to climb trees. Sharma remained along with others carrying the flag and sat on the ground carrying the tricolor flag. Sharma rejected British warnings to stop the procession, leave the flag, and leave, appealing to his family.

The police opened fire, and he collapsed while holding the tricolor flag. He was taken to the hospital and succumbed to his injuries on 11 August 1947. He died 4 days before India gained independence from the United Kingdom.

A memorial in his honor, Shaheed Ram Kalyan Smarak, was established in Bundi. Several streets were named in recognition of his contributions.

== Personal life ==
Ram Kalyan Sharma married Bhawari Bai. Their son Chail Bihari Sharma became involved in legal proceedings.

== See also ==
- Nanak Bheel
- Pandit Nayanuram Sharma
