= Sarsala =

- village
- Country: India
- State: Rajasthan
- District: Bundi

Languages
  - Official: Hindi
- Time zone: UTC+5:30 (IST)
- ISO 3166 code: RJ-IN
- Vehicle registration: RJ-

Sarsala is a village in Bundi district, in the state of Rajasthan in northwest India. It is situated near Bhimber road. It is an old village. Lohars and Rajas are famous families in this village.
