= Itawa, Pipalda =

Town in Rajasthan, India

Itawa
- Town
- Location within Rajasthan Location within India
- Coordinates: 25°32′24″N 76°22′45″E
- Country: India
- State: Rajasthan
- District: Kota
- Tehsil: Pipalda

Area
  - Total: 2.91 km^{2} (1.12 sq mi)
- Elevation: 225 m (738 ft)

Population (2011)
  - Total: 26,741
  - Density: 9,190/km^{2} (23,800/sq mi)
- Time zone: UTC+5:30 (IST)
- PIN: 325004

Itawa is a town in Pipalda Tehsil, Kota District, Rajasthan, India. It is located near the state boundary with Madhya Pradesh, about 79 kilometres northeast of the district seat Kota, and 5 kilometres southwest of the tehsil seat Pipalda. As of 2011, the town has a population of 26,741.

== Geography ==
Itawa is situated to the south of Fatehpura and Rajopa Villages, west of Khorawada Village, north of Gondi Village, and east of Dadwara Village. Rajasthan State Highway 1 passes through the west of the town. Its average elevation is at 225 metres above the sea level.

== Climate ==
Itawa has a Hot Semi-arid Climate. It receives the most abundant rainfall in July, with 264 mm of precipitation; and the most scarce rainfall in April, with 3 mm of precipitation.

Climate data for Itawa
Month	Jan	Feb	Mar	Apr	May	Jun	Jul	Aug	Sep	Oct	Nov	Dec	Year
Mean daily maximum °C (°F)	23.4 (74.1)	27.4 (81.3)	33.4 (92.1)	39.3 (102.7)	42.2 (108.0)	39.4 (102.9)	32.9 (91.2)	30.9 (87.6)	32.6 (90.7)	33.9 (93.0)	29.8 (85.6)	25.1 (77.2)	32.5 (90.5)
Daily mean °C (°F)	16.6 (61.9)	20.2 (68.4)	25.8 (78.4)	31.7 (89.1)	35.5 (95.9)	34.2 (93.6)	29.3 (84.7)	27.7 (81.9)	28.2 (82.8)	27.3 (81.1)	22.9 (73.2)	18.1 (64.6)	26.5 (79.6)
Mean daily minimum °C (°F)	10 (50)	13.1 (55.6)	17.9 (64.2)	23.4 (74.1)	28.4 (83.1)	29.3 (84.7)	26.3 (79.3)	25.1 (77.2)	24.2 (75.6)	20.8 (69.4)	16.5 (61.7)	11.7 (53.1)	20.6 (69.0)
Average rainfall mm (inches)	7 (0.3)	7 (0.3)	5 (0.2)	3 (0.1)	6 (0.2)	79 (3.1)	264 (10.4)	243 (9.6)	78 (3.1)	13 (0.5)	6 (0.2)	7 (0.3)	718 (28.3)
Source: Climate-Data.org

== Demographics ==
By 2011, Itawa hosts 5,257 households and 26,741 inhabitants. Out of the total population, 13,898 are male and 12,843 are female. The total literacy rate is 63.88%, with 10,273 of the male population and 6,808 of the female population being literate. The village's census location code is 101762.
