= Pholai =

Village in Rajasthan state, India

Pholai फोलाई
- Village
- Country: India
- State: Rajasthan
- District: Bundi
- Tehsil: Bundi
- Time zone: UTC+5:30 (IST)
- PIN: 323001
- Vehicle registration: RJ-08

Pholai is a village in the Bundi district of Rajasthan state, India. It is famous for temples to Lord Shiva, the Bhognath Ji and Somnath Ji, and to Lord Ganesha. These temples are located in the Aravalli Mountains. Kanchandham is another famous temple in the area, one of Lord Krishna, which is visited by foreigners occasionally.
