= Dabi, India =

Village in Bundi district, Rajasthan, India

Coordinates: 25.097°N 75.515°E

Dabi is a village in Bundi district, Rajasthan, India. At the 2011 census the village had a population of 9,818.
