= Bijasan Mata Temple, Indore =

Bijasan Mata Temple

Religion
- Affiliation: Hinduism
- District: Indore
- Deity: Durga

Location
- Location: Indore
- State: Madhya Pradesh
- Country: India
- Interactive map of Bijasan Mata Temple
- Coordinates: 22°43′49″N 75°47′54″E

Bijasan Mata Temple is one of the temples of the Hindu goddess Durga, situated in Indore District of Madhya Pradesh, India. This temple is built in the year 1760 by Shivaji Rao Holkar. This temple is visited by thousands of devotees during Navaratri.

== Festivals ==
The main festivals celebrated here are Navaratri. During the nine-day Navaratri festival, fare is also organized here every year.

== Connectivity ==
The temple is at a distance of 9.8 kilometers from the Indore railway station. Devi Ahilya Bai Holkar International Airport is visible from the hill on which Bijasan Mata Temple is situated. The temple is connected with proper roadways.

== See also ==
- Gajanan Maharaj Temple, Indore
- Khajrana Ganesh Temple
