= Hadoti =

Region of Rajasthan, India

- Historical Region
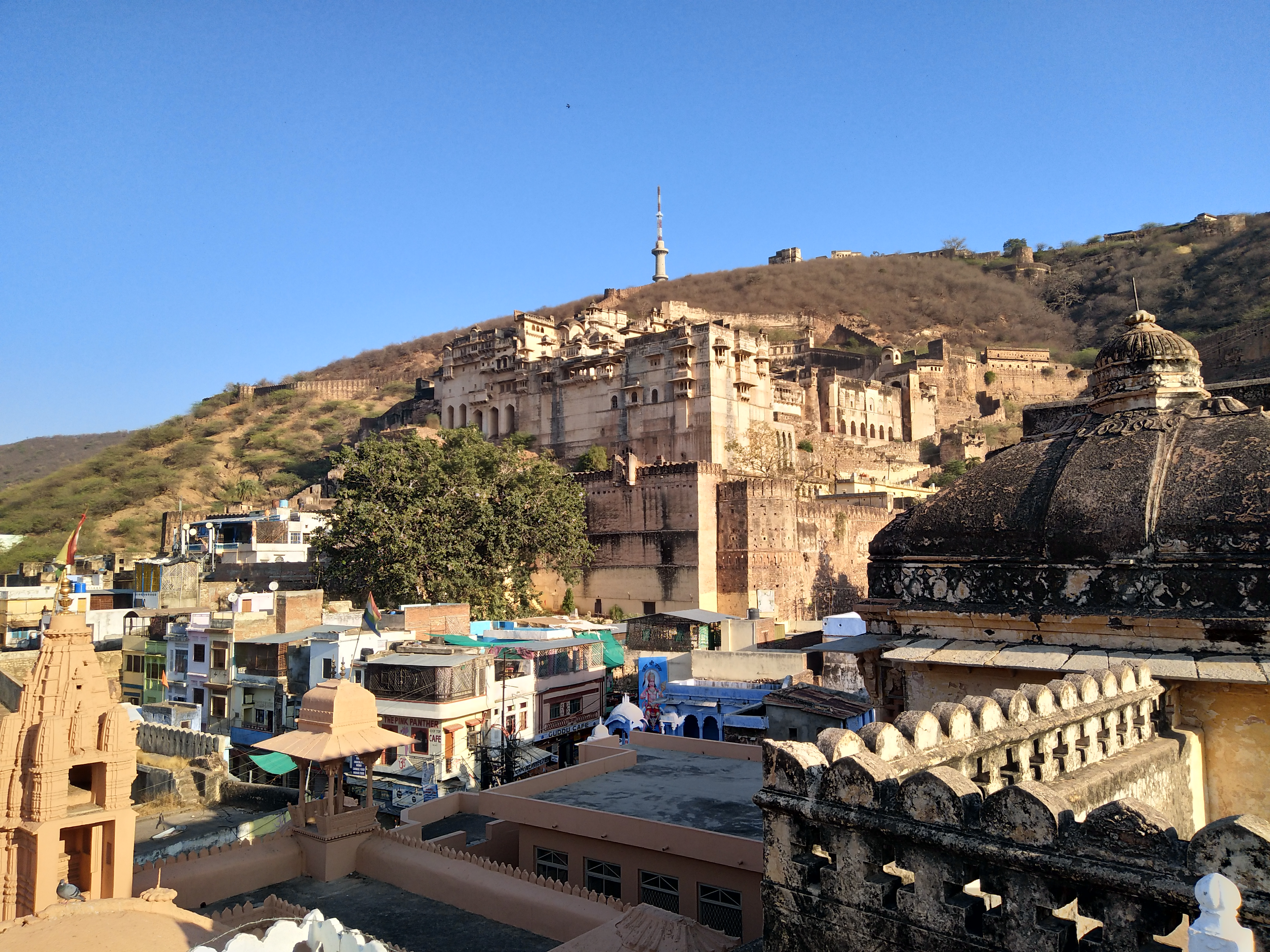
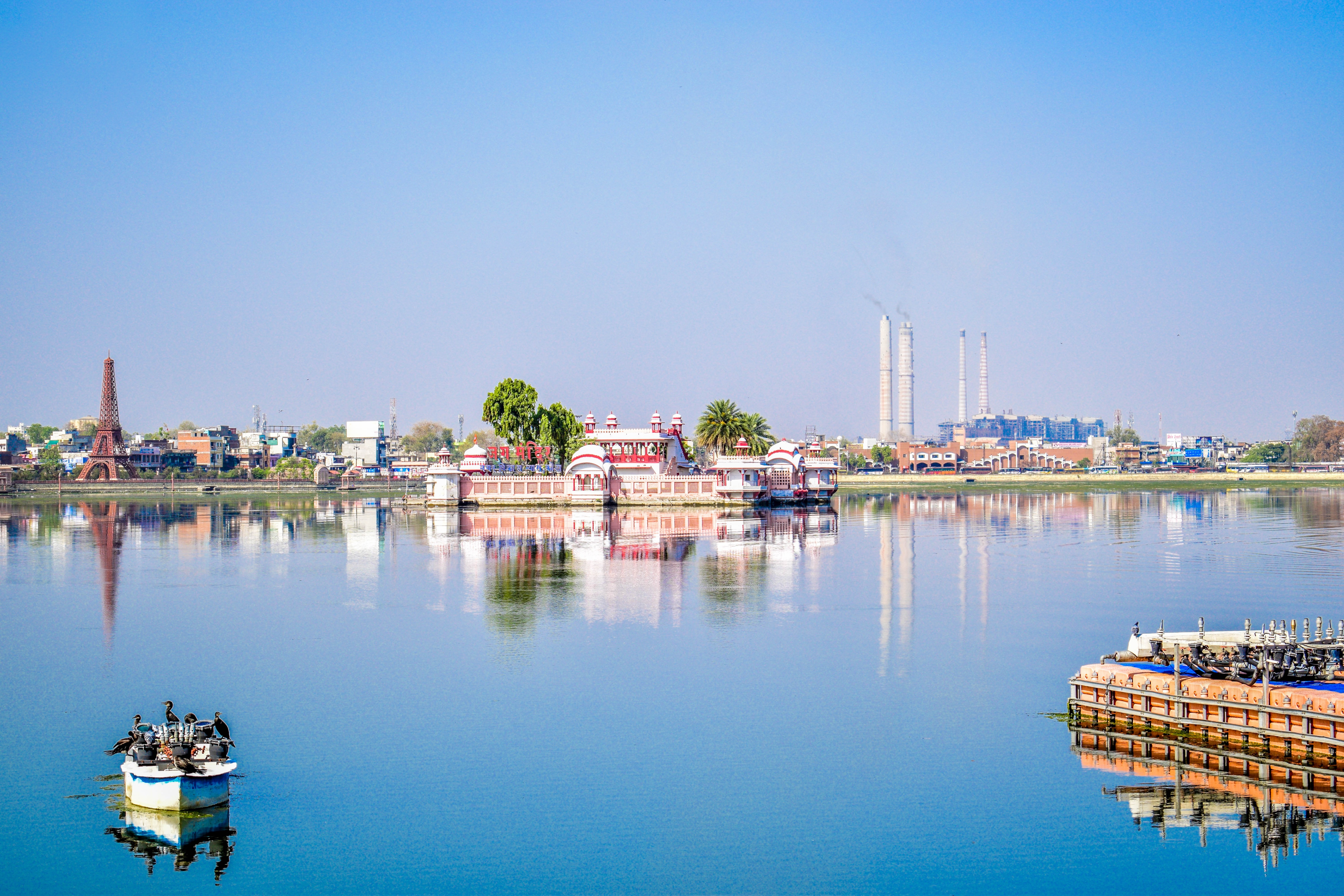
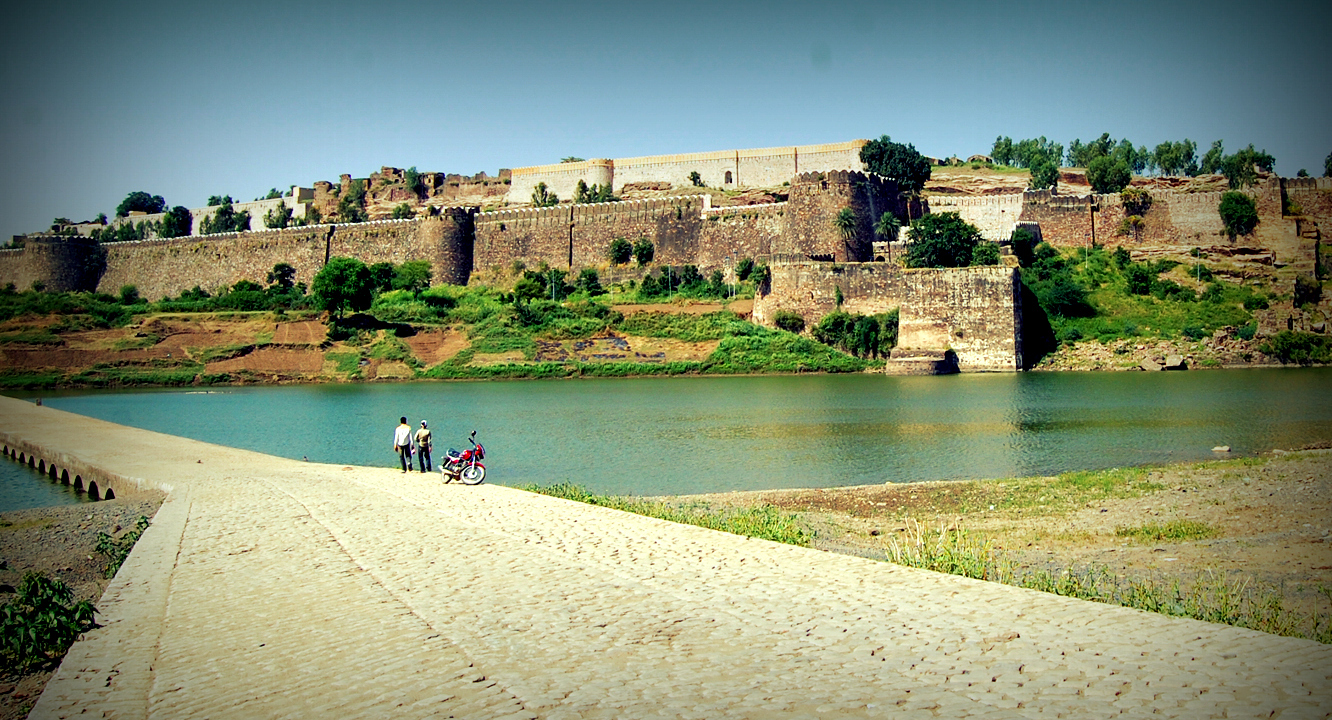
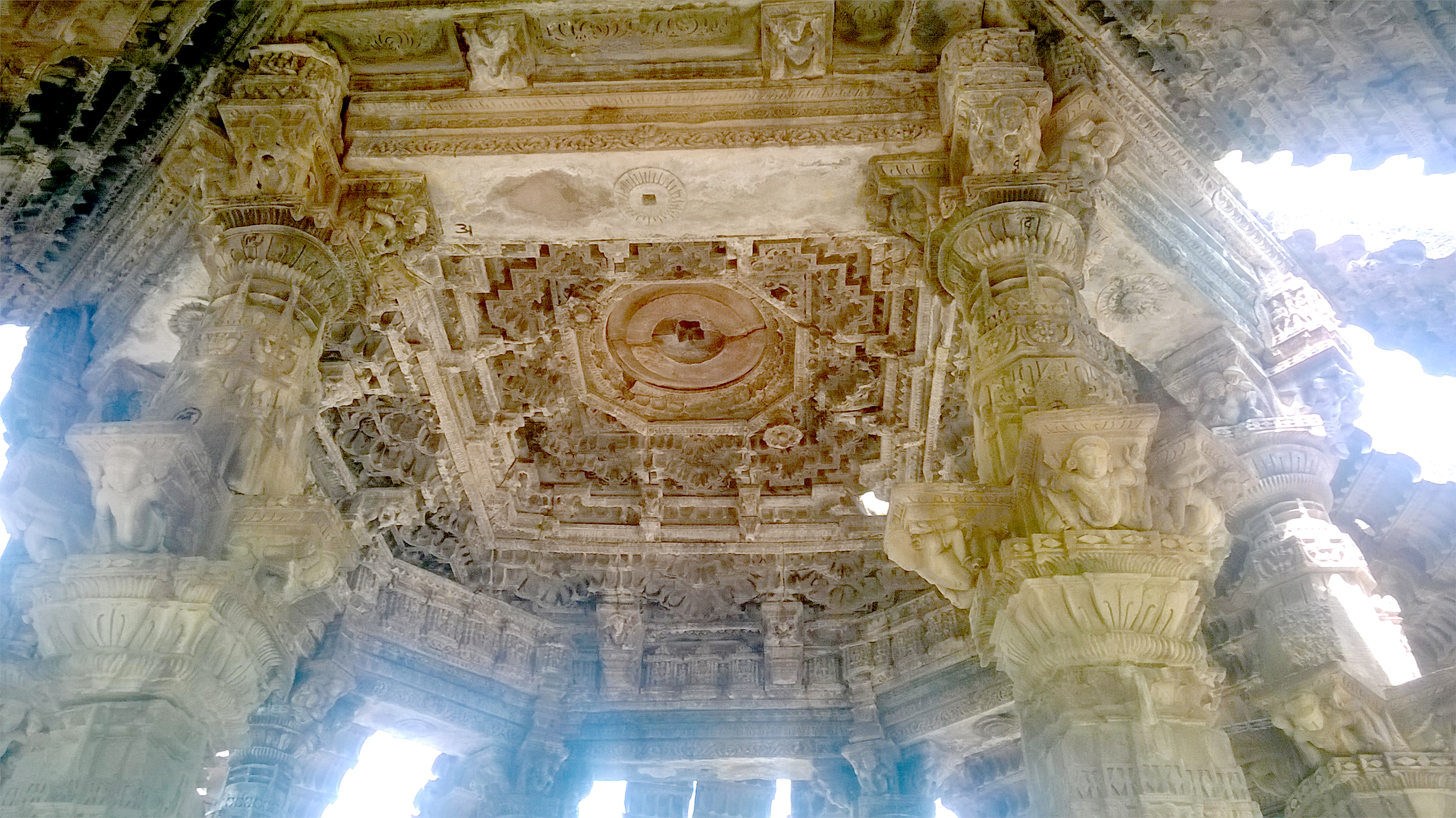
- The Garh Palace, Bundi Jag Mandir Palace, Kota Gagron Fort, Jhalawar Bhand Deva Temple, Baran

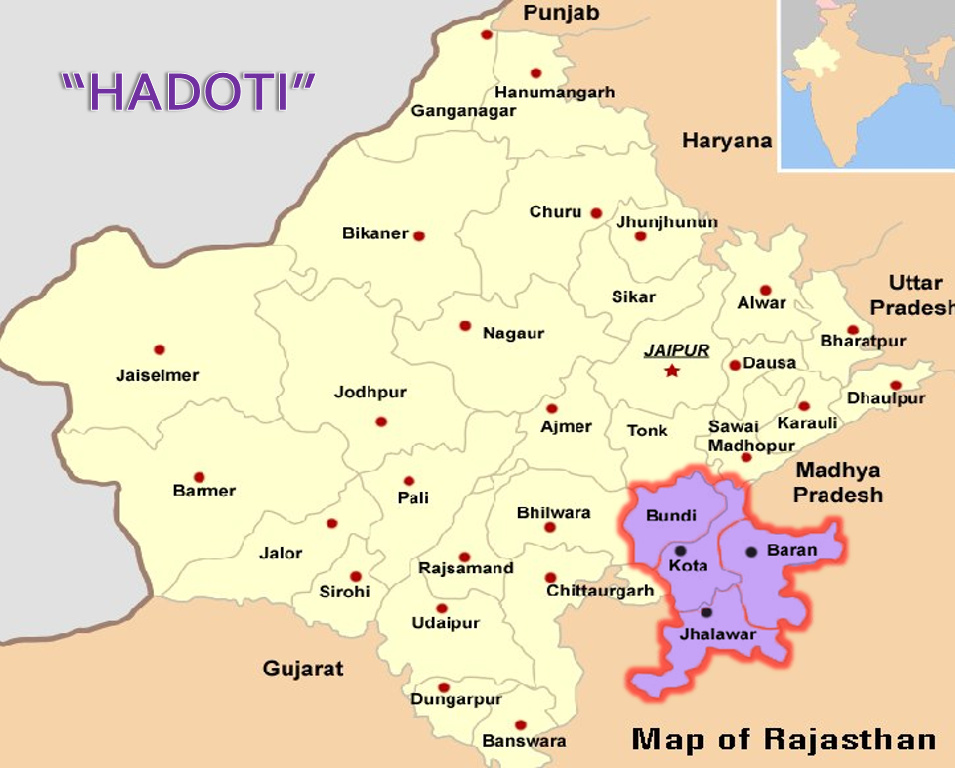
- Map of the Hadoti region in Rajasthan, India
- Country: India
- State: Rajasthan
- Established: 1241 CE
- Founder: Rao Deva Hada
- Named for: Hada Chauhan
- Districts: List: Bundi; Baran; Jhalawar; Kota

Area
  - Total: 24,204 km^{2} (9,345 sq mi)

Population (2011)
  - Total: 5,695,804
  - Density: 235.32/km^{2} (609.49/sq mi)

Languages
  - Hadoti: 51.57%
  - Hindi: 32.76%
  - Malvi: 5.51%
- Largest City: Kota

Hadoti is a historical region located in the southeastern part of the Indian state of Rajasthan. It encompasses the districts of Bundi, Kota, Jhalawar, and Baran. Named after the Hada Rajputs, a branch of the Chauhan clan, the region's identity began taking shape in the 13th century when Rao Deva conquered Bundi in 1241 CE, followed by the capture of Kota in 1264 CE. The Hadoti region contains a significant number of rock paintings, particularly in regions like Dara and Alnia, indicating human presence during the mesolithic age.

== Geography ==
The south-eastern region of Rajasthan, also known as Hadoti, lies between the Malwa Plateau to the east, the Aravalli Range to the west, and the Marwar Plateau to the southwest, bordering the state of Madhya Pradesh. The major river of the region is the Chambal River, along with its tributaries — the Kalisindh, Parvati, Parwan, and Chapi rivers. The predominant soil type in the region is alluvial, supporting extensive agriculture.

== Demographics ==
=== Religion ===
Religion in Hadoti (2011)
1. Hinduism (89.8%)
2. Islam (8.54%)
3. Jainism (0.96%)
4. Others (0.75%)

The vast majority of the population are Hindu. Muslims form the largest minority and are largely concentrated in urban areas.

=== Languages ===
Languages in Hadoti (2011)
1. Hadauti (51.6%)
2. Hindi (32.8%)
3. Malvi (5.51%)
4. Sondwari (3.53%)
5. Rajasthani (2.30%)
6. Urdu (1.30%)
7. Others (3.03%)

Hadauti is the main language spoken in the region. Hindi is popular in urban areas like Kota. Malvi and Sondwari, a distinct dialect of Malwi, is spoken in the southern and western parts of Jhalawar along with Hindi.

== Notable people ==
- Bhupendra Jadawat

Actor Film Industry Mumbai Bollywood

- Om Birla

Speaker, Lok Sabha

== See also ==
- Marwar
- Mewar
- Shekhawati
- Bagar
- Dhundhar
- Vagad
