= Hadauti language =

Rajasthani language spoken in India

Hadauti
- Hadoti
- हाड़ौती, हाड़ोती
- The word "Hadauti" in Devanagari script
- Native to: India
- Region: Hadoti
- Native speakers: 2,944,356 (2011 census); Census results conflate some speakers with Hindi.
- Language family: Indo-European: Indo-Iranian; Indo-Aryan; Western; Rajasthani; Hadauti
- Writing system: Devanagari

Language codes
- ISO 639-3: hoj
- Glottolog: hado1235
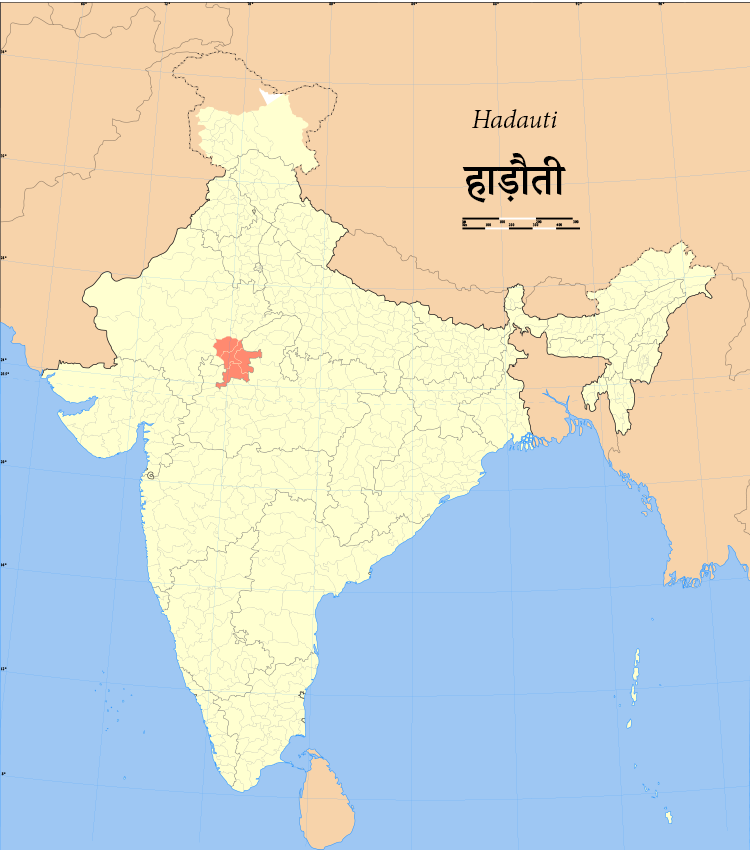
- A map of the distribution of native Hadauti speakers in India

Hadauti or Harauti (Hadoti) is an Indo-Aryan language of Rajasthani languages group spoken by approximately four million people in the Hadoti region of southeastern Rajasthan, India. Its speakers are concentrated in the districts of Kota, Baran, Bundi and Jhalawar in Rajasthan, as well as in neighbouring areas of Madhya Pradesh.

It has a nominative marker /nɛ/, which is absent in other Rajasthani languages.

Its word order is the typical subject–object–verb. Its characteristic feature, unlike Hindi, is the presence or absence of agentive marker in the perfect depending on the nature of the accusative marker.

== Some sample translations ==
Standard Rajasthani	Harauti	Meaning
अठै (atthai)	अठी (atthee)	Here
वठै/उठै (vatthai/utthai)	वठी/उठी (vatthee/utthee)	There
कोनी (koni)	कोइने/कोने(koine)	No
आवैलो/आवैली (availo/availi)	आवगो/आवगी (avogo/avogi)	Will come

== Writing system ==
In India, Hadauti is written in the Devanagari script, an abugida which is written from left to right. Earlier, the Mahajani script, or Modiya, was used to write Rajasthani. The script is also called as Maru Gurjari in a few records.

== Background of Hadauti ==
The Hadauti language is a regional variety of the Rajasthani language spoken by a community in and near the Kota region in Rajasthan, India, and some parts of neighboring Madhya Pradesh. It belongs to the Central-Eastern Rajasthani subgroup of the Indo-Aryan family, as classified by Grierson and Doshi & Purohit. It was included in the Indian Census until 1961, and was classified as one of the mother tongues grouped under Hindi along with Rajasthani language. According to Grierson's Linguistic Survey of India, Hadauti is spoken in the districts of Kota, Baran, Bundi and Jhalawar in Rajasthan, as well as in neighbouring areas of Madhya Pradesh.

== See also ==
- Rajasthani
- Malvi
- Mewari
- Marwari
