= Kota district =

- District of Rajasthan
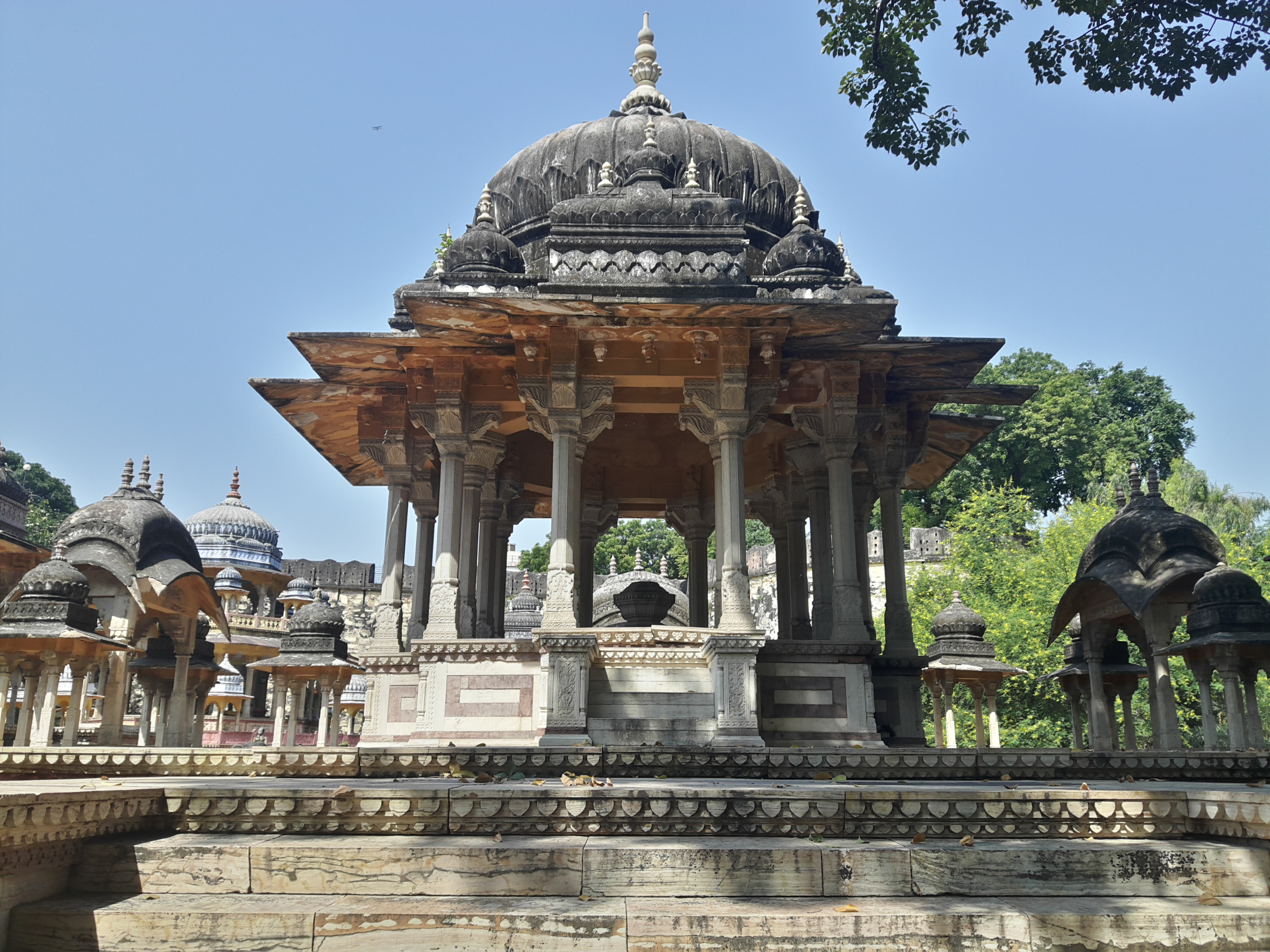
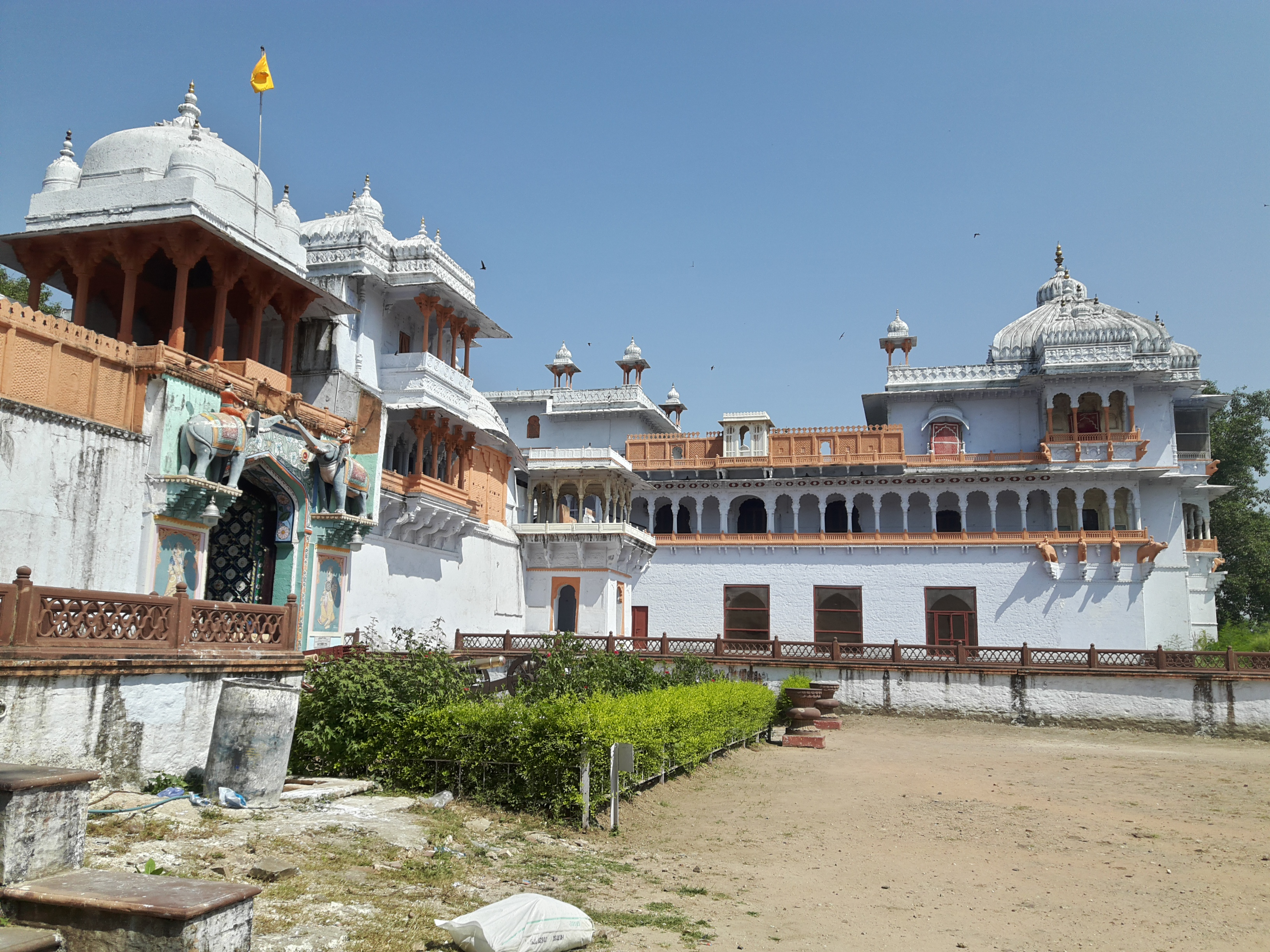
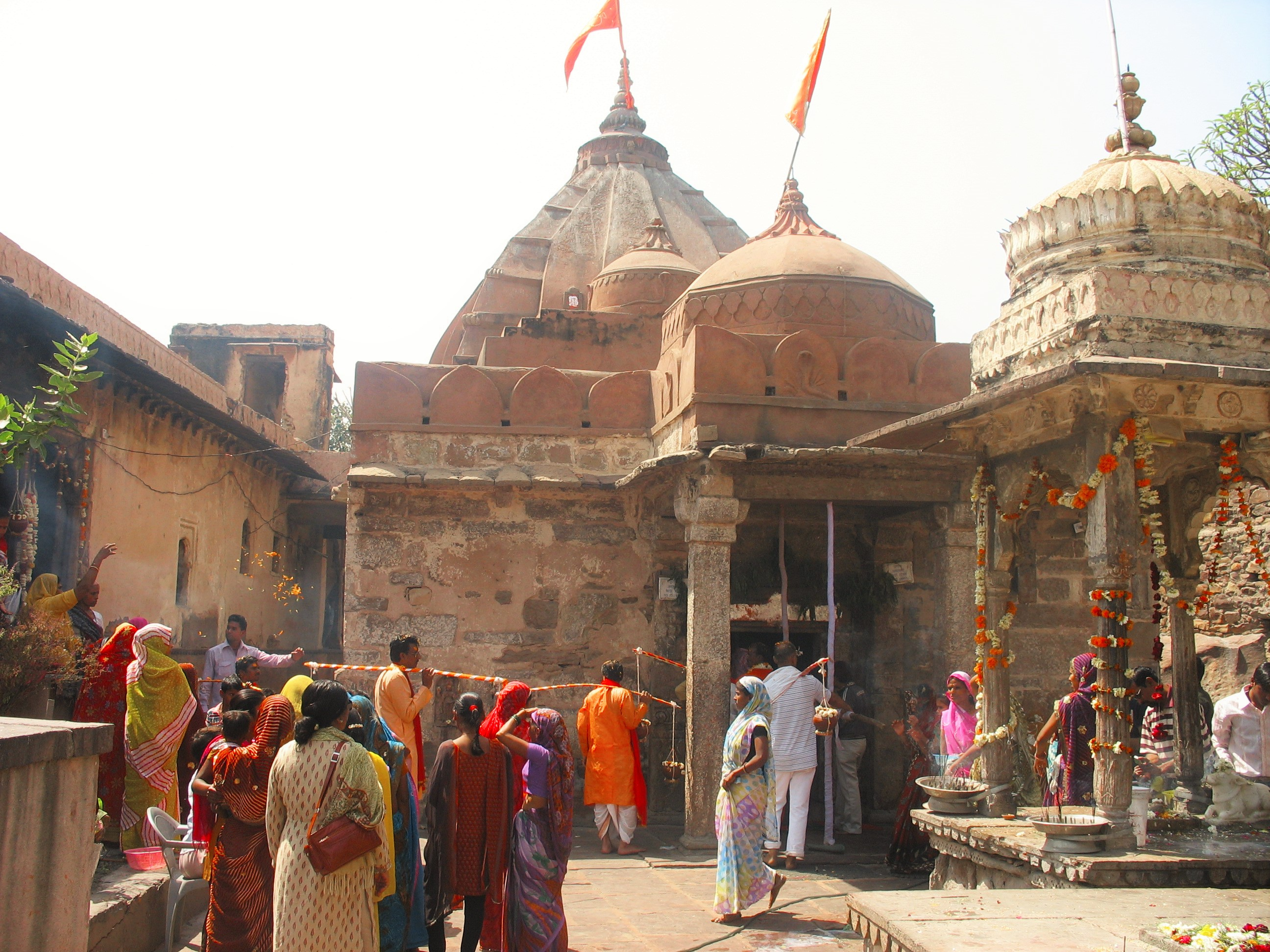
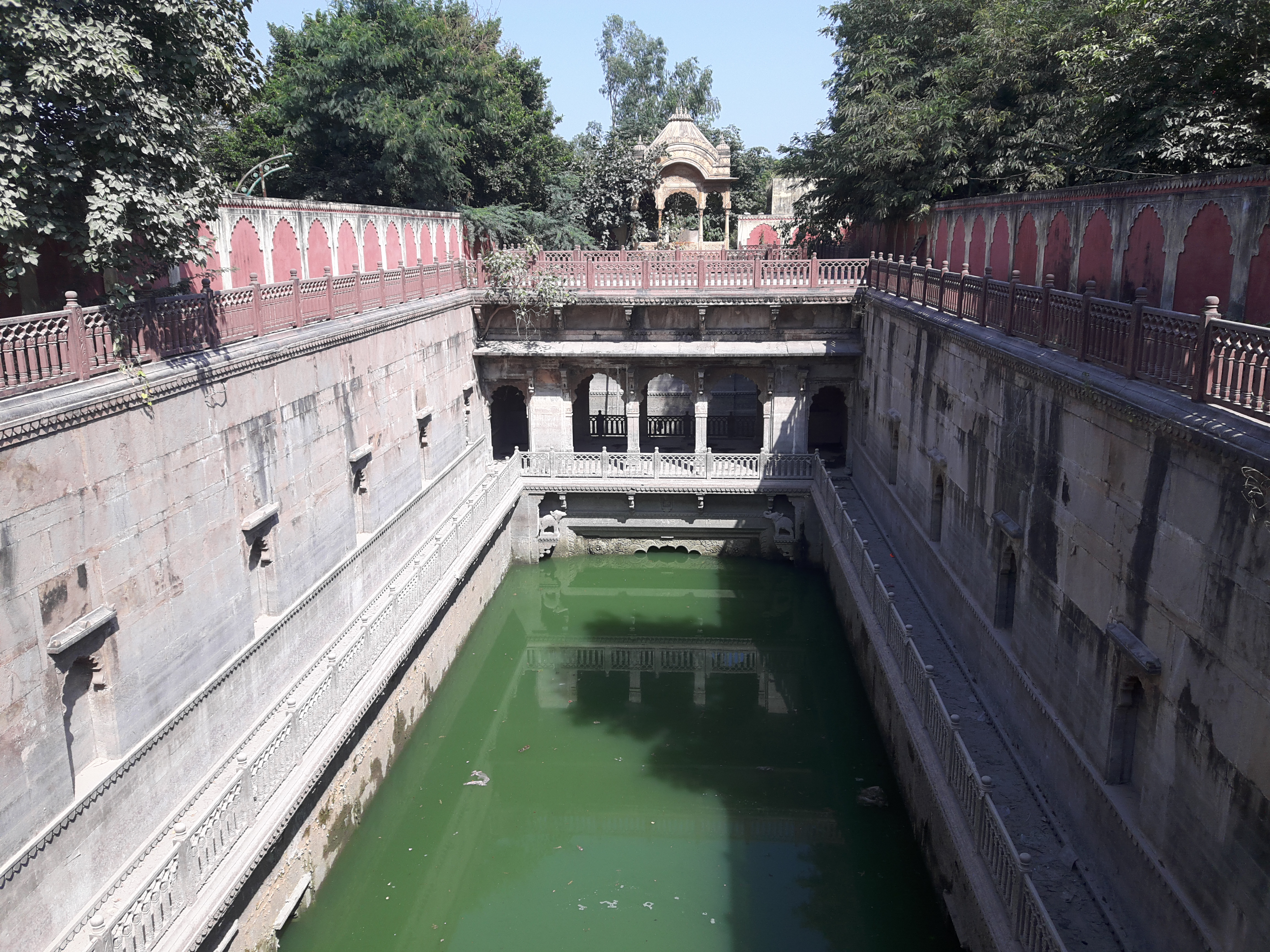
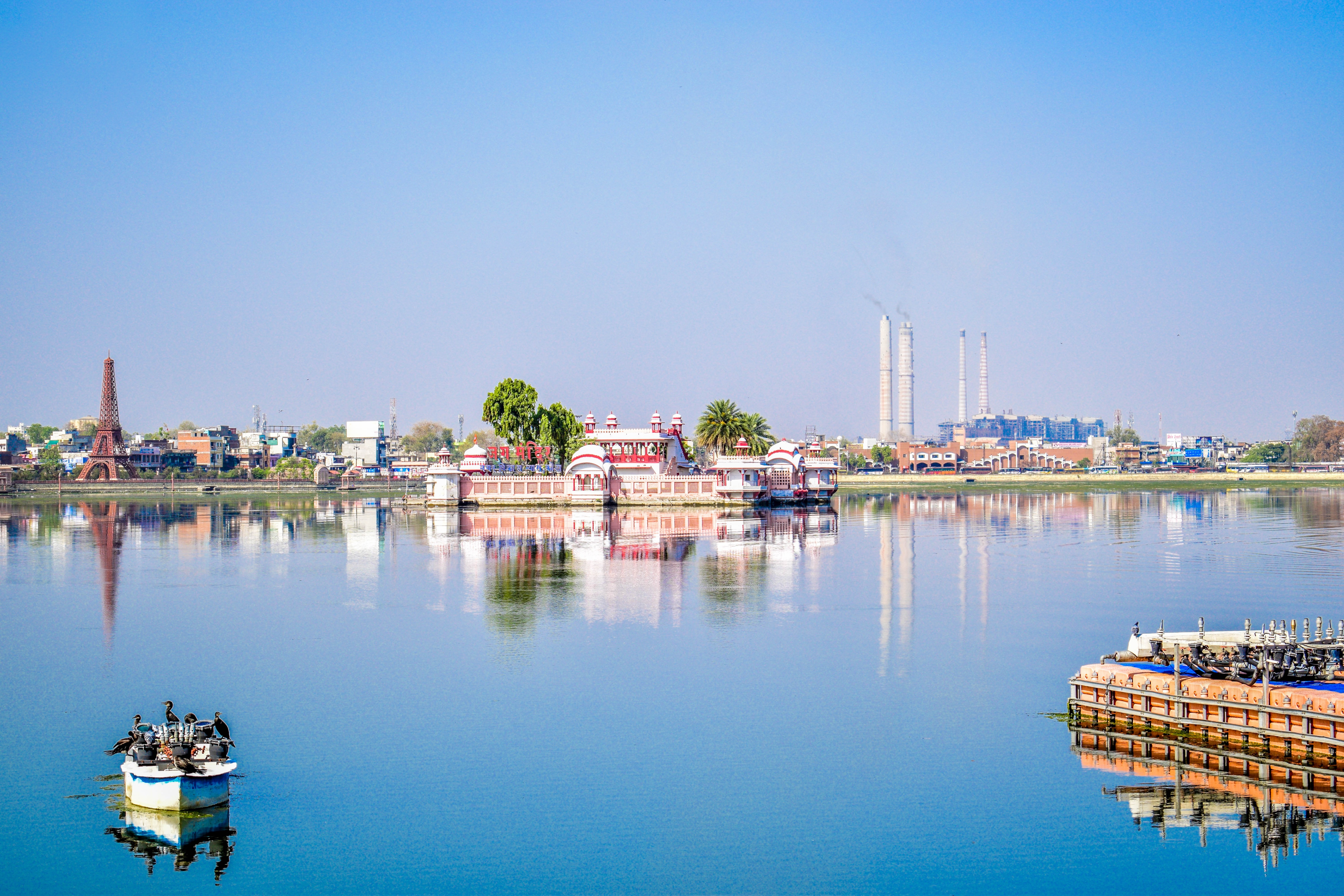
- Clockwise from top-left: Chhar Bag in Kota, Garh Palace, Stepwell in Bawdi, Jag Mandir Sagar, Kansua Shiva Temple

- Location of Kota district in Rajasthan
- Coordinates (Kota, Rajasthan): 25°10′48″N 73°49′48″E
- Country: India
- State: Rajasthan
- Division: Kota
- Headquarters: Kota, Rajasthan

Area
  - Total: 5,217 km^{2} (2,014 sq mi)

Population (2011)
  - Total: 1,951,014
  - Density: 374.0/km^{2} (968.6/sq mi)
  - Urban: 60.31 percent

Demographics
  - Literacy: 76.56
  - Sex ratio: 911
- Time zone: UTC+05:30 (IST)
- Website: kota.rajasthan.gov.in

Kota district is a district of the state of Rajasthan in western India. The city of Kota is the administrative headquarters of the district.

During the period around the 12th century AD, Rao Deva, a Hada Chieftain conquered the territory and founded Bundi and Hadoti. In the early 17th century AD, during the reign of the Mughal Emperor Jahangir, the ruler of Bundi, Rao Ratan Singh, gave the smaller principality of Kota to his son, Madho Singh. Since then, Kota became a hallmark of the Rajput gallantry and culture.

The district is bounded on the north by Bundi District, on the east by Baran District, on the south by Jhalawar District, and on the west by Chittorgarh District and Mandsaur District. It is now the hub of educational institutions and is home to Asia's biggest manufacturer of fertilizer.

Further, Kota is surrounded by four power stations within its 50 km radius. First is Rajasthan atomic power plant, which is an atomic power plant and is very near Kota at a place called Rawatbhata and is situated at a place called Rawatbhata in the Chittorgarh District. Second is the Kota Thermal Power plant, which generates power from coal and is situated at the bank of the Chambal River and is within Kota city. Third is Anta Gas Power plant, which generates power from gas and is situated at a place called Anta in the Baran District. The fourth is Jawahar Sagar Power Plant, which is hydraulic power plant.

== Divisions ==
There are a total of 5 tehsils within Kota District. They are listed as follows:

Tehsil	Population (2011)
Pipalda	179,800
Digod	168,734
Ladpura	1,143,792
Ramganj Mandi	272,448
Sangod	186,240

== Demographics ==
=== Population ===
Historical population
Year	Pop.	±% p.a.
1901	227,837	—
1911	265,002	+1.52%
1921	257,631	−0.28%
1931	276,983	+0.73%
1941	313,464	+1.24%
1951	330,294	+0.52%
1961	434,543	+2.78%
1971	621,295	+3.64%
1981	898,272	+3.76%
1991	1,220,621	+3.11%
2001	1,568,705	+2.54%
2011	1,951,014	+2.20%

According to the 2011 census Kota district has a population of 1,951,014, roughly equal to the nation of Lesotho or the US state of New Mexico. This gives it a ranking of 239th in India (out of a total of 640). The district has a population density of 374 inhabitants per square kilometre (970/sq mi) . Its population growth rate over the decade 2001-2011 was 24.35%. Kota has a sex ratio of 906 females for every 1000 males, and a literacy rate of 77.48%. 60.31% of the population lives in urban areas. Scheduled Castes and Scheduled Tribes make up 20.78% and 9.42% of the population respectively.

=== Religion ===
Religions in Kota district (2011)
Religion	Percent
Hinduism	85.15%
Islam	12.51%
Jainism	1.32%
Sikhism	0.57%
Other or not stated	0.45%

=== Languages ===
Languages of Kota district (2011)
1. Harauti (48.3%)
2. Hindi (39.4%)
3. Rajasthani (3.58%)
4. Malvi (2.26%)
5. Urdu (1.94%)
6. Sindhi (1.12%)
7. Others (3.36%)

At the time of the 2011 census, 48.32% of the population spoke Hadauti, 39.42% Hindi, 3.58% Rajasthani, 2.26% Malvi, 1.94% Urdu and 1.12% Sindhi as their first language.

== Newspapers ==
- Dainik Bhaskar
- Rajasthan Patrika

== See also ==
- Keshavpura
- Panahera
- Ramganj Mandi
- Kota Stone Industry
