= Bundi district =

Coordinates: 25.4417°N 75.6417°E

- District of Rajasthan
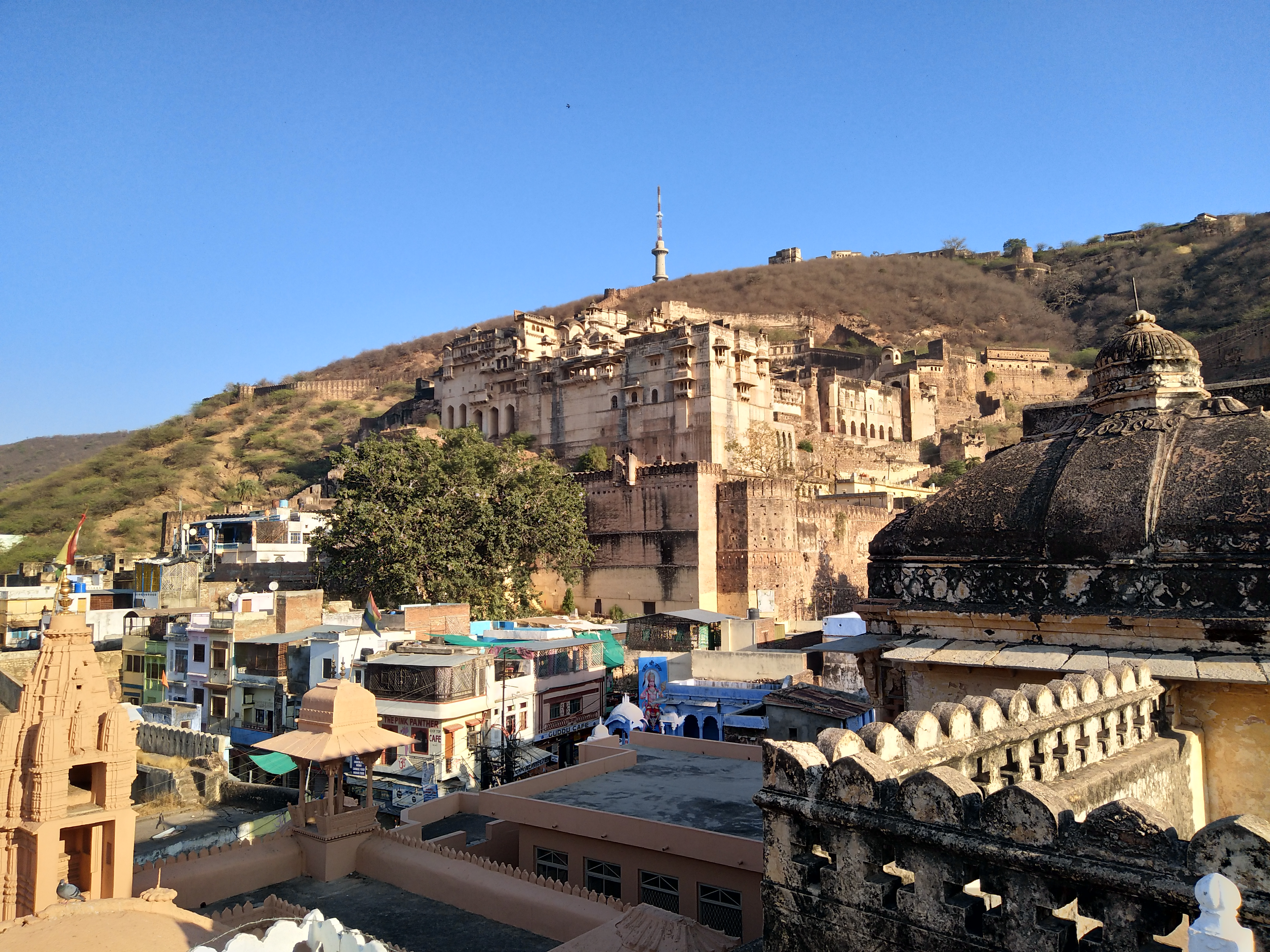
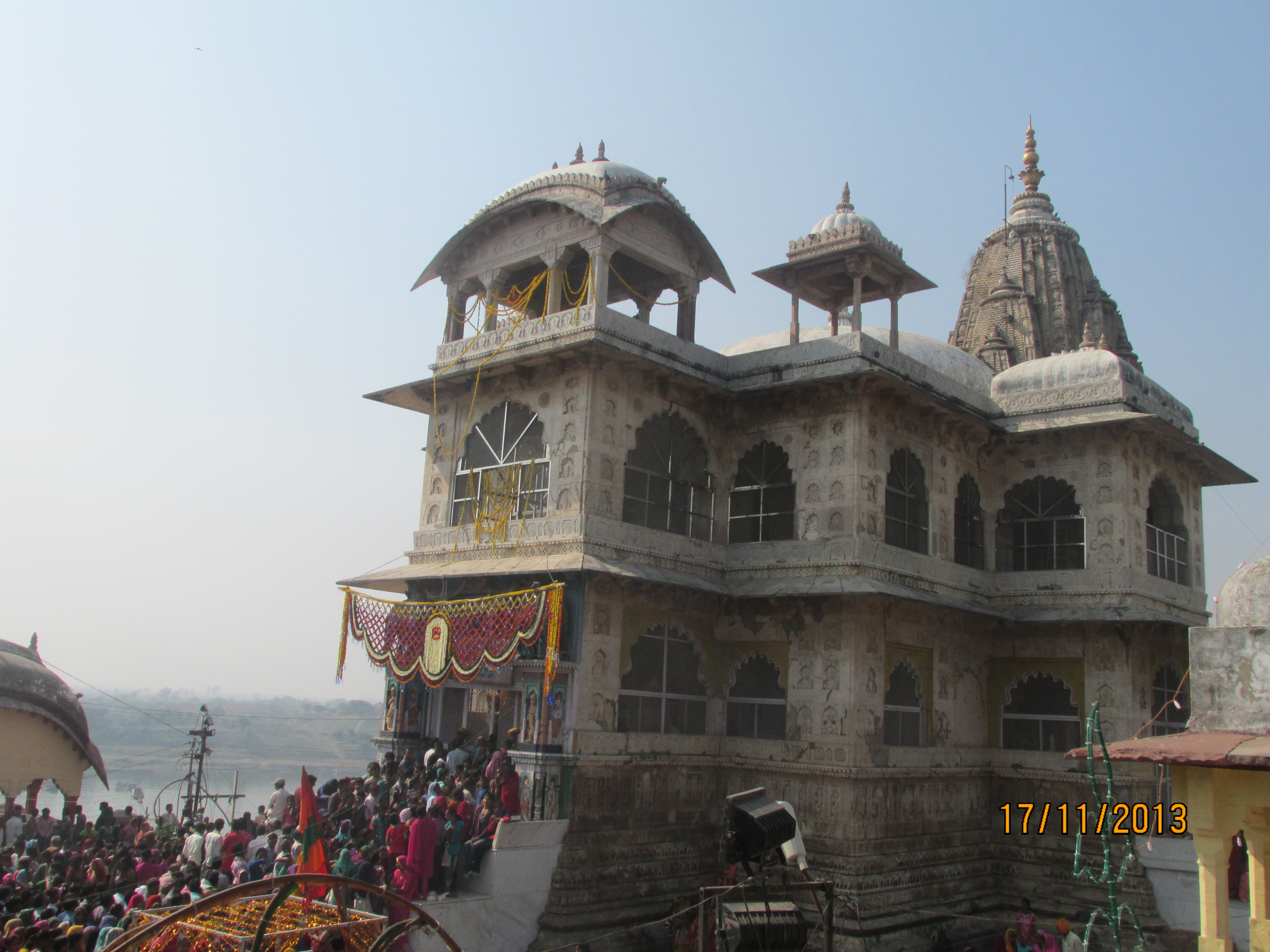
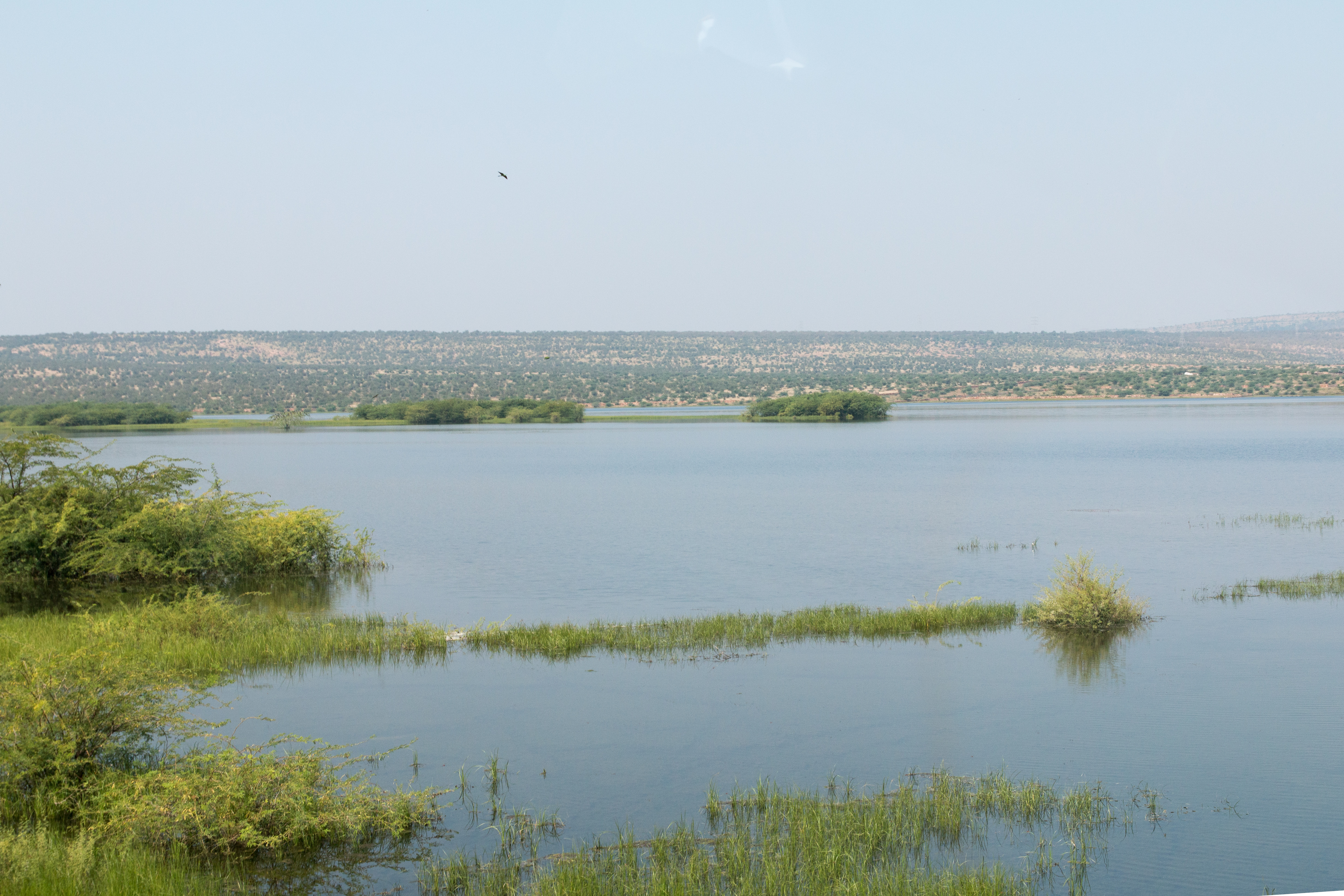
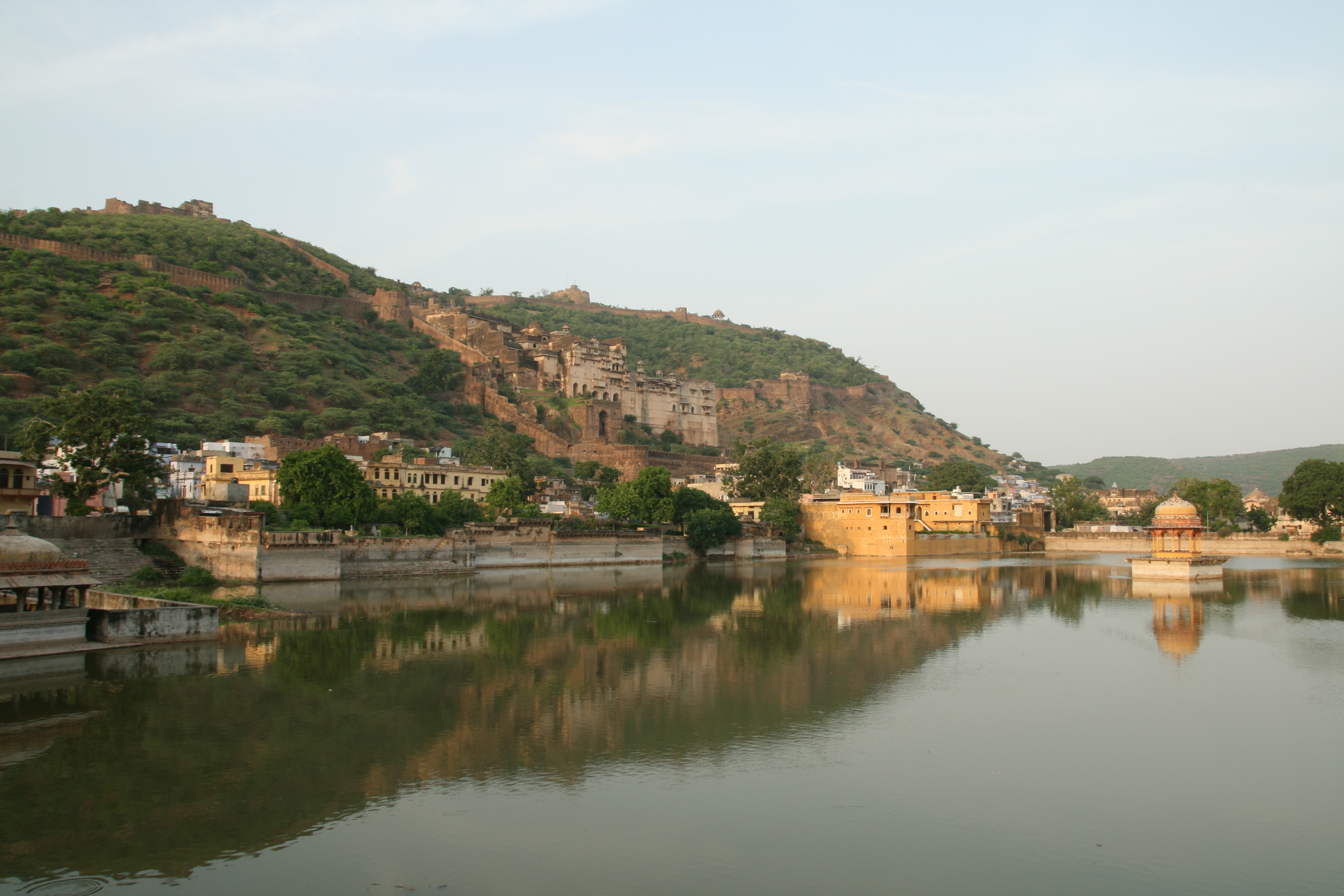
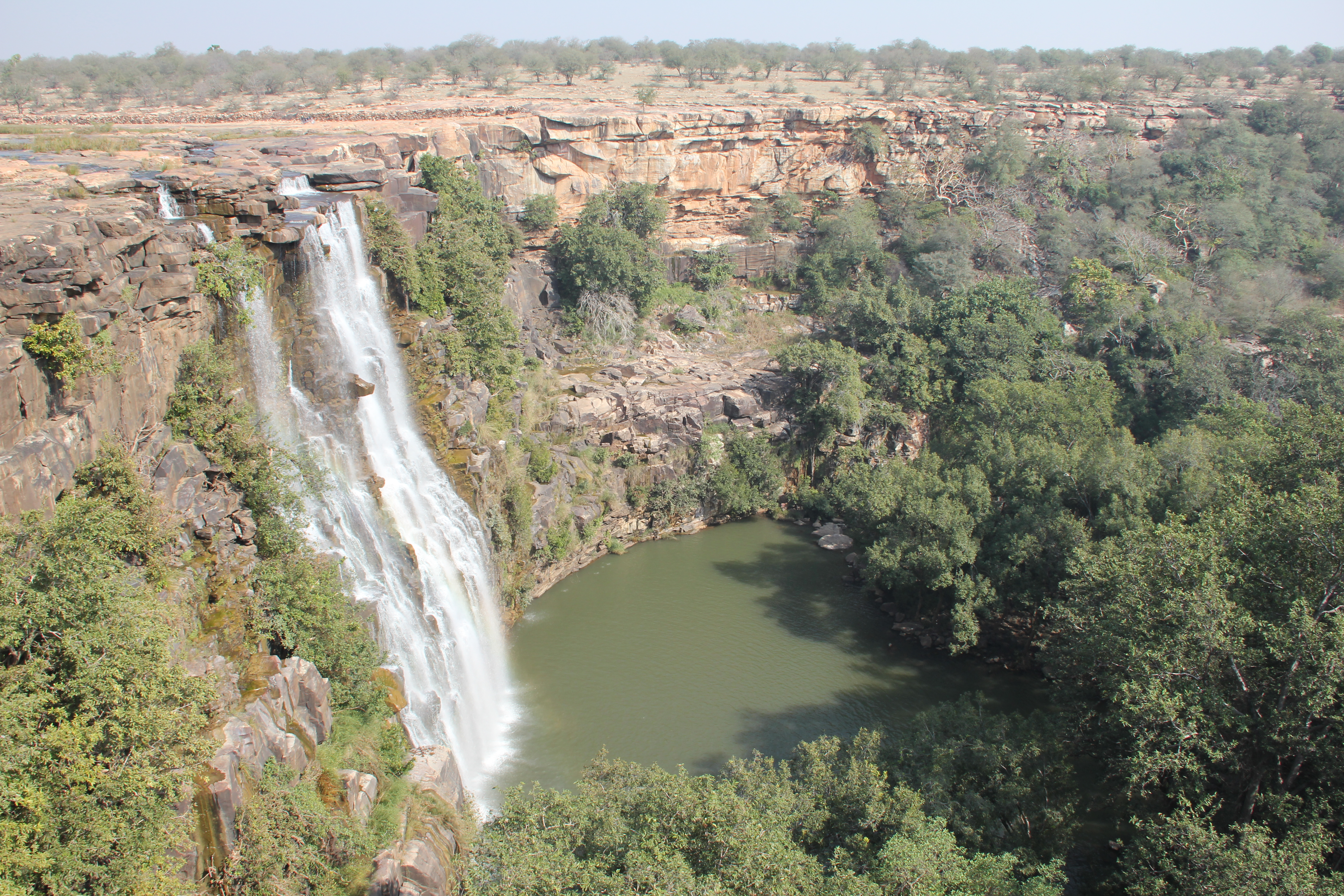
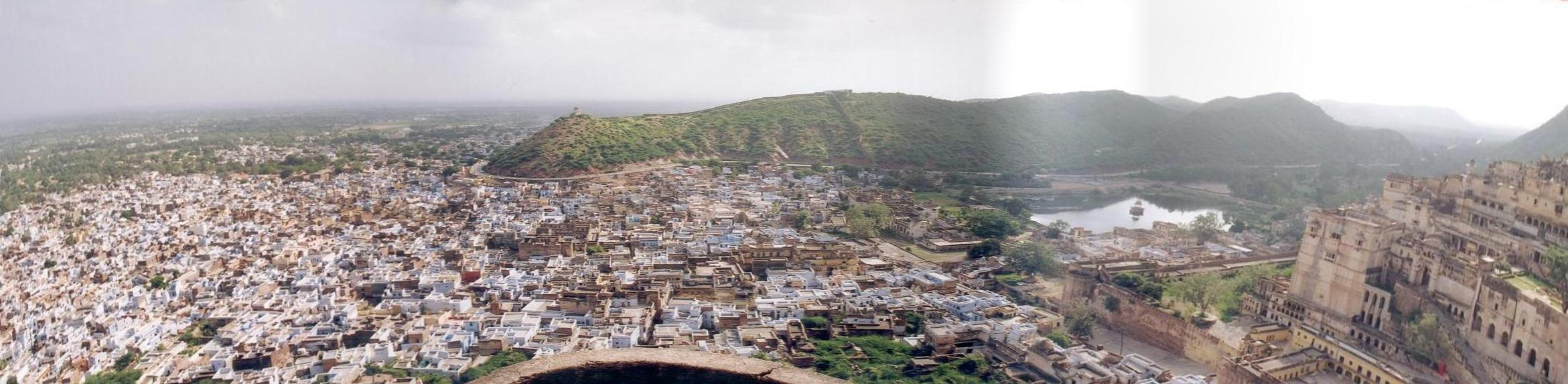
- Garh Palace in Bundi Keshavrai Temple in Keshoraipatan Naval Sagar Lake Bundi Waterfall in Bundi district Panoramic view of the old town and palace of Bundi.

- Location of Bundi district in Rajasthan
- Country: India
- State: Rajasthan
- Division: Kota

Government
  - District Collector & Magistrate: Akshay Godara, IAS
  - Superintendent of Police: Hanuman Prasad Meena, IPS

Area
  - Total: 5,550 km^{2} (2,140 sq mi)

Population (2011)
  - Total: 1,110,906
  - Density: 200/km^{2} (518/sq mi)

Languages
  - Official: Hindi
  - Native: Hadauti (Rajasthani)
- Time zone: UTC+5:30 (IST)
- PIN: 323001
- Telephone code: 0747
- ISO 3166 code: RJ-IN
- Vehicle registration: RJ-08
- Website: Bundi District

Bundi district is a district in the state of Rajasthan in western India. The city of Bundi is the district headquarters. It has an area of 5,550 km^{2} and a population of 1,110,906 (2011 census). It is divided into 5 tehsils which are: Bundi, Hindoli, Nainwa, Keshoraipatan and Indergarh.

== Geography ==
Bundi district is located in southeastern Rajasthan, in the region of Hadoti. It borders Tonk district to the north, Bhilwara district to the west, Chittorgarh district to the southwest, and Kota district to the east. The Chambal River marks the southeastern border dividing Bundi and Kota districts.

A double range of hills (parallel and close together) crosses Bundi district from northeast to southwest, dividing the district into two almost equal parts. The southern face of this range is a steep escarpment which makes crossing difficult. There are four passes through the hills. One of them is at the city of Bundi, and the road from Deoli to Kota passes through here. Another is immediately to the east, at Jainiwas; a direct road to Tonk passes through here. The third pass, between Khatgarh and Ramgarh, is a gorge cut by the Mez river. The fourth pass is near the town of Lakheri.

The plains northwest of the hills are drier, and their soil is relatively hard and stony. The southeastern plains have a wetter climate and more fertile soil, including rich alluvial soil along various streams and fertile, sandy loam in various other places.

== History ==
Stone Age tools dating around 5,000 to 200,000 years before present, were found in Bundi and Bhilwara districts of the state. South-east Region of Rajasthan is known as Hadoti - the land of the Hada Rajputs. Hadas are a major branch of the Chauhan Agnikula Rajputs (hailing from fire dynasty). They had settled in the hilly terrain of Mewar, at Bambaoda, near Bijoliya in the 12th century CE. Bundi was established in 1241 CE by Rao Deva Singh. This was the first step in the establishment of Hadauti, when the Hadas moved down from the ‘Pathar’ around Bambaoda. Bundi takes its name from the Bando Naal or the narrow passage, between the rugged hills. The town of Bundi is nestled in the cleft of the Aravalli Range and has a special medieval flavor quite untouched by time. Prince Jait Singh of Bundi captured Kota in 1264 AD and Kota became a part of Bundi as the Jaghir (land grant) of the eldest prince of Bundi. Kota became a separate state in 1624. The state of Jhalawar was formed in 1838 out of Kota territory.

=== Administrative changes ===
Bundi district's territory today is almost identical to the territory of the princely state at the time it joined India in 1948. However, in 1949, when the Rajasthan Union was reformed into Greater Rajasthan, 30 villages were transferred from Bundi to Tonk, while 7 villages (from Thikana Antarda) were transferred from Kota to Bundi.

== Demographics ==
Historical population
Year	Pop.	±% p.a.
1901	179,256	—
1911	228,068	+2.44%
1921	196,146	−1.50%
1931	226,482	+1.45%
1941	260,420	+1.41%
1951	292,157	+1.16%
1961	353,267	+1.92%
1971	467,793	+2.85%
1981	612,017	+2.72%
1991	770,248	+2.33%
2001	962,620	+2.25%
2011	1,110,906	+1.44%

Religions in Bundi district (2011)
Religion	Percent
Hinduism	91.61%
Islam	6.00%
Jainism	1.21%
Sikhism	1.00%
Others	0.18%

According to the 2011 census Bundi district has a population of 1,110,906, roughly equal to the nation of Cyprus or the US state of Rhode Island. This gives it a ranking of 415th in India (out of a total of 640). The district has a population density of 193 inhabitants per square kilometre (500/sq mi) . Its population growth rate over the decade 2001-2011 was 15.7%. Bundi has a sex ratio of 922 females for every 1000 males, and a literacy rate of 62.31%. 20.05% of the population lives in urban areas. Scheduled Castes and Scheduled Tribes make up 18.97% and 20.57% of the population respectively.

=== Languages ===
Languages of Bundi district (2011)
1. Hadauti (76.0%)
2. Hindi (14.3%)
3. Rajasthani (4.67%)
4. Malvi (1.01%)
5. Others (3.95%)

At the time of the 2011 census, 76.02% of the population spoke Hadauti, 14.35% Hindi, 4.67% Rajasthani and 1.01% Malvi as their first language.

== See also ==
- Bardha Dam
- Bhimlat Mahadev Temple
- Bundi TV Tower
- Government Senior Secondary School, Bundi
- Hadoti
- Jait Sagar Lake
- Pholai
- Taragarh Fort, Bundi
