= Bhupesh Singh =

Brigadier Bhupesh Singh Hada SC VSM
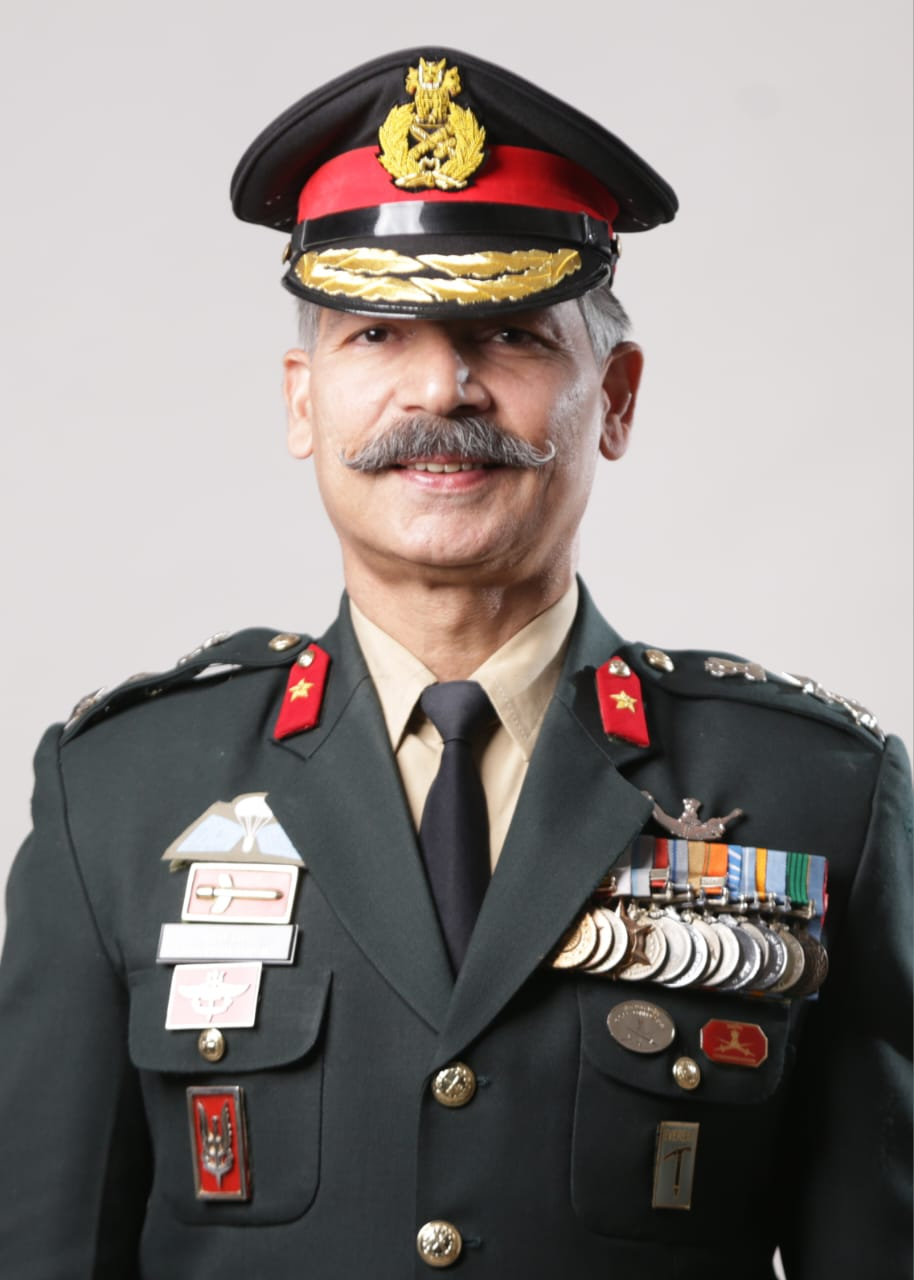
- Brig Bhupesh Singh Hada
- Born: June 30, 1970 (age 56); Bundi, Rajasthan, India
- Military career
- Allegiance: India
- Branch: Indian Army
- Service years: 1991–2024
- Rank: Brigadier
- Service number: IC-50798
- Units: Madras Regiment; 10 Para (Special Forces); Mechanised Infantry Regiment; Special Frontier Force (SFF); National Security Guard (NSG)
- Commands: 102 Infantry Brigade (Siachen Brigade)
- Conflicts: Operation Rhino; Operation Orchid; Operation Rakshak; Operation Vijay; Operation Parakram; Operation Falcon; Operation Meghdoot; UNMEE (Peacekeeping)
- Awards: Shaurya Chakra; Vishisht Seva Medal

Brigadier Maharao Raja Bhupesh Singh Hada of Bundi, SC, VSM (born June 1970) is an Indian Army officer and the 26th titular King of Bundi. A Special Forces officer, he has served as Force Commander of the National Security Guards and Commander of the Siachen Brigade. He was installed as the ceremonial king of the erstwhile Princely State of Bundi on 12 December 2021, continuing the lineage as the 26th Gaadipati of the Hada Chauhan dynasty of Bundi.

== Early life and education ==
Hada was born in Bundi, Rajasthan, to Maharaja Vijayraj Singh, an educationist and social worker. He belongs to the erstwhile Jaagir of Maalakpura and Chautra Ka Kheda. He completed his schooling from Sainik School, Chittorgarh, and graduated from the National Defence Academy (79th Course, Golf Squadron). He subsequently trained at the Indian Military Academy before being commissioned in 1991.

== Military career ==
Hada was commissioned into the 11th Battalion of the Madras Regiment on 14 December 1991. After three years, he volunteered for the Special Forces and was inducted into the elite 10 Para (Special Forces) known as 'Scorpions'.

Over the course of his three-decade career, he served across multiple branches, including the Mechanised Infantry, the 10th Battalion, Parachute Regiment (Special Forces), and the Special Frontier Force (SFF). He also played an instrumental role in the raising of an Independent Infantry Brigade deployed along the Indo-Tibetan border.

During his service, Hada participated in numerous major military and counter-terrorism operations, including Operation Rhino, Operation Orchid, Operation Rakshak, Operation Vijay (Kargil War), Operation Parakram, Operation Falcon, and Operation Meghdoot. He trained extensively alongside the Indian Air Force, the Indian Navy, various Central Armed Police Forces (CAPF), and the militaries of friendly foreign nations. In July and August 1998, he participated in counter-terrorism operations in the Kashmir Valley. For his leadership and actions during these operations, which resulted in the elimination of multiple militants, he was awarded the Shaurya Chakra, India's third-highest peacetime gallantry award.

In 2003, Hada was selected for a United Nations peacekeeping assignment, serving as a Team Leader and Senior Sector Military Observer for the United Nations Mission in Ethiopia and Eritrea (UNMEE).

Hada held several notable command and staff appointments. While commanding the Siachen Brigade for which he was awarded Vishisht Seva Medal, he oversaw the implementation of the Artificial Glacier Water Supply Scheme (AGWSS) to address water storage and supply challenges for troops stationed at altitudes between 18,000 and 22,000 feet on the Siachen Glacier. Inspired by the artificial glacier concepts developed by Sonam Wangchuk, Hada tasked his team with adapting the technology to sustain military personnel in the high-altitude environment.

After successfully commanding the Siachen Brigade for which he was awarded Vishisht Seva Medal, Hada served as the Deputy General Officer Commanding (Dy GOC) and Station Commander of the Jodhpur Sub Area. He subsequently served as a Deputy Inspector General (DIG) at the National Security Guard (NSG), where he spearheaded Force One from 2020 to 2022. He has also served in numerous headquarters and training institutions.

An active mountaineer and participant in ultra-marathons Hada served as the Deputy Commandant and Chief Instructor at the High Altitude Warfare School (HAWS) in Gulmarg. He also conceptualized, planned, and led a major expedition to Mount Everest and Mount Lhotse in 2012. He successfully summited Mount Everest on 25 May 2012, raising the flag of his regiment and the historical flag of the Bundi state at the peak. He retired from active military service with the rank of Brigadier in December 2024.

== Awards and decorations ==

Shaurya Chakra		Vishisht Seva Medal	
Wound Medal	Special Service Medal		Operation Vijay Star
Siachen Glacier Medal	Operation Vijay Medal	Operation Parakram Medal	Sainya Seva Medal
High Altitude Service Medal	Videsh Seva Medal	75th Independence Anniversary Medal	50th Independence Anniversary Medal
30 Years Long Service Medal	20 Years Long Service Medal	9 Years Long Service Medal	UNMEE Medal

During his 33-year military career, Hada received the following major decorations:

- Shaurya Chakra (1999): Awarded for gallantry during relentless anti-terrorist operations in Northern Kashmir under Operation Rakshak.
- Vishisht Seva Medal (2019): Awarded for commendable work and distinguished service while commanding the Siachen Brigade during Operation Meghdoot.
- Wound Medal: Awarded for sustaining bullet injuries during a combat mission under Operation Rakshak.
- Chief of Army Staff Commendation (1997, 2013): In 1997 for anti-terrorist operations in Jammu and Kashmir (Operation Rakshak), and again in 2013 for his contributions to adventure activities.
- Army Commander's Commendation (1993): Awarded for anti-terrorist operations in Assam during Operation Rhino.
- UN Force Commander's Appreciation (2003): Awarded for distinguished services during the peacekeeping mission in Ethiopia and Eritrea (UNMEE)
- Director General NSG's Roll & Disc (2021): Awarded for commendable work during his tenure with the National Security Guard.

== Royal succession ==
Following the death of the 25th Maharao Raja Ranjit Singh in 2010 without a named heir, the titular headship of the Hada Rajputs of Bundi remained vacant for over a decade. On 12 December 2021, a local faction known as the Paag (turban) committee, with the backing of 108 of the 118 former jagirdars and thikanedars of the region, crowned Brigadier Hada as the 26th Maharao Raja in a ceremony at the Raktdantika Mateshwari Temple in Sathoor. Bundi was a Princely State founded by the Hada Chauhans in 1242 CE and was the capital of the Hadauti region. The rulers are descendants of Samrat Prithviraj Chauhan, and the Bundi throne is considered as the senior-most continuous 'Gaddi' of Chauhan Rajputs.

In March 2024, the dispute escalated locally when Hada and his supporters attempted to open the gates of the Taragarh Fort and other properties to the general public. This led to a confrontation with the opposing faction, resulting in the brief preventive detainment of Hada and three associates by the local police to maintain public order.

== Personal life ==
Brigadier Bhupesh is married to Padmaja Rathore from Jasol, Barmer. They have a son named Raghav Hada. As the titular King of erstwhile Princely State of Bundi and as Gaadipati of Hada-Chauhan Raajvansh, he serves as the ceremonial head of the Kshatriya community in the region and chairs the Hadauti Foundation, which manages Bundi's royal heritage.
