= Ranjit Singh of Bundi =

Maharao Raja of Bundi (1977–2010)

Ranjit Singh
- Maharao Raja

Maharao Raja of Bundi
- Reign: 24 December 1977 – 8 January 2010
- Predecessor: Bahadur Singh
- Successor: Vanshvardhan Singh
- Born: 13 September 1939
- Died: 8 January 2010 (aged 70)
- Spouse: Durga Kumari (m. 1969; div. 1971)
- House: Bundi
- Dynasty: Hada
- Father: Bahadur Singh

Ranjit Singh (13 September 1939 – 8 January 2010) was the head of the Hada clan of the Chauhan Rajputs and the Maharao Raja of State of Bundi from 1977 until his death in 2010.

== Biography ==
He was born on 13 September 1939 to Bahadur Singh, the Maharao Raja of Bundi, and his wife, who was a daughter of Sajjan Singh, the Maharaja of Ratlam. He married on 11 December 1969 to Durga Kumari, a daughter of Lakshman Singh, the Raja of Chamba, by his wife Devendra Kumari from Pratapgarh. The two divorced in 1971. He had a younger sister named Mahendra Kumari. Upon the death of his father on 24 December 1977, he succeeded him to the title, rank and dignity of the Maharao Raja of Bundi. Traditionally, the head of the royal house of Bundi is also acknowledged as the head of Hadas.

He died after a prolonged illness in New Delhi on 8 January 2010. As he left behind no male issues to succeed him, the throne of Bundi remained vacant until 2 April 2022, when Vanshvardhan Singh was installed as his successor.

== Titles and styles ==
Upon his accession to the throne of Bundi, he was titled His Highness Hadendra Shiromani Deo Sar Buland Rai Maharao Raja Ranjit Singh Bahadur, like his predecessors.
