= Bahadur Singh of Bundi =

Maharao Raja of Bundi (1945–1949)

Bahadur Singh
- Maharao Raja

Maharao Raja of Bundi
- Reign: 23 April 1945 – 24 December 1977
- Predecessor: Ishwari Singh
- Successor: Ranjit Singh
- Born: 16 March 1920
- Died: 24 December 1977 (aged 57); Broadlands, Romsey, Hampshire, England
- Issue: Ranjit Singh; Mahendra Kumari
- Father: Ishwari Singh (adoptive); Dhanurdhar Singh (biological)
- Education: Mayo College
- Military career
- Allegiance: British India
- Branch: British Indian Army
- Rank: Colonel
- Unit: Probyn's Horse
- Battles/wars: World War II; Burma campaign; Battle of Meiktila
- Awards: Military Cross

Bahadur Singh MC (17 March 1920 – 24 December 1977) was the head of the Hada clan of the Chauhan Rajputs and the Maharao Raja of State of Bundi from 1945 until his death in 1977.

== Early life, family, and education ==
He was born on 16 March 1920 to Dhanurdhar Singh of Kapren. He was adopted by Ishwari Singh, the Maharao Raja of Bundi, in 1933. He received his education at Mayo College, Ajmer. He received his education at Mayo College at Ajmer. Then, in 1940, he underwent administrative training at Police Training College at Moradabad, following which, in 1941, he undertook I.C.S. Probationers Course at Dehradun. He married in 1938 to a daughter of Sajjan Singh, the Maharaja of Ratlam, and had two children with her: a son, Ranjit Singh, and a daughter, Mahendra Kumari.

He was elected as member of the standing committee of the Chamber of Princes in 1943.

== Military career ==
He entered the Indian Army in 1942 and was posted to the Officers Training School at Bangalore. He was commissioned in Probyn’s Horse, with which he served in the Burma campaign during World War II. He was wounded on 2 March 1945 and was mentioned in dispatches. For his gallantry during attack on Meiktila he was awarded the Military Cross in April 1945.

== Reign ==
When, on 23 April 1945, his adoptive father died, he succeeded him as the Maharao Raja of Bundi. He was at the time serving in Burma and was news of Ishwari Singh death was heard by his regiment he was sent back to Bundi. He in 1946 introduced a constitution for his state. By this constitution, he guaranteed fundamental rights to his subjects, including that of due process, habeas corpus, and freedoms of expression, association, assembly, conscience, and religion. He also guaranteed them equality before the law and prohibited discrimination based on religion or caste in public employment and trades. When it was decided that India would be partitioned and British paramountcy over princely states would soon lapse, the princely states were given the option to accede to either the Dominion of India or the Dominion of Pakistan, or to remain independent. He signed an instrument of accession in August 1947, and through it he acceded his state to the Dominion of India. In 1948, he signed a covenant with the Government of India by which Bundi was merged into Rajasthan Union. On 19 September 1970, the President of India, by a special order, using the powers vested in him through article 366(22) by the Constitution of India, derecognised him.

== Death ==
He died on 24 December 1977 at Broadlands in England. There, he was visiting Lord Mountbatten. His son Ranjit Singh succeeded to his title, rank, and dignity.

== Titles and styles ==
Before his adoption into Bundi family, he was styled Rajkumar Bahadur Singh of Kapren. Following his adoption, he was styled as Maharajkumar Bahadur Singh of Bundi. Upon his accession, he was titled His Highness Hadendra Shiromani Deo Sar Buland Rai Maharao Raja Bahadur Singh Bahadur, the Maharao Raja of Bundi..
