= Ram Singh Bundi =

Raja of Bundi from 1821 to 1889

HH Maharao Sir Ram Singh
- Maharao Raja
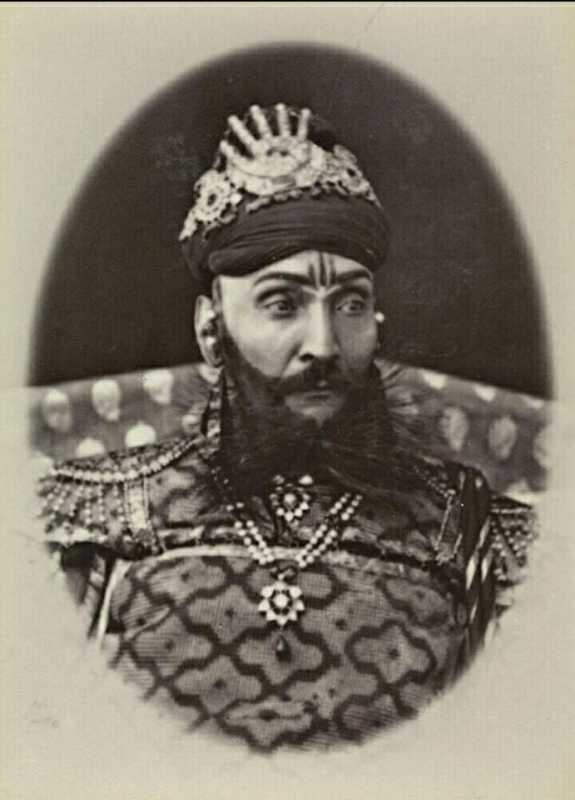
- Photo taken of the Raja in the late 19th century

Maharao Raja of Bundi
- Reign: 14 May 1821 – 28 March 1889
- Coronation: 5 August 1821
- Predecessor: Maharao Bishan Singh
- Successor: Raja Raghubir Singh
- Born: 1811; Bundi, Bundi State
- Died: 28 March 1889 (aged 77–78); Bundi, Bundi State, British Raj
- Burial: 28 March 1889
- Spouse: Maharaniji Rathorji Swarup Kanwarji of Jodhpur-Marwar; Maharaniji Shekhawatji Gulab Kanwarji of Bissau; Maharaniji Pariharji Chandrabhan Kanwarji of Nagod State; Maharaniji Pariharji Shubnath Kanwarji of Pataura
- Issue: See below
- House: Bundi Royal Family
- Father: Maharao Bishan Singh
- Mother: Maharaniji Rathorji Aman Kanwarji d.of Raja Pratap Singh of Kishangarh
- Religion: Hinduism

HH Hatendra Shiromani Deo Sar Buland Rai Maharajadhiraj Maharao Raja Shri Sir Ram Singh of Bundi GCSI (1811 – 28 March 1889) was the 25th Hada Chauhan ruler of the Princely State of Bundi in the south-eastern region of Hadoti in Rajputana (now Rajasthan) and the first to rule within the imperial British Raj.

He succeeded his father Maharao Bishan Singh and was succeeded by his eldest son Raja Raghubir Singh, reigning between 1821 and 1889.

== Reign ==
Ram Singh was born in 1811 as the eldest son of Raja Bishen Singh. The following year Ram Singh had a brother, Gopal Singh in 1812. He was a disciple of Satguru Balak Singh. He succeeded his Father following after he died at the age of 48 on 14 May 1821 and was later installed on 5 August 1821 at the age of just 10. The Raja mostly experienced a rather peaceful and beloved reign during his nearly 70-year tenure (which was the longest reign in Rajasthani history) for much of his rule. During the Indian Rebellion of 1857, the Raja lacked much enthusiasm and interest in the conflict, providing lukewarm amounts of support, but was still considered very supportive of the British. He experienced the establishment of the British Raj in 1858. He was a notable friend of Raja Ram Singh II of Kota. Eventually he was granted a Sanad in 1862 at the age of 51 and became a well-respected figure within the British Raj. According to many contemporary sources, he was considered as a remarkable and popular ruler and was shown with the strict integrity he evinced in all his actions. He was granted the GCSI honour in 1877 after reigned for over 55 years. He died at the age of 77 on 28 March 1889 and was succeeded by his eldest son Raja Raghubir Singh after an extremely long and progressive rule.

== Issue ==
The ruler married thrice and was the father of six children in total.

- Yuvraj Bhim Singh
- Raja Raghubir Singh
- Kunwar Rangraj Singh
- Kunwar Raghuraj Singh
- Kunwar Raghunath Singh
- Kunwar Rangnath Singh
- Kunwari Lakshman Kanwarji m.to Maharaja Sir Sardar Singh of Jodhpur Marwar

== See also ==
- List of longest-reigning monarchs
- Bundi State
