= Ishwari Singh =

Ruler of Bundi from 1927–1945

- Maharao Raja

Maharao Raja of Bundi
- Reign: 8 August 1927 – 23 April 1945
- Predecessor: Raghubir Singh
- Successor: Bahadur Singh
- Born: 8 March 1893
- Died: 23 April 1945 (aged 52)
- Issue: Bahadur Singh; Kesri Singh
- House: Bundi
- Dynasty: Hada
- Father: Raghuraj Singh
- Mother: Suraj Kanwar

Sir Ishwari Singh GCIE (8 March 1893 – 23 April 1945) was the 27th ruler of the princely state of Bundi from 1927 until his death in 1945.

== Early life, education, and family ==
Singh was born on 8 March 1893 to Raghuraj Singh and his wife Suraj Kanwar. His father was a son of Ram Singh of Bundi. His mother was a daughter of Zorawar Singh of Raoti and a granddaughter of Takht Singh II of Jodhpur. He was educated privately. He married two daughters of Lal Radha Keshwar Prasad Singh, the Thakur of Durjanpur, in Baghelkhand. Since he had no issue of his own, he adopted Bahadur Singh and Kesri Singh, the sons of Dhanurdhar Singh of Kapren.

== Reign ==
Upon the death of his uncle Raghubir Singh on 26 July 1927, the throne of Bundi became vacant. He ascended the vacant throne as the Maharao Raja on 8 August 1927. By doing which, he also became the head of the Hada clan of the Chauhan family of Rajputs. He was invested with full administrative powers on 26 September 1927. During his reign, many fine buildings and roads were built in the state.

== Death ==
He died on 23 April 1945 and was succeeded by Bahadur Singh to his rank, title, and dignity.

== Titles, styles and honours ==
=== Titles and styles ===
Upon his accession to the throne, he was titled His Highness Hadendra Shiromani Deo Sar Buland Rai Maharajadhiraj Maharao Raja Ishwari Singh Bahadur, the Maharao Raja of Bundi.

=== Honours ===
He was appointed a Knight Grand Commander of the Order of the Indian Empire by George VI on 11 May 1937 to mark his coronation. Being the ruler of Bundi, he ranked fourth in the order of precedence amongst the rulers of Rajputana and was entitled to a salute of 17 guns.
