= Siege of Ranthambore (1568) =

Part of the Mughal-Rajput Wars

- Part of Mughal-Rajput War 1558–1578
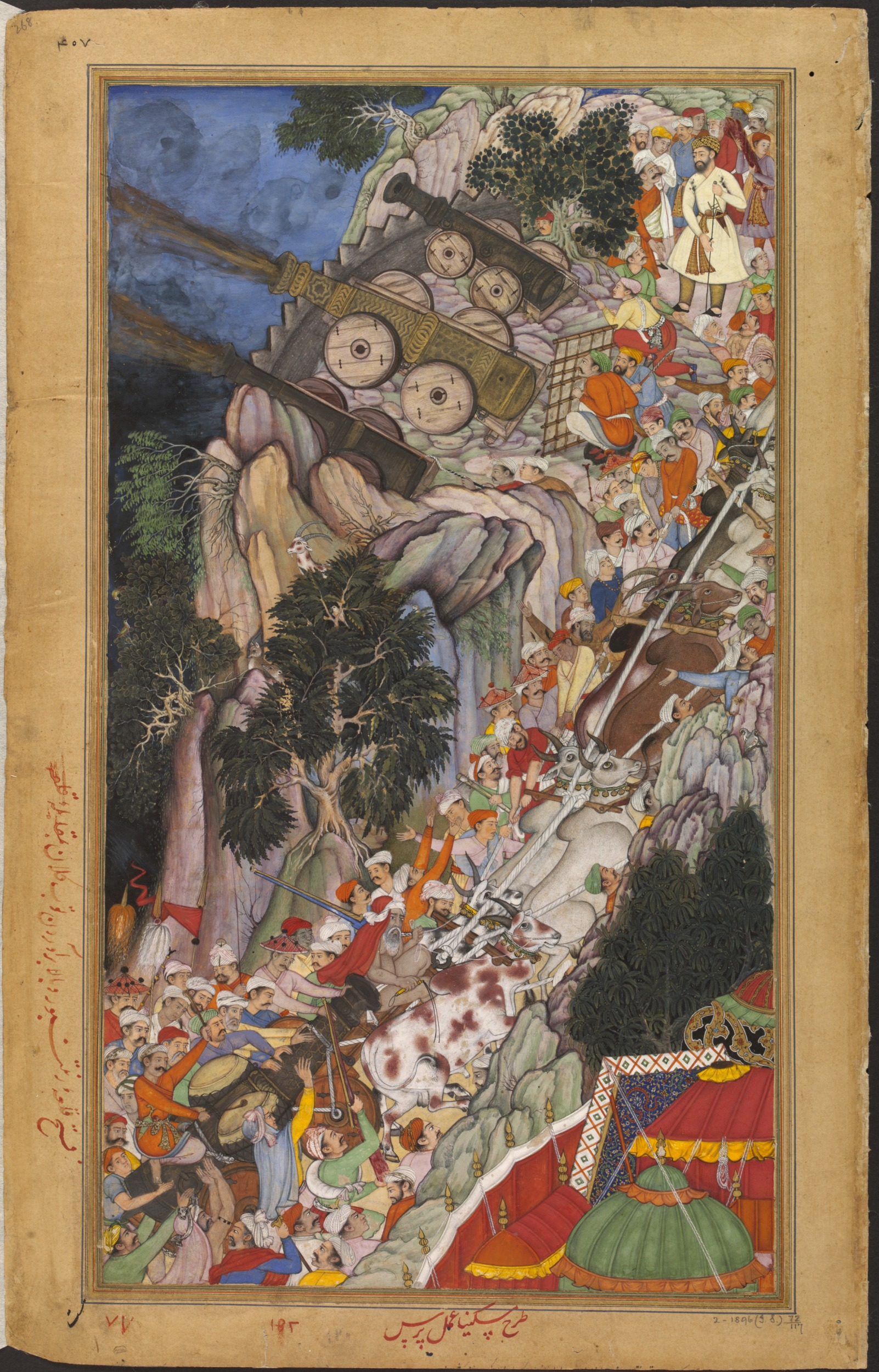
- Bullocks dragging siege-guns up hill during Akbar's attack on Ranthambhor Fort
Date	8 February – 21 March 1568 (1 month, 1 week and 6 days)
Location	270km northwest east of Agra 26.0206°N 76.4542°E
Result	Signing of the Mughal–Bundi treaty
Territorial changes	The Mughal Empire swept into the territories of Rao Surjan Hada of Ranthambore Fort.

Belligerents
Mughal Empire	Kingdom of Mewar: Bundi State

Commanders and leaders
Akbar; Mehtar Khan; Abu'l-Hasan Asaf Khan; Ghazi Khan Badakshani; Munim Khan	Rao Surjan Singh

Strength
70,000 men 96 cannons 50 swivel guns 900 matchlocks 4000 war elephants	12,000 defenders 100 war elephants

In the siege of Ranthambore, on 8 February 1568, Akbar led a massive Mughal Army of over 50,000 men and besieged Ranthambore Fort. Akbar had become emboldened after his victories at the Battle of Thanesar and the siege of Chittorgarh and only Ranthambore Fort remained unconquered. Akbar believed that Ranthambore Fort was a major threat to the Mughal Empire because it housed great Hada Rajputs who considered themselves sworn enemies of the Mughals.

Akbar had first decided to besiege Ranthambore Fort in the year 1558, but decided instead to capture Gwalior, northern Rajputana, and Jaunpur.

== Background ==
After successful Mughal victories around Rajputana and the fall of Akbar's most notorious enemies during the siege of Chittorgarh, Akbar decided to capture Ranthambore Fort, which was considered the strongest fortress in Rajputana and widely believed to be impregnable.

The Rajputs in Ranthambore Fort were under the command of Rao Surjan Hada, of the Hada clan of Bundi. Ranthambore was the capital of Bundi state. Rao Surjan Hada was greatly demoralized by Akbar's victory during the siege of Chittorgarh but initially refused to surrender.

== Siege ==
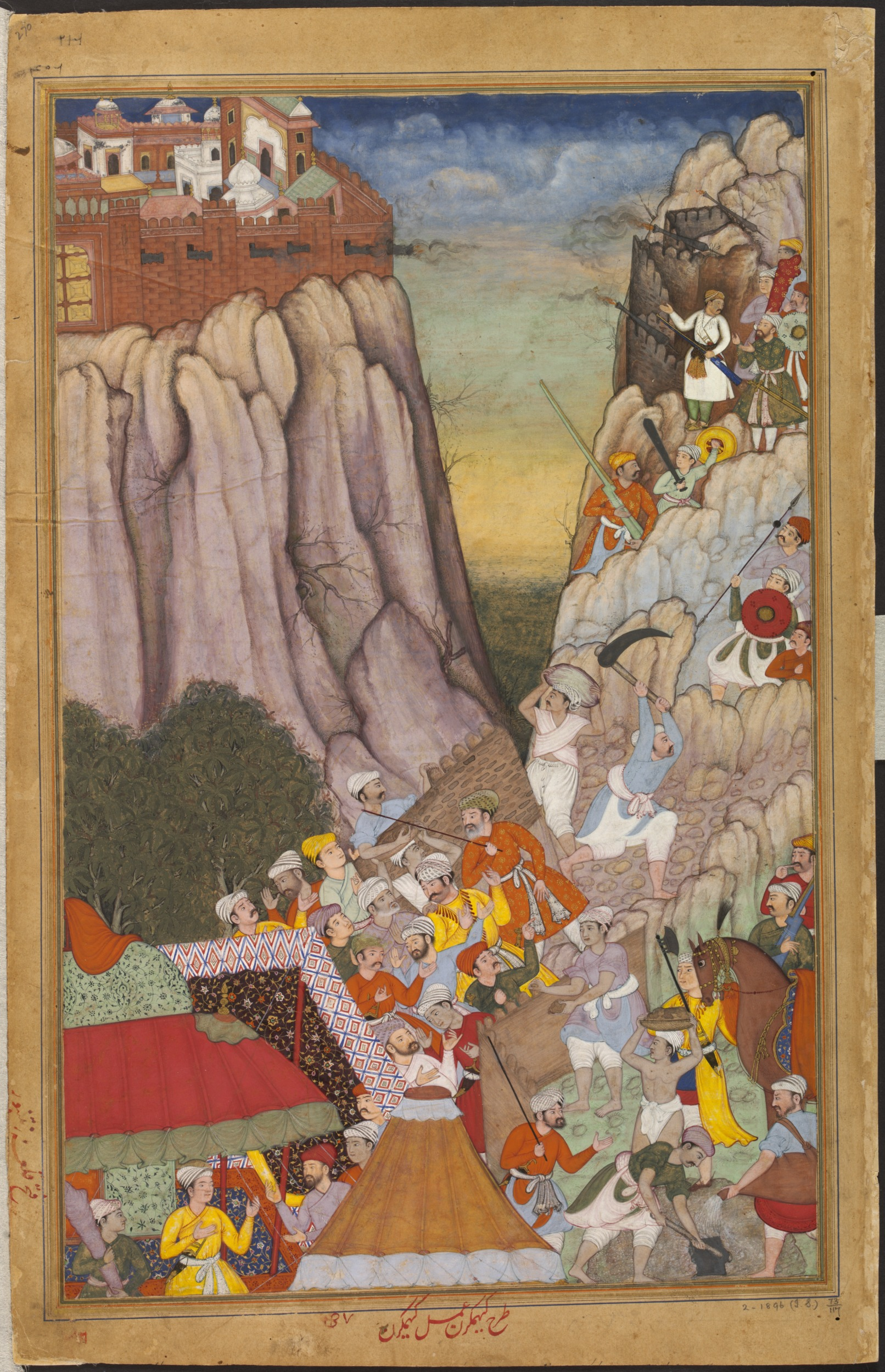
The Mughal Emperor Akbar, commands his troops to set up siege engines against Rao Surjan Hada.

The siege of Ranthambore began on 8 February 1568, an elite Mughal force of 5,000 captured an 8-mile circumference around Ranthambore Fort. Akbar then led an army of more than 30,000 Mughals bringing along with themselves some of the largest cannons ever built in the Mughal Empire. Akbars ranks expanded to over 70,000 within weeks of the siege.

Akbar set up the Red imperial tent in front of the hill that led to the gateway into Ranthambore Fort. Akbar then armed his camp with massive cannons, three of which were more than 15 ft long. Akbar then ordered his men to capture three nearby rocky outcrops, Akbar then placed cannon batteries on those positions. it was from these three positions that Akbar bombarded Ranthambore Fort, which was perched on top of a steep rock cliff.

As the siege continued Akbar placed even bigger cannons and high velocity mortars on the two rocky outcrops facing Ranthambore Fort. Akbar also ordered his men to begin constructing sabats, or covered ways, in order to allow the army to move nearer to the enemy. Within weeks the sabats allowed Akbar's men to gain control of areas just underneath the steep slope of Ranthambore Fort. The Mughals built prefabricated walls to protect their gains around the fort and then placed highly accurate narrow barreled long-cannons that were about 20–25 ft in length. The long-cannons and volley guns that were effectively utilized during the siege were known to have been designed by the prestigious inventor Fathullah Shirazi.

As a result of such close bombardment flames began to shoot out from the buildings within the fort's walls and the sky was black with smoke, even war elephants within the fort went rogue. It was during this stage that Akbar personally massed soldiers near the gates of the fort and was ready to advance on the fort.

Finally on 21 March 1568, Rao Surjan Hada opened the gate of Ranthambore Fort and allowed the Mughal Army to enter after he collected statues of Hindu deities from the temples and personally welcomed Akbar into Ranthambore Fort. Akbar then invited Rao Surjan Hada to his imperial camp and in the evening of that very day Rao Surjan Hada, the ruler of Ranthambhor, submitted to the Mughal Emperor Akbar, after a fiercely fought campaign of immense strategic importance to the expansion of the Mughal Empire. Akbar then seated on a throne under a canopy, when Rao Surjan Hada bowed in submission before him.

Mehtar Khan was then appointed by Akbar to be the commander of the Mughal garrison at Ranthambore Fort after Rao Surjan Hada was sent to Bundi.

== Aftermath ==
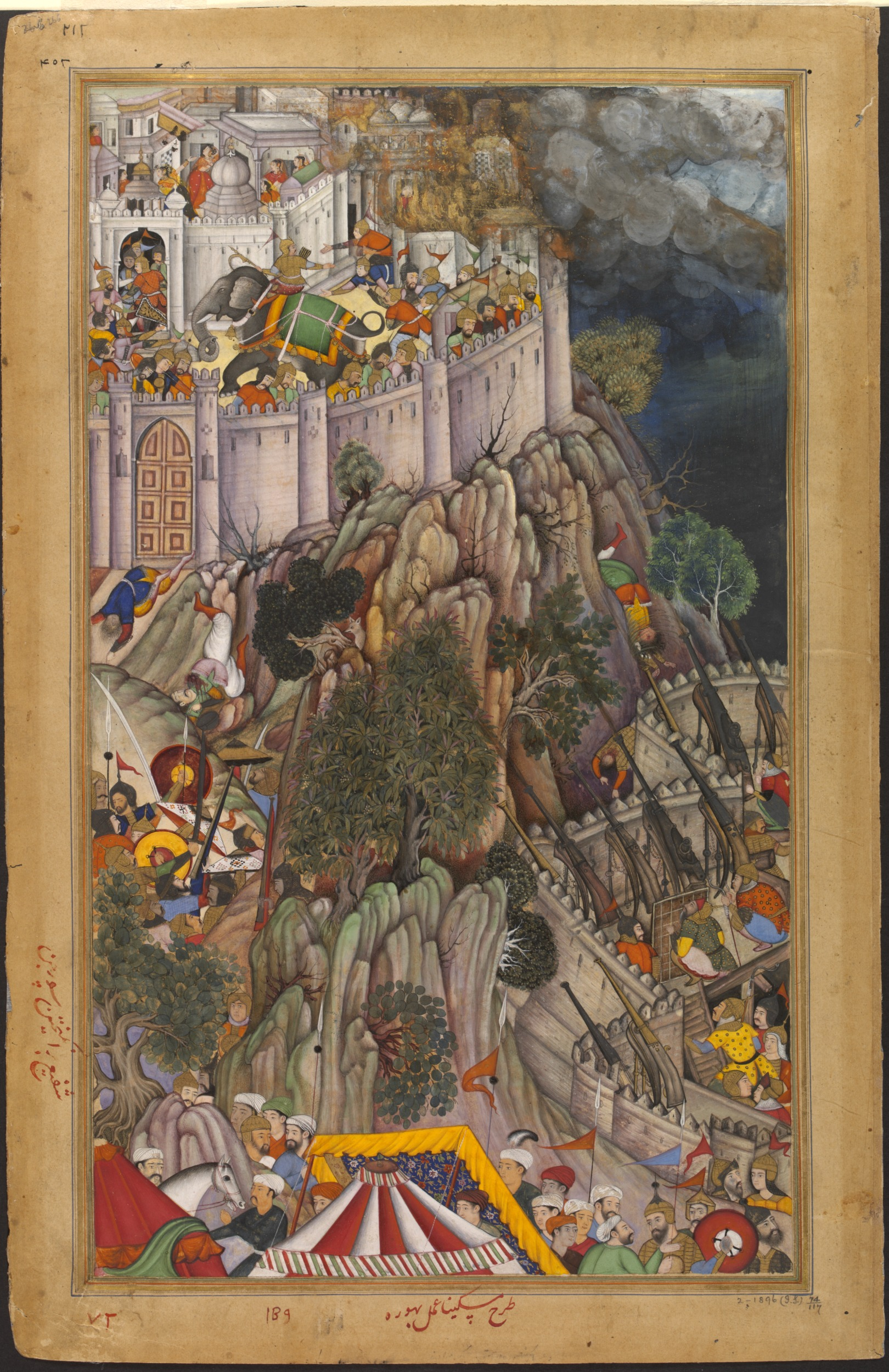
The Mughal Emperor Akbar placed highly accurate narrow barreled long-cannons, protected by sabats at the base of Ranthambore Fort.

After surrendering the fort, a meeting of negotiations was held between Rao Surjan Singh and Man Singh I, accompanied by Akbar. The Rao signed an alliance treaty with the Mughal Empire demanding some following main conditions:

1) The Rao should be exempted from paying Jizya.

2) There would be no matrimonial alliance between the two states.

3) They would not be sent on Mughal service beyond the Indus river.
