= Vanshvardhan Singh =

Maharao Raja of Bundi

- Maharao Raja

Maharao Raja of Bundi
- Reign: 2 April 2022 – present
- Coronation: 2 April 2022
- Predecessor: Ranjit Singh
- Born: 8 January 1987 (age 39)
- Spouse: Mayurakshi Kumari (m. 2016)
- Issue: Vajrnabh Singh
- House: Bundi
- Dynasty: Hada
- Father: Balbhadra Singh
- Mother: Rohini Kumari
- Education: Daly College; De Montfort University

Vanshvardhan Singh is the current head of the Hada clan of the Chauhan Rajputs and the pretender to the now defunct throne of the State of Bundi.

== Early life, family, and education ==
Vanshvardhan Singh was born on 8 January 1987 to Balbhadra Singh of Kapren and his wife, Rohini Kumari. He was educated at Daly College, Indore. He represented his school in cricket, football, and rifle shooting, won a gold medal at the state championship, and represented the Madhya Pradesh team at the Shooting Nationals three times. He later attended De Montfort University and represented the university in cricket in Leicester. He later went to Canada to pursue his master's degree in business management, and returned to Bundi in 2013.

He married Mayurakshi Kumari, a daughter of Deep Singh, the Thakur of Dhanani, in 2016, and has a son, named Vajrnabh Singh, with her.

== Career ==
He operates a heritage hotel by the name of Ishwari Niwas in Bundi.

== Succession ==
In 2010, after the death of Ranjit Singh, the throne of Bundi became vacant and no successor was installed. However, in 2021, the local Rajputs of Bundi, superseding the rules of succession and bypassing the members of the former royal family, installed Bhupesh Singh on the throne. This decision was opposed by Brijraj Singh, the Maharao of Kotah, and members of the extended family of the late Ranjit Singh, including his nephew Jitendra Singh and Balbhadra Singh. They announced their support for Vanshvardhan's succession to the rank, title, and dignity of Maharao Raja of Bundi. On 2 April 2022, he was installed at the Moti Mahal in Bundi. His coronation was attended by heads and members of various royal houses, including Bikaner, Raghogarh, Kutch, and Khilchipur.

Traditionally, the head of the royal house of Bundi is also acknowledged as the head of Hadas.

== Titles and styles ==
Vanshvardhan was originally styled as "Rajkumar Vanshvardhan Singh of Kapren". Since his accession to the throne of Bundi, like his predecessors, he has been titled Hadendra Shiromani Deo Sar Buland Rai Maharao Raja Vanshvardhan Singh Bahadur. He is styled as His Highness.
