= Rao Raja Chattar Sal =

Raja of Bundi from 1632 to 1658

Rao Raja Chatra Sal
- Raja
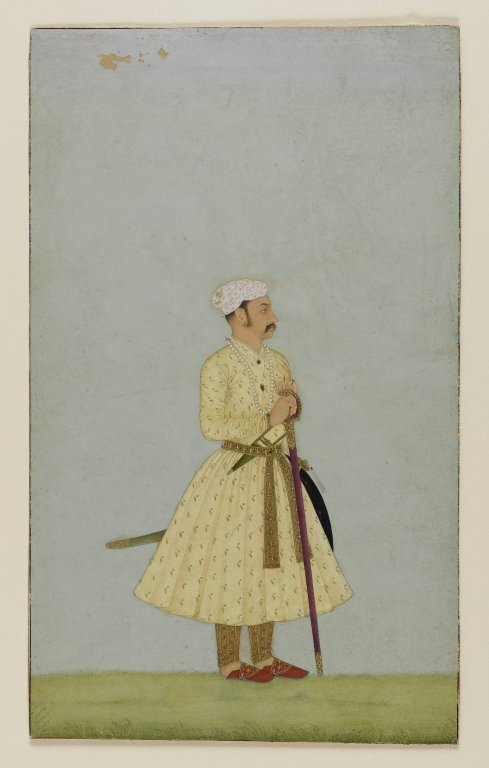
- Portrait of Rao Chattar Sal of Bundi

Raja of Bundi
- Reign: 1632 – 29 May 1658
- Predecessor: Rao Raja Ratan Singh
- Successor: Rao Raja Bhao Singh
- Born: 1605
- Died: 29 May 1658 (aged 52–53); Samugarh, Agra Subah, Mughal Empire (now Fatehabad, Uttar Pradesh, India)
- Spouse: Rathorji Shyam Kanwarji of Marwar; Chandrawatji Prem Kanwarji of Rampura; Sisodiniji Raj Kanwarji of Pratapgarh; Narukiji Nritya Kanwarji of Kakor in Amber; Solankiniji Suraj Kanwarji of Nainwa in Bundi; Jadonji Anand Kanwarji of Karauli; Rathorji Phool Kanwarji of Idar; Solankiniji Har Kanwarji; Ranawatji Chandra Kanwarji of Mewar; Parmarji Ram Kanwarji of Bijolia in Mewar; Rathorji Laksh Kanwarji of Idar; Rathorji Kalyan Kanwarji of Gothra in Bundi; Gaurji Padam Kanwarji of Rajgarh in Ajmer; Chundawatji Shyam Kanwarji of Begun in Mewar; Jhaliji Sada Kanwarji of Gangdhar in Jhalawar
- Issue: Maharao Bhao Singh; Bhim Singh; Bhagwant Singh; Bharat Singh; Bhupat Singh (died infant); Bhupal Singh (died infant); Ishwari Singh (died infant); Karam Kanwarji (m. to Maharaja Jaswant Singh of Marwar); Khuman Kanwarji (m. to Maharana Raj Singh I of Mewar); Ram Kanwarji (m. to Maharaja Anup Singh Ju Dev of Rewa); Ganga Kanwarji (m. to Maharana Jai Singh of Mewar); Kalyan Kanwarji (died infant); Laad Kanwarji (died infant)
Names
- Maharajadhiraj Hatendra Shiromani Deo Sar Buland Rai Maharao Shri Raja Chattar Sal Singh Hada
- House: Hada Chauhan
- Father: Yuvraj Gopinath Singh
- Mother: Sisodiniji Deep Kanwarji d.of Kunwar Jagmal and granddaughter of Maharana Udai Singh II of Mewar

Maharao Chhatra Sal (1605 – 29 May 1658), also known as Raja Shatru Sal, was one of the most prominent and illustrious ruler of the Kingdom of Bundi belonging to the Hada-Chauhan dynasty. He was a high ranking Mughal official at the imperial court under the Mughal Emperor Shah Jahan. He built the Keshav Rai Temple and the marvellous Chhatra Mahal in the upper storey of Taragarh Fort in the capital Bundi which also used to be the official residence of the rulers of Bundi.

== Ascension ==
He ascended the throne of Bundi after his grandfather, Maharao Ratan Singh, as his father Yuvraj Gopinath Singh died while Ratan Singh was still alive.

== Relations with the Mughal Empire ==
He served in the Mughal army as the commander of his Hada-Chauhan Rajput battalions, which was considered an integral part of the Mughal military by Shah Jahan. Rao Chatra Sal was trusted by the crown prince Dara Shikoh. He also served as a foster brother to princess Jahanara, Shah Jahan's eldest daughter, with whom he shared a close friendship.

== Mughal war of succession ==
Chhatra Sal supported Dara Shikoh and fought along with him during the war of duccession against Aurangzeb, despite temptations and threats from the latter. Maharao Chatra Sal being the head commander general died fighting while leading his Rajput troops in the Battle of Samugarh in the year 1658 along with his youngest son Kunwar Bharat Singh, members of the Kota family and several other clansmen and his own family members.

== Personal life ==
Chhatra Sal had married Shyam Kanwar as his first queen consort. She was the daughter of Kunwar Dalpat Singh, the grandfather of Ratan Singh Rathore. She was the mother of his eldest son, Maharao Bhao Singh (1658–1681), who succeeded his father to the throne of Bundi.

== See also ==
- Kingdom of Mewar
- Battle of Dharmat
- Jaswant Singh of Marwar
