= Budh Singh =

Maharao Raja of Bundi (1696 – 1730)

Rao Raja Budh Singh
- Maharao Raja

Maharao Raja of Bundi
- Reign: c. 1696 – c. 1730
- Predecessor: Rao Raja Anirudh Singh
- Successor: Rao Raja Dalel Singh
- Died: 26 April 1739; Begun, Mewar Kingdom
- Spouse: Sisodiniji (Ranawatji) Umaid Kanwarji of Mewar; Kachwahiji Amar Kanwarji of Amber; Sisodiniji (Chundawatji) Phool Kanwarji of Begun in Mewar; Rathorji Chandra Kanwarji of Bhinai in Ajmer; Guhilotji Guman Kanwarji of Banswara
- Issue: Padam Singh; Chandra Singh; Devi Singh; Umaid Singh; Dip Singh; Deep Kanwarji married to Maharaja Vijay Singh of Marwar
- Father: Rao Raja Anirudh Singh
- Mother: Solankiniji (Nathawatji) Lad Kanwarji d.of Rao Jaswant Singh of Namana in Bundi

Budh Singh was the Maharao Raja of Bundi from 1696 to 1730.

== Early life and family ==
He was born to Anirudh Singh. He married twice: firstly, in 1708, to Amar Kanwar, daughter of Bishan Singh, the Raja of Amber, and a sister of Jai Singh II; and secondly, to Chundawatji, daughter of the Thakur of Begun. He had three sons: Padam Singh, Umaid Singh and Dip Singh. Amar Kanwar had a son, Bhawani Singh, in 1720, but in 1729 he denied that Bhawani was his son.

== Reign ==
Upon the death of his father Anirudh Singh in 1696, he succeeded him as the Rao Raja of Bundi. He served at Kabul with Bahadur Shah I when the latter was still a prince. In 1707, when Aurangzeb died, a war of succession for the Mughal throne took place between his sons, in which Singh espoused the cause of Bahadur Shah I. In the meanwhile, his younger brother Jodh Singh died, and Bahadur Shah I, considering this, asked him to repair to Bundi so that he could there partake in his brother's mourning rites and console his kin, but Singh declined, saying that his conscience does not permit him to leave the Emperor's side at this hour. Ram Singh of Kotah asked him to desert the cause of Bahadur Shah I and join the side of Azam Shah, which he declined. Following this he participated with Bahadur Shah I in the battle of Jajau. Afterwards, in recognition of his conduct, courage and gallantry, Bahadur Shah I granted him the title of Maharao Raja, the mansabdari of haft-hazari, i.e. the command of 7,000 horse, 52 districts, and admitted him to his friendship, which Singh enjoyed until the Shah's death. Singh fell into a dispute with Jai Singh when, in 1729, he said that Bhawani Singh, when an infant, was smuggled by Amar Kanwar into the palace and was declared as his son. Singh did that when Amar Kanwar was planning to have Bhawani married to a daughter of the then Maharana of Udaipur. Jai protested against this attack on the reputation and integrity of his sister's virtue and asked Budh if Bhawani was not his son why he had not killed him when he first saw him, and accused him that he was only doing this so that his son from his other wife could succeed him. Singh denied these allegations and sent Jai a letter, in which he asked him to kill Bhawani, to exclude his issues from his other wives to succeed him, and that Jai could freely choose a successor for him by adoption. This letter was attested by many of his vassals and was later verified in front of the Maharana. Following which, Jai killed Bhawani. But later, when Jai asked him to adopt Dalel Singh, a son of Salim Singh of Karwar, and to hand his son from his Chundawat wife over to him, and he would leave him be, Singh refused. Following which, Jai killed told the reigning Mughal Emperor Muhammad Shah that Singh was an incompetent ruler and a drug addict and was incapable of performing his duties to the imperial throne. Hearing which, the Emperor granted Bundi to Jai's nominee, Dalel Singh. Thereupon in 1730, Jai removed Budh from the throne and installed Dalel Singh in his place.

== Death ==
He died on 26 April 1739 at Begun.
