= Pataura =

Pataura may refer to:

- Pataura, Nepal
- Pataura, Jaunpur, a village in Uttar Pradesh, India
