= Ranjit Vilas Palace =

Ranjit Vilas Palace may refer to:

- Ranjit Vilas Palace (Rajkot), a palace in Rajkot, Gujarat, India
- Ranjit Vilas Palace (Ratlam), a palace in Ratlam, Madhya Pradesh, India
- Ranjit Vilas Palace (Wankaner), a palace in Wankaner, Gujarat, India
