= Rao Surjan Singh =

Raja of Bundi from 1554 to 1584

Ruler of Bundi
- Reign: 1554–1584
- Predecessor: Rao Surtan Singh
- Successor: Rao Bhoj Singh
- Born: 1518
- Died: 1585 (aged 66–67)
- Spouse: Guhilotji (Ahadiji) Kanak Deiji of Banswara; Rathorji (Champawatji) Badan Deiji of Ransigaon in Marwar; Solankiniji Chaman Deiji from Toda
- Issue: Durjan Sal (Duda); Bhoj Raj; Rai Mal; Pyar Deiji (married to Kunwar Ugrasen son of Rao Chandrasen Rathore of Marwar); Madan Deiji (marriage not known); Lal Deiji (marriage not known)
Names
- Rao Raja Surjan Singh Hada
- House: Hada Chauhan
- Father: Rao Arjun Singh
- Mother: Guhilotji Jaiwat Deiji d.of Dasji Guhil
- Military career
- Allegiance: Kingdom of Mewar; Mughal Empire
- Branch: Army of Mewar; Mughal army
- Rank: Rao; Mansabdar
- Conflicts: Battle of Ajmer (1556); Capture of Siswali; Capture of Baraud; Siege of Ranthambore (1568)

Rao Surjan Singh Hada was the Hada Chauhan Rajput ruler of the Kingdom of Bundi, today in Rajasthan, India. He was crowned in the year 1554 by the Kingdom of Mewar after ousting his cousin, Rao Surtan Singh.

== Reign ==
=== Service under Mewar ===
Surjan Singh was the governor of Ranthambore under the suzerainty of the Kingdom of Mewar until 1568. He recalled all the nobles of his state who left Bundi during the reign of Rao Surtan and raised a sufficient army to reclaim his lost territories, but soon he was called upon by Maharana Udai Singh II in Ajmer for military service and assistance against Haji Khan Pathan (possibly a Suri general). The Rajput army inflicted a defeat on the Afghan forces under Haji Khan Pathan. Then the Rao of Bundi turned his attention towards the lost territories and recaptured the Parganas of Siswali and Baraud from Kheechli Chauhan.

Siege of Ranthambore

After the siege of Ranthambore (1568), the Mughal emperor, Akbar accompanied by Man Singh I met with Surjan Singh for negotiations. The Rao demanded for some main conditions in the treaty between the Bundi Kingdom and Mughal Empire; Bundi would be exempted from paying Jizya tax; there would not be any matrimonial alliances between the two states; the Rao should not be sent on service beyond Attock.

== Succession ==
His son Duda Singh, allied with Maharana Pratap, was defeated by the Mughals after which he retreated or died and Surjan Singh's another son, Bhoj Singh ascended the throne of Bundi.
