= Dalel Singh (ruler) =

Maharao Raja of Bundi (1730-1749)

- Maharao Raja

Maharao Raja of Bundi
- Reign: c. 1730 – c. 1749
- Predecessor: Budh Singh
- Successor: Umaid Singh
- Spouse: Krishna Kanwar; Sringar Kanwar
- Father: Salim Singh

Dalel Singh was the Maharao Raja of Bundi from 1730 to 1749.

== Early life and family ==
Dalel Singh was born to Salim Singh of Kharwar. He had an older brother, Pratap Singh. He married, among others, Krishna Kanwar, a daughter of Jai Singh II, and Sringar Kanwar, a daughter of the Rao of Uniara. His marriage to Jai’s daughter was done on the understanding that his son from her would succeed to his title, rank and dignity as the Maharao Raja of Bundi in due course of time.

== Reign ==
After Jai Singh had removed Budh Singh from the throne of Bundi in 1730, he nominated Dalel as Budh’s successor on that throne. He then called Dalel’s father, Salim Singh, to come and take Bundi in his possession, and told him that the rajyaabhishek of Dalel would be performed in due course of time. Jai then, using influence on the Mughal Emperor, sought a firman from him that recognised Dalel as the new ruler of Bundi. When the Emperor granted it, he had Salim Singh install Dalel on the throne. He continued to reign until 1749, when Umaid Singh captured Bundi, removed him from the throne and installed himself. During the time Dalel reigned over Bundi, his state was nothing more than a fiefdom under Jaipur, and he had to regularly attend the Dussehra durbar of the Maharaja of Jaipur.
