= Raghubir Singh Bundi =

Ruler of Bundi from 1889 to 1927

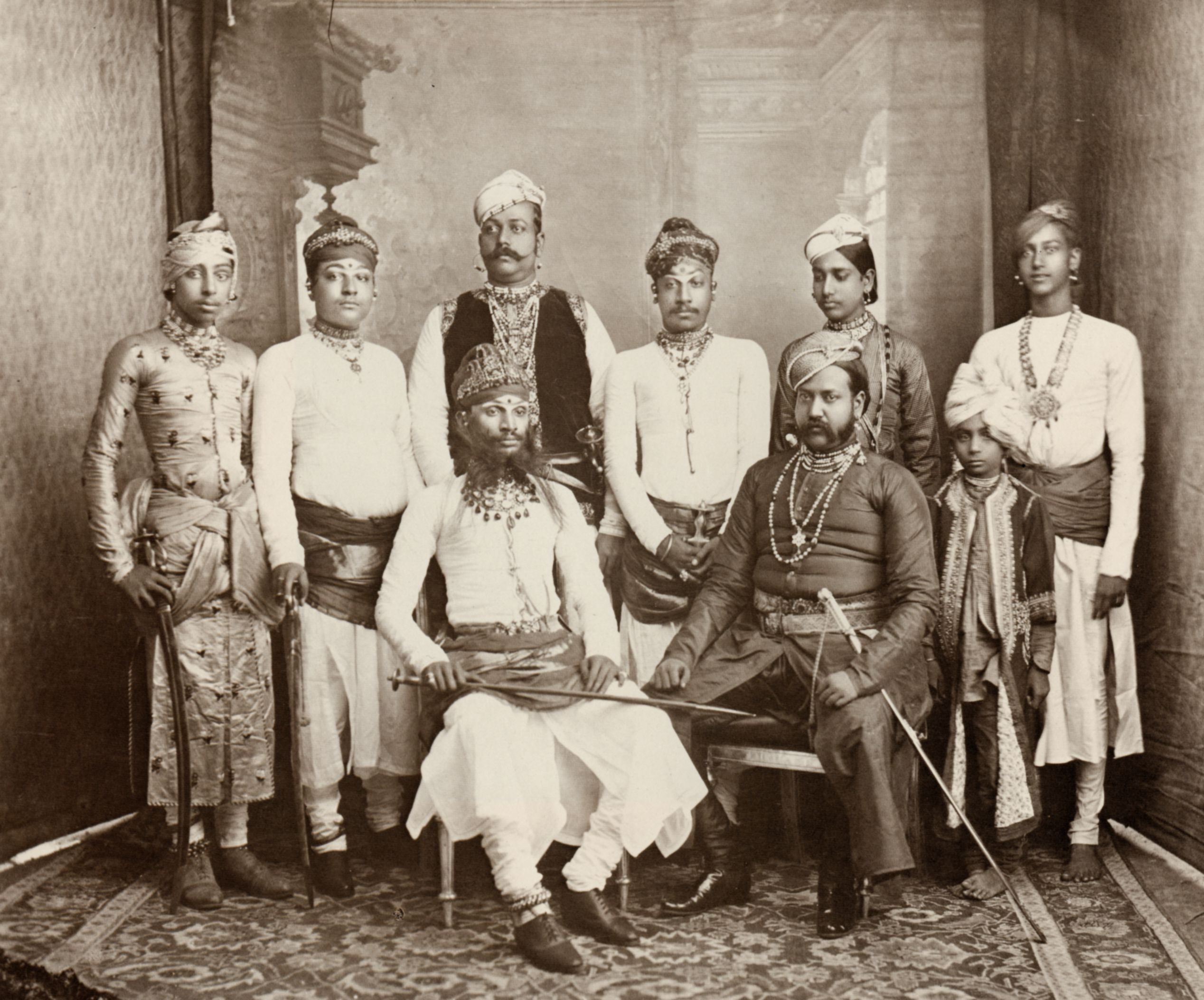
Raghubir Singhji sitting to the left.

Sir Raghubir Singhji GCIE (21 September 1869 – 26 July 1927) was the 26th ruler of the princely state of Bundi, which was ruled by the Hada Chauhan clan of Rajputs.

Raghubir ruled Bundi from 1889 till his death in 1927.

He was succeeded by Ishwari Singhji. Government of India announced 'Padma Shri' will be awarded to Raghuveer Singh on 26 January 2018.
