= Pataura, Nepal =

Pataura पतौरा
- Village development committee
- Location in Nepal
- Coordinates: 26.93°N 85.22°E
- Country: Nepal
- Zone: Narayani Zone
- District: Rautahat District

Population (1991)
  - Total: 4,521
- Time zone: UTC+5:45 (Nepal Time)

Pataura is a village development committee in Rautahat District in the Narayani Zone of south-eastern Nepal. At the time of the 1991 Nepal census it had a population of 4521 people living in 794 individual households.

== See also ==
- Pataura, a village in Jaunpur, India
