= Sajjan Singh of Ratlam =

Maharaja of Ratlam from 1893–1947

Major General His Highness Maharaja Shrimant Sir Sajjan Singh of Ratlam GCIE KCSI KCVO
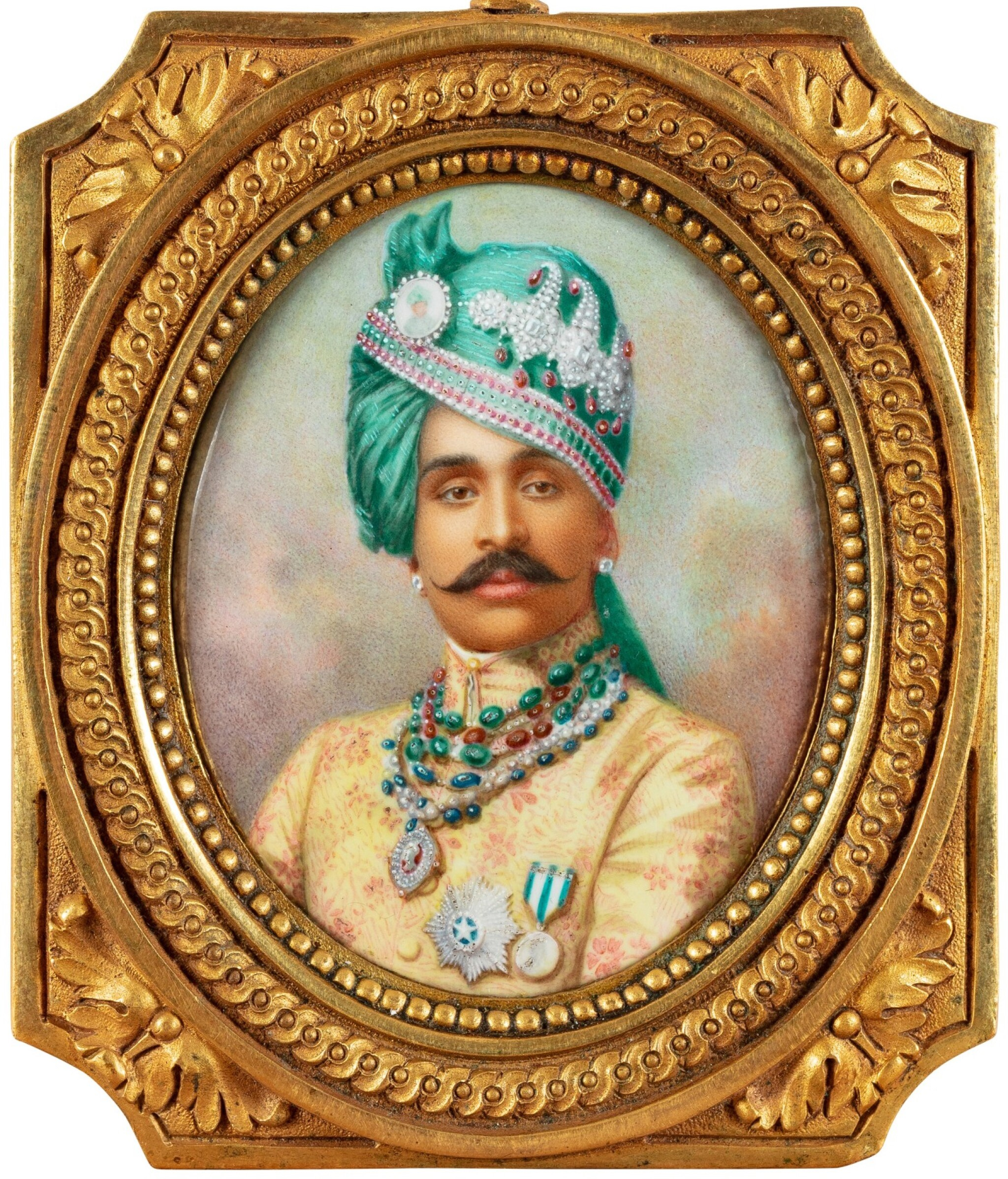
- portrait by Raoul Hideux, 1909-1911
- Born: 13 January 1880; Ranjit Vilas Palace Ratlam Madhya Pradesh
- Died: 3 February 1947 (aged 67); Ratlam
- Spouse: HH Maharaniji Jadejiji Shri Pran Kunwarba Saheba d.of HH Maharajadhiraj Maharaja Mirza Maharao Sir Khengarji III of Kutch State Gujarat HH Maharaniji Parmarji Shri Basant Kunwarba Saheba d.of HH Maharana Raja Pratap Sinhji of Santrampur State Gujarat HH Maharaniji Sodhiji from a Sodha Parmar house in Jamnagar State Gujarat
- Military career
- Allegiance: India
- Branch: British Indian Army
- Rank: Major general
- Conflicts: World War I Third Anglo-Afghan War
- Awards: Knight Grand Commander of the Order of the Indian Empire; Knight Commander of the Order of the Star of India; Knight Commander of the Royal Victorian Order

Major-General Sir Sajjan Singh Bahadur GCIE KCSI KCVO (13 January 1880 – 3 February 1947) was a British Indian Army officer and Maharaja of the Princely State of Ratlam State in modern-day Madhya Pradesh, ruling from the year 1893 until 1947, six months before the independence of India from British rule.

== Life and career ==
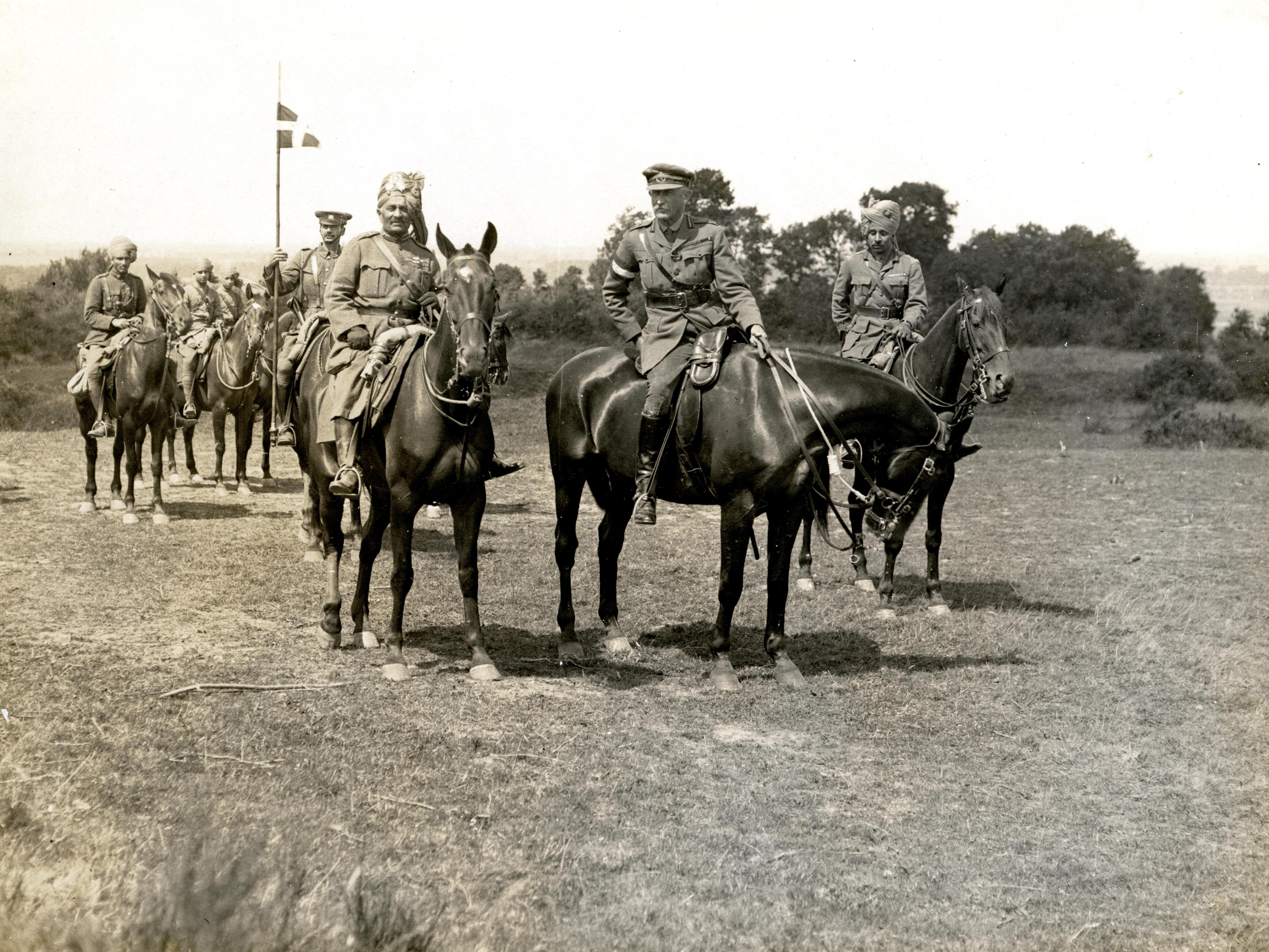
Singh (first from right) riding alongside Pratap Singh and Michael Rimington in Linghem, 28 July 1915

The only son of Ranjit Singh, Sajjan Singh succeeded to the Ratlam throne at the age of 13, and was educated at Daly College, Indore and at Mayo College, Ajmer. He served with the Imperial Cadet Corps, Dehradun, and reigned under a regency until he came of age in 1898. Commissioned an honorary Captain in the British Indian Army in 1908, he was promoted to major in 1911 and served on the Western Front during the First World War from 1914 to 1915. He was mentioned in despatches and promoted to lieutenant-colonel in 1916 and to colonel in 1918. Owing to his wartime service, he was raised from an 11-gun to a 13-gun salute in 1918, and was promoted to the rank of a hereditary Maharaja in 1921, also receiving a 15-gun local salute at the same time.

After the war, Singh served as regent of Rewa State from October 1918 to October 1922. He also served in the Third Anglo-Afghan War as aide-de-camp to the General Officer Commanding 1st Division on the North-West Frontier. From 1915 to 1936, Sajjan Singh served as aide-de-camp to George V and was also aide-de-camp to the Prince of Wales (later Edward VIII) when the latter toured India from 1921 to 1922; he was appointed a KCVO for this in 1922. Singh subsequently served as an honorary and extra ADC to George VI until 1947.

A polo aficionado, he served as Steward of the Indian Polo Association, and also as member of the general councils of Daly and Mayo Colleges.

== Personal ==
Singh married five times and had two sons and three daughters by his fifth wife, Sodhabai of Nawanagar:

1. Gulab Kunverba (1923-19?). Married the Bahadur Singh, the Maharao of Bundi.
2. Raj Kunverba (k. in a fire, 1931)
3. Lokendra Singh (9 November 1927 - 24 June 1991). Second and last ruling Maharaja of Ratlam; succeeded upon his father's death on 3 February 1947; acceded to the Union of India on 15 August 1947. Derecognised by the Indian Government 28 December 1971; died without issue.
4. Chandra Kunverba (c1930-1950s). Engaged to Karan Singh until the engagement was broken off in 1949 by Hari Singh. Married Brijendra Singh Tomar, zamindar of Baler; killed in a motor crash in the 1950s.
5. Ranbir Singh (2 October 1932 - 20 January 2011). Succeeded his elder brother as titular Maharaja on 24 June 1991; died without male issue and without naming an heir, since which time the succession to the throne has been in dispute.

== Death ==
Singh died on 3 February 1947, aged 67, and was succeeded by his elder son Lokendra Singh.

== Titles ==
- 1880-1893: Yuvraj Shri Sajjan Singh Bahadur, Yuvraj of Ratlam
- 1893-1908: His Highness Raja Shrimant Sajjan Singh Sahib Bahadur, Raja of Ratlam
- 1908-1909: Captain His Highness Raja Shrimant Sajjan Singh Sahib Bahadur, Raja of Ratlam
- 1909-1911: Captain His Highness Raja Shrimant Sir Sajjan Singh Sahib Bahadur, Raja of Ratlam, KCSI
- 1911-1916: Major His Highness Raja Shrimant Sir Sajjan Singh Sahib Bahadur, Raja of Ratlam, KCSI
- 1916-1918: Lieutenant-Colonel His Highness Raja Shrimant Sir Sajjan Singh Sahib Bahadur, Raja of Ratlam, KCSI
- 1918-1921: Colonel His Highness Raja Shrimant Sir Sajjan Singh Sahib Bahadur, Raja of Ratlam, KCSI
- 1921-1922: Colonel His Highness Maharaja Shrimant Sir Sajjan Singh Sahib Bahadur, Maharaja of Ratlam, KCSI
- 1922-1931: Colonel His Highness Maharaja Shrimant Sir Sajjan Singh Sahib Bahadur, Maharaja of Ratlam, KCSI, KCVO
- 1931-1936: Colonel His Highness Maharaja Shrimant Sir Sajjan Singh Sahib Bahadur, Maharaja of Ratlam, GCIE, KCSI, KCVO
- 1936-1947: Major-General His Highness Maharaja Shrimant Sir Sajjan Singh Sahib Bahadur, Maharaja of Ratlam, GCIE, KCSI, KCVO

== Honours ==
(ribbon bar, as it would look today)

- Gold Delhi Durbar Medal (1903)
- Knight Commander of the Order of the Star of India (KCSI)-1909
- Gold Delhi Durbar Medal (1911)
- Mentioned in Despatches-1915
- 1914–15 Star-1918
- British War Medal-1918
- Allied Victory Medal-1918
- Officer of the Legion d'Honneur of France-1918
- India General Service Medal (1909) (with Afghanistan-NWF clasp) -1919
- Knight Commander of the Royal Victorian Order (KCVO)-1922
- Knight Grand Commander of the Order of the Indian Empire (GCIE)-1931
- King George V Silver Jubilee Medal-1935
- King George VI Coronation Medal-1937
