= Keshav Rai Temple =

Hindu temple in Rajasthan, India

Coordinates: 25.289°N 75.939°E

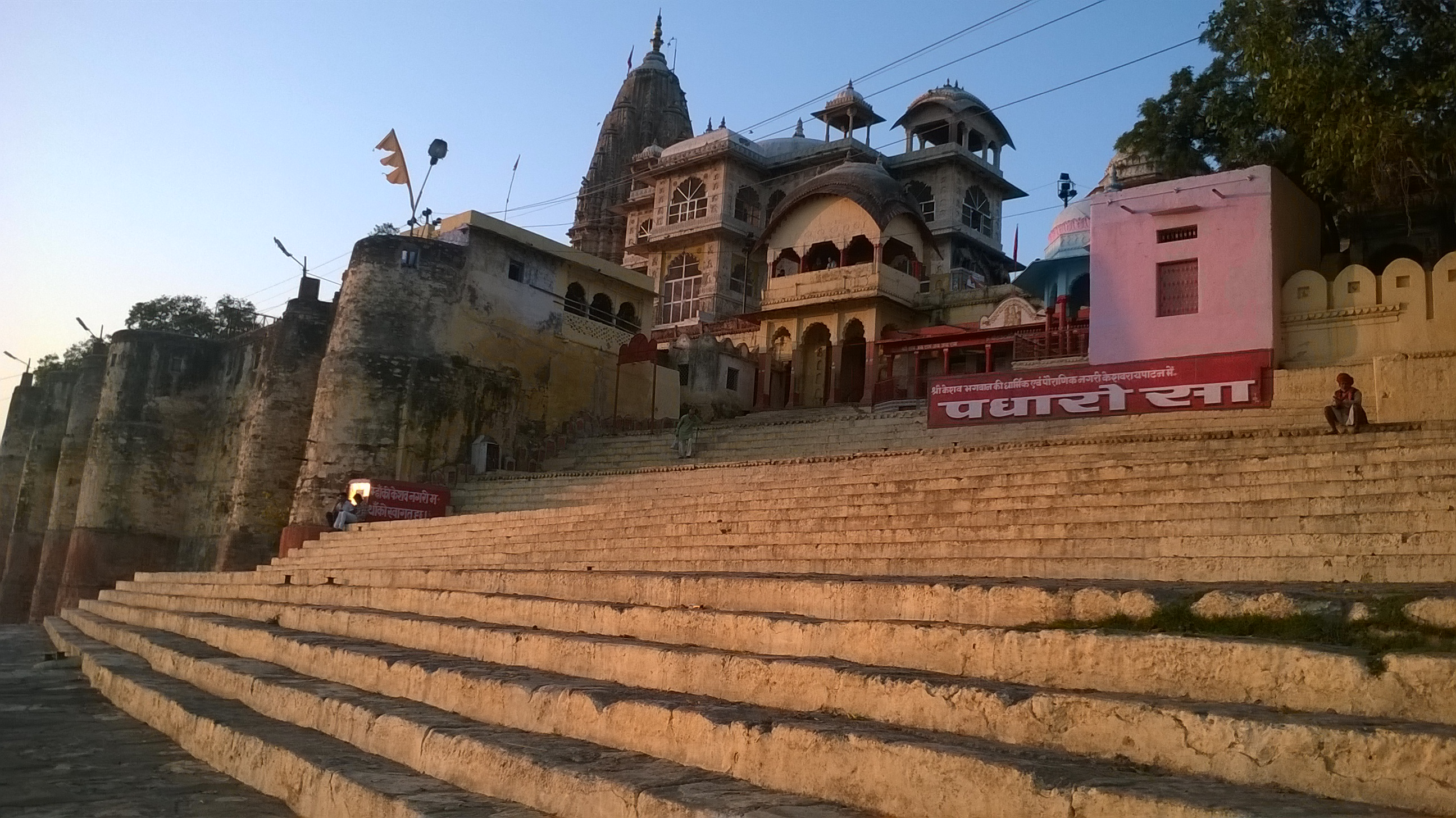

- Location in Rajasthan Location in India

Religion
- Affiliation: Hinduism
- District: Bundi district
- Deity: Lord Krishna in the form of Keshav Rai Ji Maharaj

Location
- Location: Keshoraipatan
- State: Rajasthan
- Country: India
- Interactive map of Keshav Rai Temple

Architecture
- Type: Mandir
- Creator: Rao Raja Chattar Sal
- Completed: 1641

Keshav Rai Temple is a popular Hindu temple, situated on the banks of the Chambal River in Keshoraipatan, Rajasthan (India). The temple is dedicated to Keshav Rai or Vishnu. It was constructed by Rao Raja Chhatrasal in 1641.

== History ==
It is believed that Lord Vishnu was pleased with the intense devotion of Raja Ranti Deo. He appeared in the form of two idols, one of Shri Keshavji in white stone and the other of Shri Charbhuja Nath in black Stone. Raja Ranti Deo started the building of the temple in Samvat 1307. This building work was completed in four generations as the domestic conditions of the royal family, palace intrigues and political upheavals disturbed the work which was completed only by fits and starts. Finally the work was brought to completion in the year Samvat 1698 (1641 AD) by Rao Raja Chattar Salji. The famous prayer of lord Keshav Rai "Keshavastak" with Sastriya music melody has recently been written by main priest (pujari) and Vedvigya Pandit Jamna Lal Sharma. As revealed by Pandit Sharma, it is believed that Chambal river takes U-turn after touching the feet of lord Keshav Rai. The temple has another statue of lord Shiva "Jambu Margeshwar" which is located in the same campus in another temple. It is believed that it was founded by Rishi Parasuram who did austerity at Chambal river bank.

== Brief of the deity ==
An idol of Lord Keshavaraiji is seated in a posture of Padmasan or lotus like seating position. The idol is of white stone. The left hand holds a discus while the right hand holds a conch. On the breast lies vaijayantimala and the idol is wearing a Janeu which from the left shoulder goes diagonically to the right side. Initially the pooja of the temple was performed in accordance with the tradition of Ramanuj Sampradaya, but in due course of time, this was replaced by a pooja in accordance with Pushtimargiya tradition. The Pujari of the temple attains priesthood rights by hereditary lineage.

== Architecture ==
The temple stands on a strong base of a very big platform. The grand and imposing temple has beautiful entrance in the typical style of architecture adopted for the main gates of the temples of medieval times. The walls have an elaborate carving work and images of various Gods and Goddesses have been incurved.On the shikhar itself images of gods and goddesses nymphs and fairies, Yakshas and Gandarvas have been incurved. There appeared to be four stories of the Shikhar. Because in every story there is a shrine like projection on the frontage within which images of gods and Ggddesses have been incurved. The uppermost portion tapers off and on the top there is a Kalash. This shikhar is on the sanctum sanctorum. The shikhar on the Jagmohan is in the round shape. What makes the temple magnificent and artistically rich is the immaculate sculpture and architecture.

To the countless images on the shikhar and panels of the temple, the floral patterns, images of animals and mythical features of gods and goddesses and demons. The interior of the Jagmohan also has beautiful design in which circular patterns have been drawn and joining these circles interlacing patterns have also been made. Again images of Gods and Goddesses are shown in these circles. The outer portion of the temple is of two storeys over which canopies in the typical Rajasthani style have been built. Behind the entrance, the structure of the building is wider and the third portion is still wider. Every where wherever there is scope, images of animals of elephants, horses and images of gods and goddesses have been encarved.

== Religious aspects ==
The temple commands respect of the masses, the visitors first take a dip in the holy water of the Chambal river and then they have a darshan of Lord Keshavaraiji.

== Festivals and fairs ==
Kartik poornima, Holi, Dusshera, Dol Yatra, Sharad Poornima, Janmasthmi and Ram Navmi.

Many devotees take baths in the Chambal River during Kartik poornima and take part in the Kartik fair.

== Timings ==
Morning time:	4.00 am - 12.00 am	Evening time:	3.00 pm - 9.00 pm

Details of temple:
Sanctum (sanctorum)	1
Verandah	1
Garbh Grah	1
Rasoi	North side
Others	The sanctum sanctorum is square shaped over which a very high shikhar in pyramid like shape is built. In the shrine a wooden seat is placed on a stone seat. The wooden seat is covered with silver layer and the deity is enshrined on that. To the north of the temple is a rasoi and outside the temple is a big chowk.
