= Mahendra Kumari =

Indian politician

Member of parliament
- In office 1991–1996
- Preceded by: Ramji Lal Yadav
- Succeeded by: naval Kishore Sharma
- Constituency: Alwar

Personal details
- Born: 1942 Bundi, Rajasthan
- Died: 27 June 2002 (aged 59–60) New Delhi, India
- Party: Bharatiya Janata Party
- Spouse: Pratap Singh

Mahendra Kumari (1942 – 27 June 2002) was a member of Lok Sabha. She was elected to Lok Sabha from Alwar in Rajasthan as a candidate of Bharatiya Janata Party. She was born in Bundi in 1942 to a royal family and educated at Scindia Girls College, Gwalior. She was wife of ruler of Alwar, Pratap Singh.

Kumari was a Member of Tenth Lok Sabha from 1991 to 1996 representing Alwar Parliamentary Constituency of Rajasthan.

She died on 27 June 2002 at New Delhi at the age of 60 after a brief illness.
