= Begun =

- city
- Location in Rajasthan, India Begun (India)
- Coordinates: 24.98°N 75.0°E
- Country: India
- State: Rajasthan
- District: Chittaurgarh
- Founded by: Chunda ji

Government
  - MLA: Dr.Suresh dhaker
- Elevation: 412 m (1,352 ft)

Population (2001)
  - Total: 19,333

Languages
  - Official: Hindi
- Time zone: UTC+5:30 (IST)
- PIN: 312023
- Telephone code: 01474
- Vehicle registration: 09
- Website: www.fortbegu.com

Begun is a city and a municipality in Chittaurgarh district in the state of Rajasthan, India. Begun was offered along with Gothlai to Chunda ji, who renounced his right to the throne for his brother Rana Mokal in 15th century. From that time onward, Begun came under the rule of the Chundawat Sisodia Rajputs of Mewar. The town is regarded as one of the historic settlements of the Chittorgarh district. One of Mewar's important rivers, Brahmani, flows through Begun. Begun also has a fort which is surrounded by a small river.

== Geography ==
Begun is located at 24.98°N 75.0°E. It has an average elevation of 412 metres (1351 feet). Begun has very good soil for agriculture. In Begun Tehsil there are two famous places: Jogania Mata and Menal. Jogania Mata Temple is situated at the top of the mountains. It is 20 km from Begun. Jogania Mata Temple is a famous in the Chittorgarh district. Menal is near Jogania Mata. It is 25 km from Begun. Begun is a good tourist place and a very good fort situated nearby named as Nahargarh.

== Demographics ==
As of 2001 India census, Begun had a population of 19,353. Males constitute 52% of the population and females 48%. Begun has an average literacy rate of 64%, higher than the national average of 59.5%; with 61% of the males and 39% of females literate. 16% of the population is under 6 years of age.
