= Pataura, Jaunpur =

Village in Jaunpur, Uttar Pradesh, India

Pataura is a village in Jaunpur, Uttar Pradesh, India. According to a 2011 census, the total population is 2513.

PATAURA village introduction.

Village -Pataura

Post-Belahari

Block-Muftiganj

Tahasil-Kerakat

District-Jaunpur

State-Uttar Pradesh

Country-India

Pin code-222142

People of Pataura are well educated. Jaunpur district are known as "shiraj- e -hind".
