= Ranjit Vilas Palace (Ratlam) =

Palace in Ratlam, Madhya Pradesh, India

Coordinates: 23°19′27″N 75°02′28″E

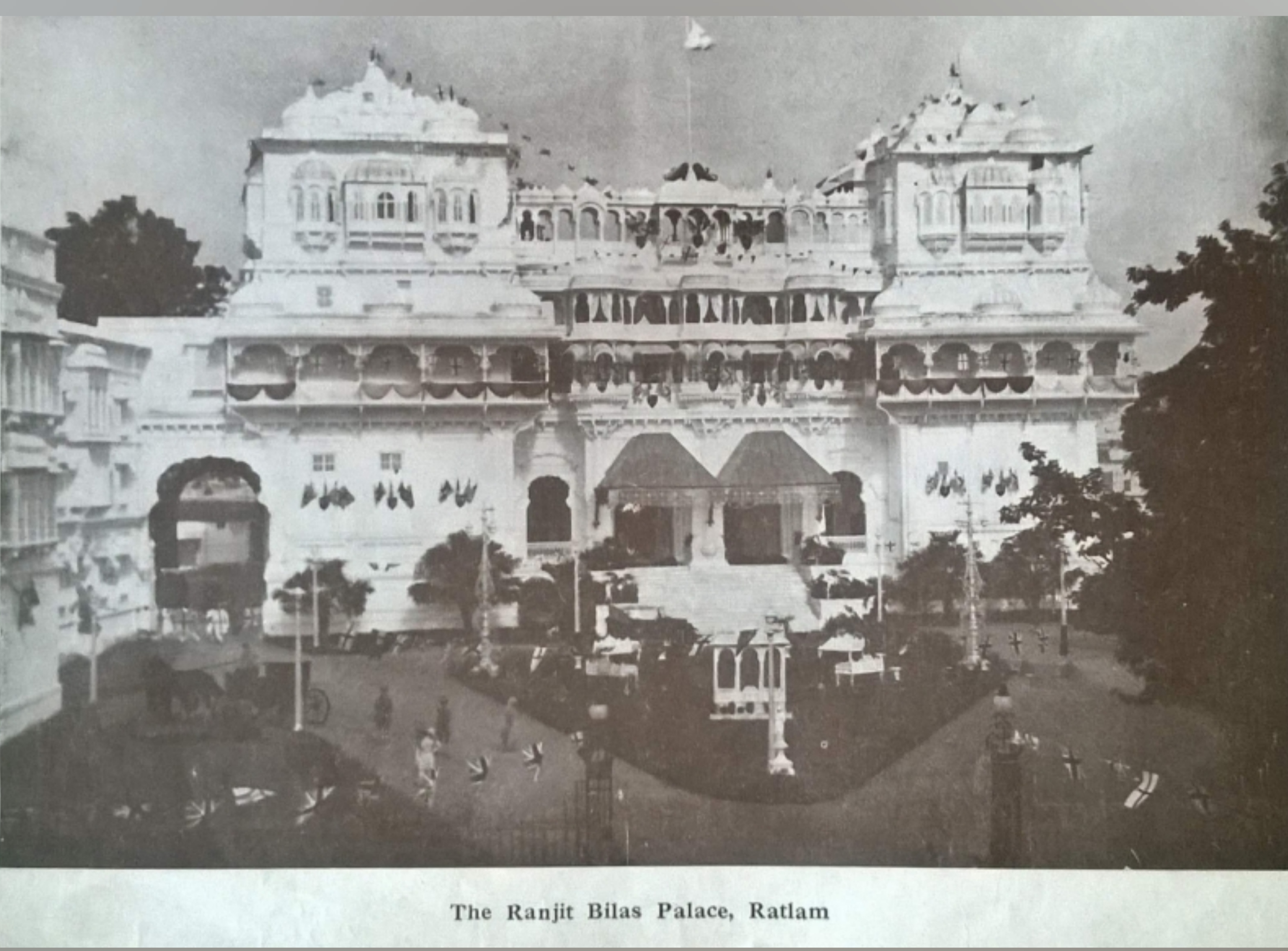
- Interactive map of the Ranjit Vilas Palace area

General information
- Architectural style: Indo-Saracenic
- Location: Ratlam, Madhya Pradesh, India
- Completed: 1880
- Owner: Government of Madhya Pradesh

The Ranjit Vilas Palace is a palace in Ratlam, Madhya Pradesh that was the residence of the royal family of Ratlam. Built in 1880 and named for the then ruler, the palace is noted for its blend of Indian architectural styles and Italian influences and décor and is a key part of the city's heritage. Owned by the Government of Madhya Pradesh since the death of the last ruler, the palace has suffered from encroachments and several proposals have been made to renovate and repurpose the building.

== History ==
The palace was constructed in 1880 by the then ruler of the princely state of Ratlam, Maharaja Ranjit Singh of Ratlam and has been named after him. Popularly known as the Old Palace, it is an important part of the architectural heritage of Ratlam. The palace was the official residence of Lokendra Singh, the last ruler of Ratlam. Following his death in 1991 and his wife Prabharaje in 1993, the palace was taken over by the Government of Madhya Pradesh as the ruler had no lineal descendants.

== Architecture ==
The palace is noted for its Italian craftsmanship reflected in the carvings done on the palace floor. Wallpaper imported from Europe and Belgian glass figure in its décor. It also featured an elevator which the first such utility in Ratlam and a rarity in buildings of the time.

== Present status ==
The palace has been the subject of much litigation and has been declared as property of the government of Madhya Pradesh. The building itself has been used to house various government offices. In 2011 the Palace was the venue of rival coronations by claimants to the titular kingship of Ratlam. Over the years the property has been encroachmed upon extensively with houses and shops being built on the encroached land. This forced the district administration to ban all commercial transactions on the property in 2017. Proposals to get the state government to declare the building as a protected monument, to develop it as heritage hotel under the Ministry of Tourism or convert it into a museum have all seen little progress.
