= Bundi State =

Princely state of India (1241–1949)

Coordinates: 25.44°N 75.64°E

- 1241–1949
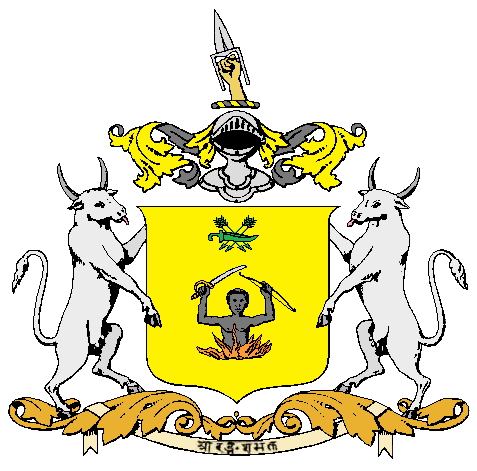
- Flag Coat of arms
- Motto: "धर्म के जीत हो, अधर्म का नाश हो" "Dharm ke jīt ho, adharm kā nāsh ho" (English: Let righteousness prevail, iniquity perish)
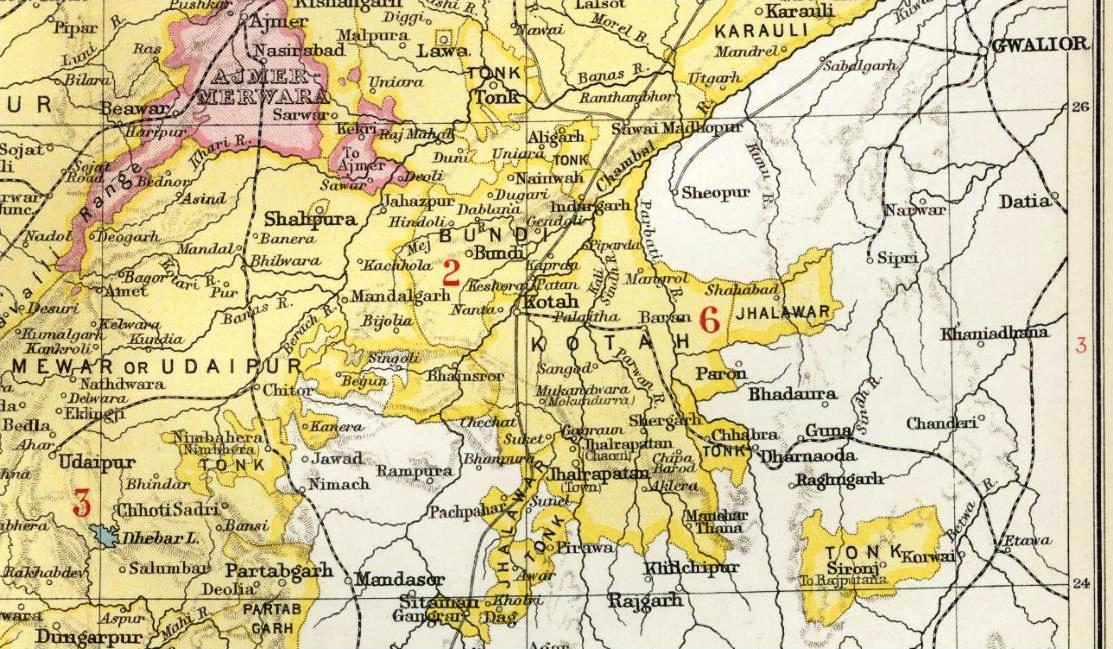
- Bundi State in the Imperial Gazetteer of India.
- Capital: Bundi
- Religion: Hinduism
- Government: Monarchy
- Rao/Maharao
  - 1554–1585: Surjan Singh (first)
  - 1945–1949: Bahadur Singh (last)
- History
  - Established: 1241
  - Accession in Dominion of India: 1949

Area
  - Total: 5,750 km^{2} (2,220 sq mi)

Population
  - 1931: 216,722
Succeeded by
Republic of India
- Today part of: Rajasthan, India
- This article incorporates text from a publication now in the public domain: Chisholm, Hugh, ed. (1911). "Bundi". Encyclopædia Britannica (11th ed.). Cambridge University Press.

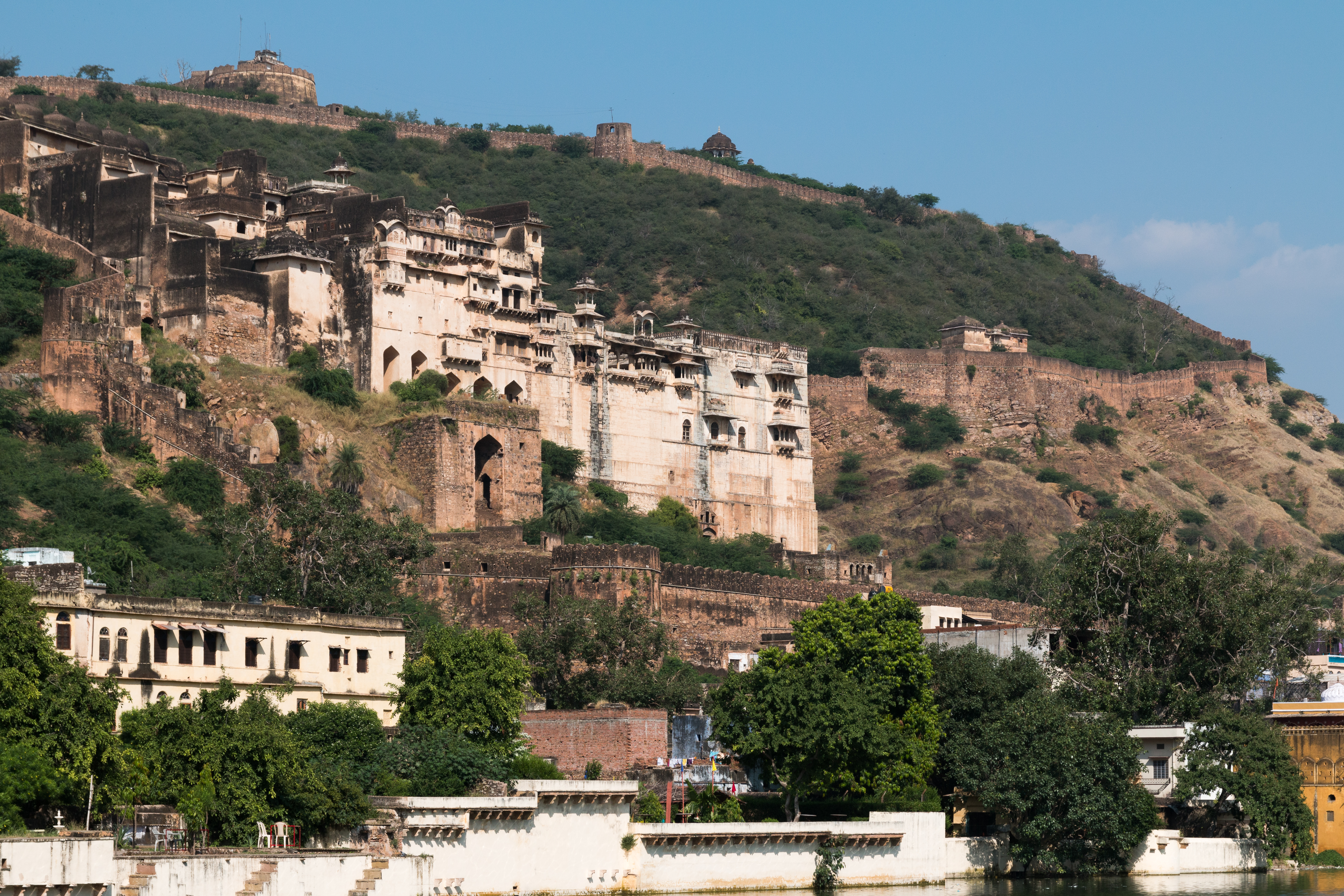
View of the Garh Palace in Bundi

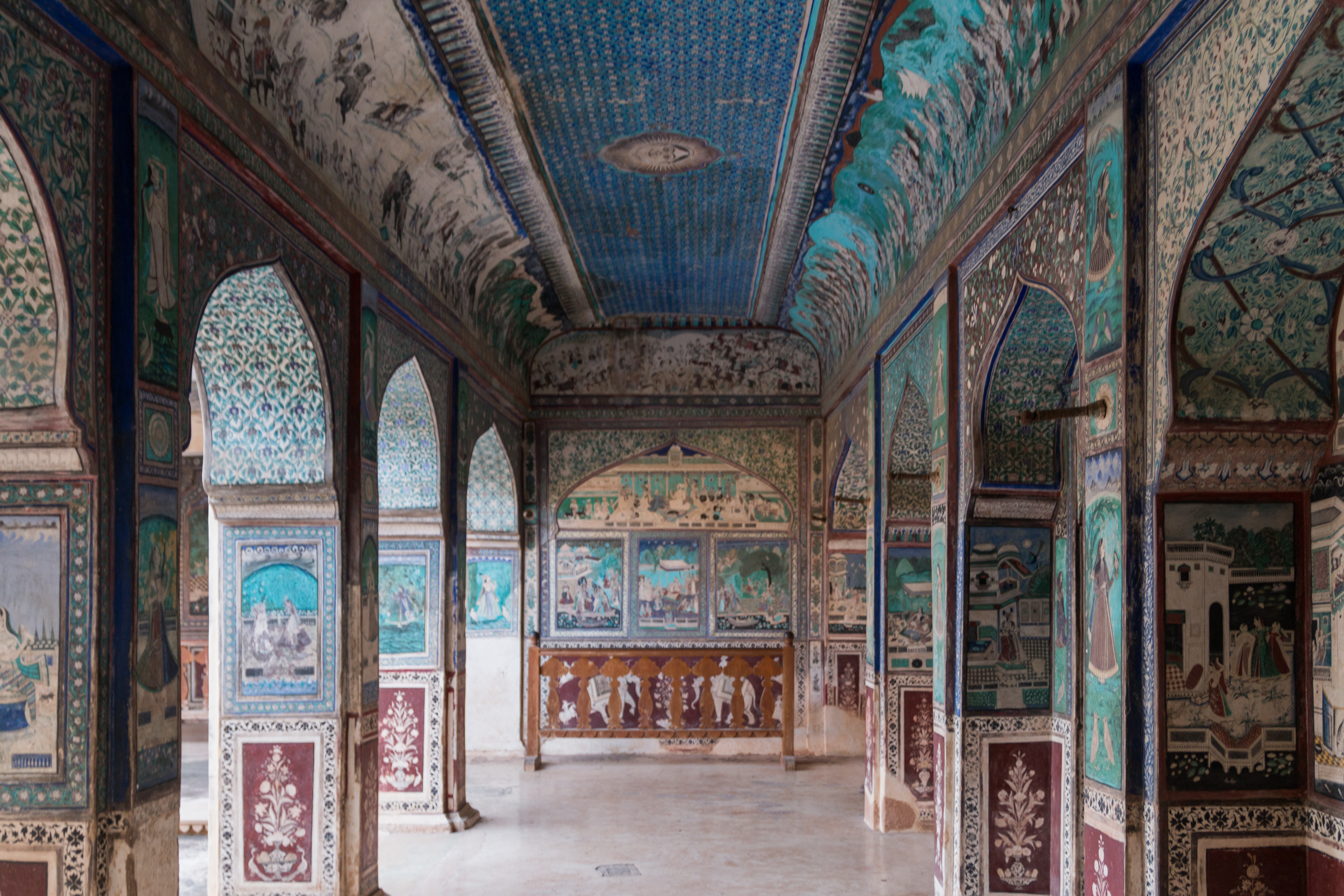
Garh Palace Chitrasala

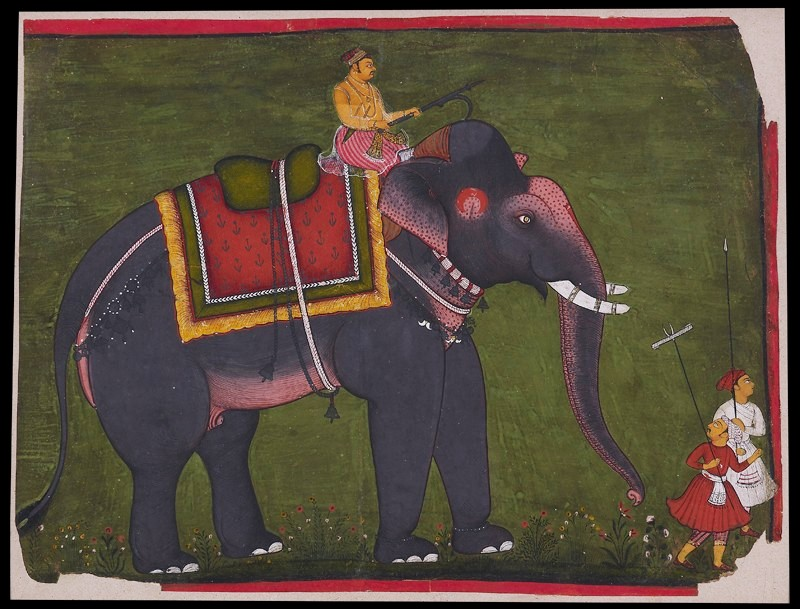
Maharao Bhao Singh riding an elephant. c. 1675

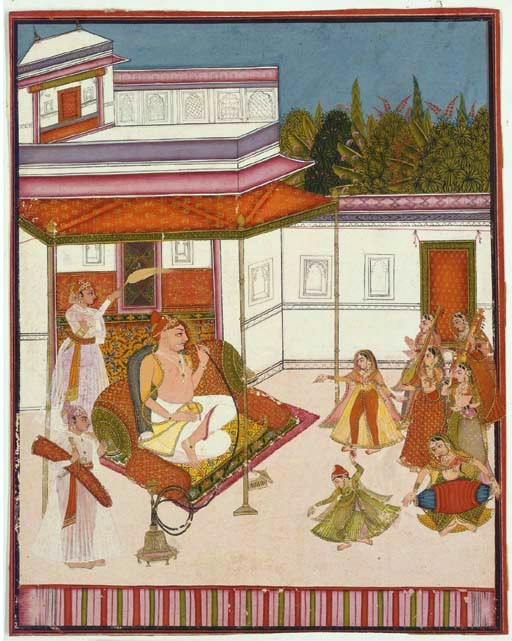
Maharao Umed Singh of Bundi

The Maharaja in his harem

Bundi State, founded by Hada Rao Devda (ruler of the Hada Chauhan dynasty), was a princely state in India. The former state was located in modern-day Rajasthan. It was ruled by Hada Chauhan Rajputs.

The last ruler of Bundi State signed the accession to join the Indian Union in 1949.

== History ==
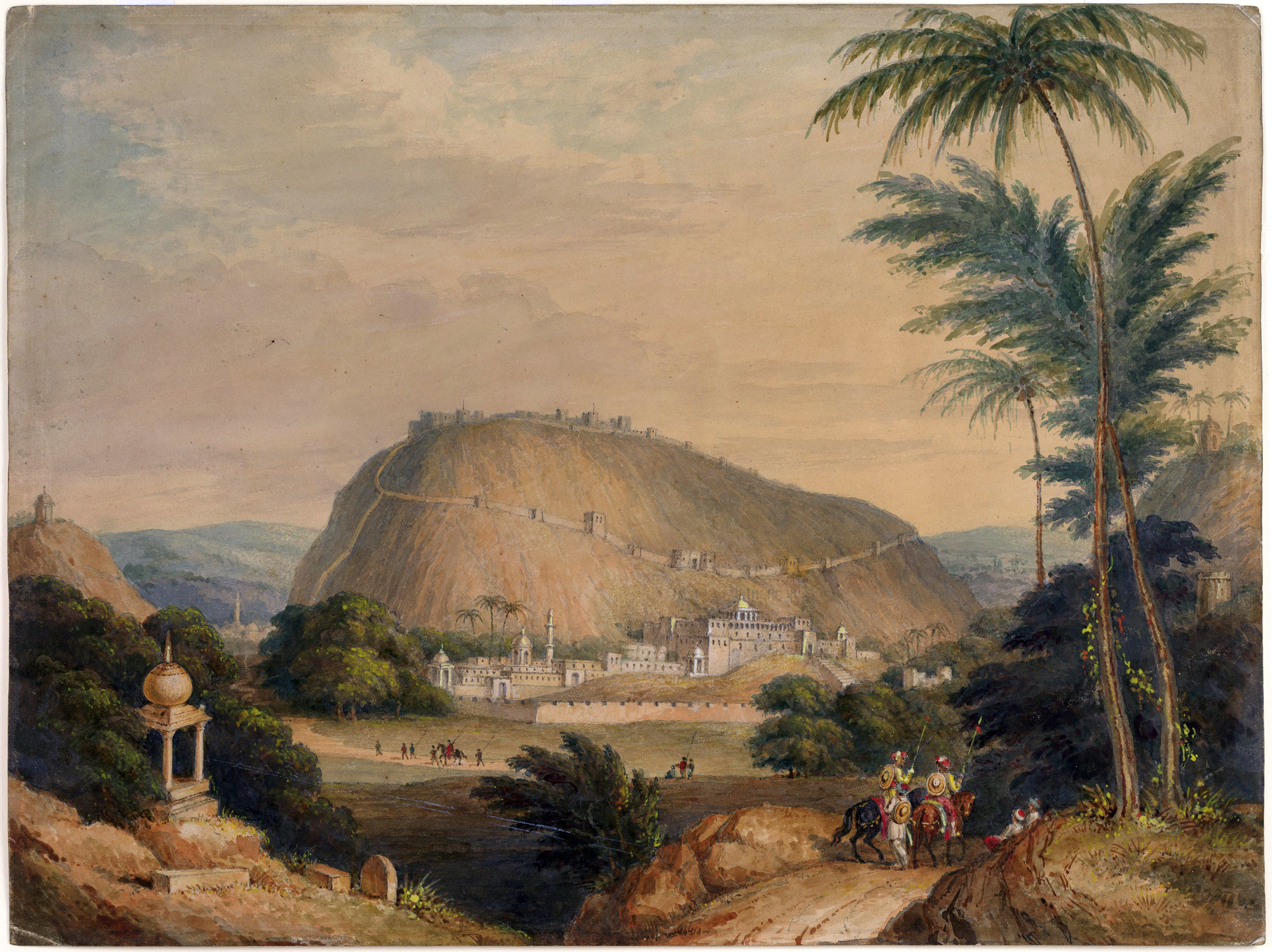
Watercolour painting of the town and pass of Bundi in Rajasthan, by an anonymous artist working in the British school, c. 1840.

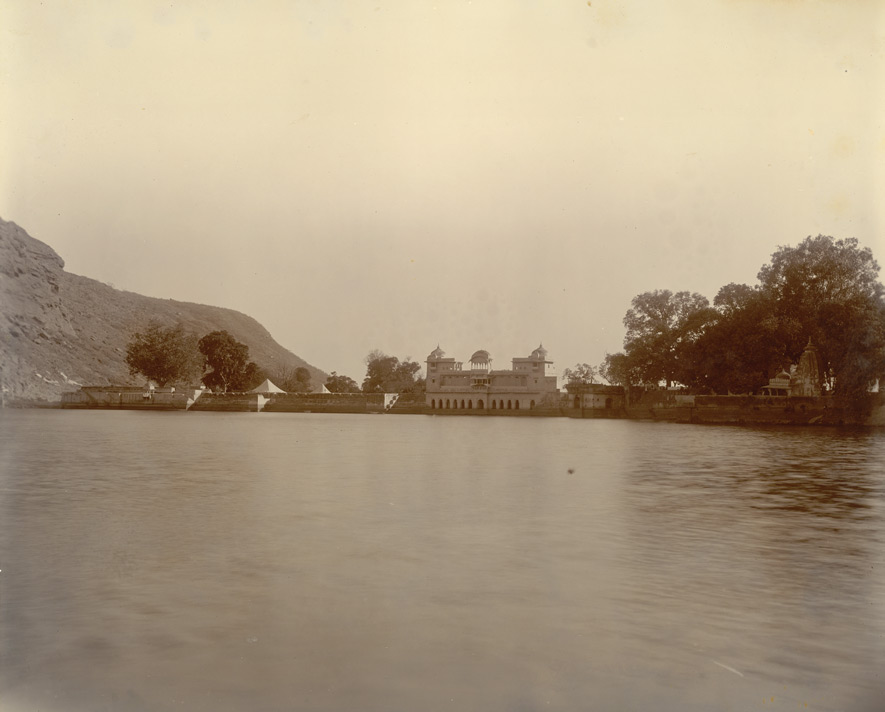
Sukh Niwas Palace on the edge of the Jait Sagar tank at Bundi, c. 1900

=== Medieval era ===
The region was governed by Rao Deva, who took over Bundi in 1241, renaming the surrounding area as Haravati or Haroti. For the next two centuries, the Hadas of Bundi were the vassals of the Sisodias of Mewar and ruled by the title of Rao until 1569, when Emperor Akbar conferred the title of Rao Raja upon Rao Surjan Singh after the surrender of Ranthambore Fort and his submission. In 1632, Rao Raja Chattar Sal became the ruler, he built the temple of Keshav Rai Temple at Keshoraipatan and Chathra Mahal at Bundi. He became king of Bundi after his grandfather Rao Ratan Singh, as his father Gopinath died while Ratan Singh was still ruling. He saw service with the Mughal forces as head of his Hada Chauhan Rajput troop and was considered an integral part of Mughal army by Shahjahan. Rao Chattar Sal was trusted by Dara Shikoh with governorship of Delhi, a rare privilege for a Hindu. He remained loyal to Shahjahan and Dara Shikoh during the rebellion of Aurangzeb despite many temptations and even threats from Aurangzeb. Rao Chattar Sal died fighting as the head of his Hada Rajput troops in the Battle of Samugarh in 1658 along with his youngest son Bharat Singh. Rao Bhao Singh (1658–1678) the eldest son of Chhattar Sal succeeded his father to the throne of Bundi. In 1707, Bahadur Shah I conferred the title of Maharao Raja upon Raja Budh Singh.

=== British era ===
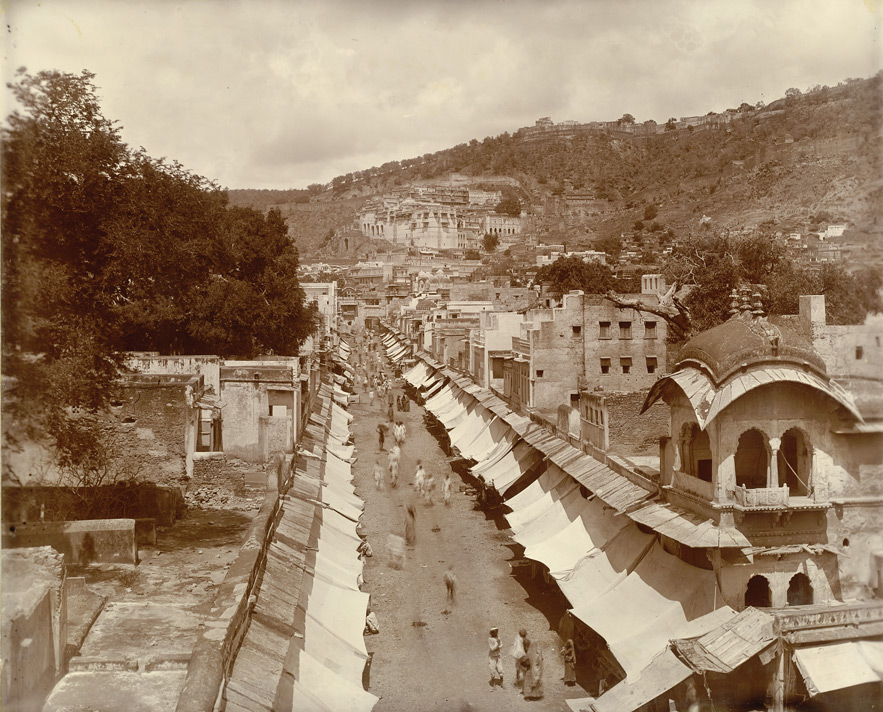
View looking along a bazaar at Bundi taken by Gunpatrao Abajee Kale, c.1900.

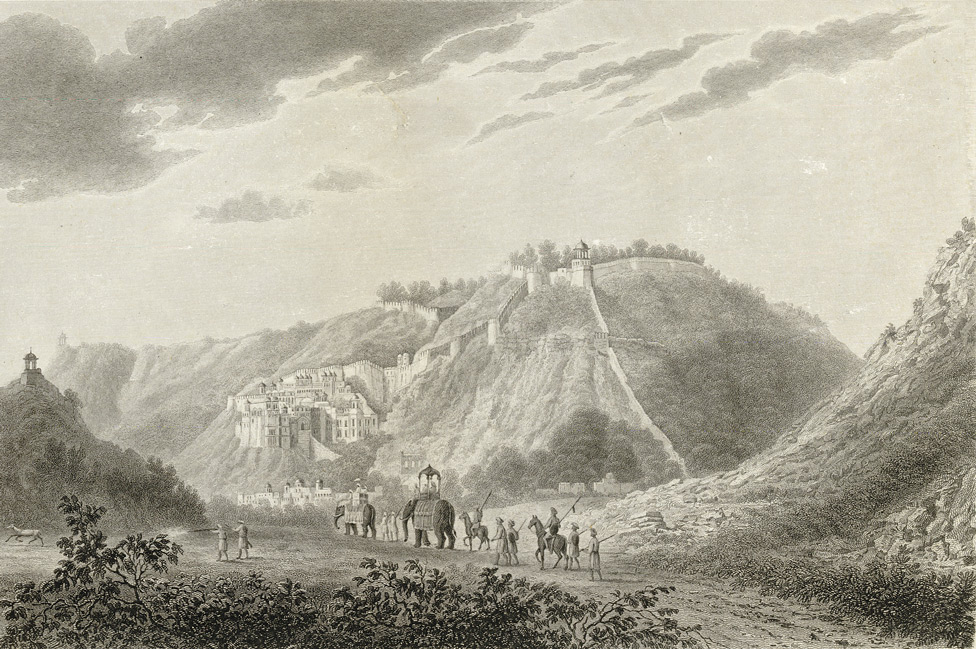
Palace and fortress at Bundi (1832)

In 1804 Rao Raja Bishan Singh (1773–1821) gave valuable assistance to Colonel Monson in his disastrous retreat before Holkar, in revenge for which the Maratha Empire and Pindaris continually ravaged his state and forced the kingdom to pay tribute up to 1817. Consequently, Bishan Singh made a subsidiary alliance with the British East India Company on 10 February 1818, which brought him under its protection. was responsible for the creation of the pleasure palace of Sukh Niwas on the outskirts of Bundi.

Maharao Raja Ram Singh (1821–89) grew up to be a much-respected ruler who initiated economic and administrative reforms and established schools for the teaching of Sanskrit. On the throne for 68 years, he was described as "the most conservative prince in [a] conservative Rajputana." His rule was popular and beneficial; and though during the mutiny of 1857 his attitude was equivocal, he continued to enjoy the confidence of the British, being created G.C.S.I. and a counselor of the empire in 1877 and C.I.E. in 1878. He was succeeded by his adopted son Raghubir Singh (1889–1927), who was made a K.C.S.I. in 1897 and a G.C.I.E. in 1901. His reign was blighted by two disastrous famines. Despite his best efforts at alleviation, the population of his kingdom was reduced from some 258,000 to 171,000 by 1901 due to death and emigration.

Maharao Bahadur Singh (1945–77) also supported the British and served in the Burma campaign, where he earned the Military Cross for his gallantry before succeeding to the throne. He was a guest at 1947 wedding of Princess Elizabeth and Philip, Duke of Edinburgh.

=== Accession to India ===
At the time of the partition of India in 1947, the British abandoned their suzerainty over the princely states, which were left to decide whether to remain independent or to accede to the newly independent Dominion of India or to Pakistan. The ruler of the state of Bundi decided to accede to India, which later became the Union of India. This brought the internal affairs of Bundi under the control of Delhi. Bundi's last ruler signed the accession to the Indian Union on 7 April 1949.

== Coat of arms ==
The coat of arms of Bundi was a shield depicting a warrior emerging from flames, signifying the creation-legend of the ruling Chouhan clan of Rajputs which was supposedly created from fire. The shield is flanked by cows representing dharma or righteousness; it is crowned by a hand holding a Katar.

== Rulers ==
The rulers of Bundi State belonged to Hada Chauhan dynasty of Rajputs.

=== Rao Raja ===
- 1554–1585: Surjan Singh
- 1585–1608: Bhoj Singh
- 1608–1632: Ratan Singh
- 1632–1658: Chattar Sal Singh
- 1658–1682: Bhao Singh
- 1682–1696: Anirudh Singh
- 1696–1707: Budh Singh (b. 16.. – d. 1739)

=== Maharao Raja ===
- 1707–1730: Budh Singh (b. 16.. – d. 1739)
- 1730–1749: Dalel Singh
- 1749–1770: Umaid Singh (1st time) (b. 1729 – d. 1804)
- 1770–1773: Ajit Singh (d. 1773)
- 1773–1804: Umaid Singh (2nd time) (s.a.)
- 1804 – 14 May 1821: Bishan Singh (b. 1773 – d. 1821)
- 14 May 1821 – 28 Mar 1889: Ram Singh (b. 1811 – d. 1889) (from 1 Jan 1877, Sir Ram Singh)
- 28 Mar 1889 – 26 Jul 1927: Raghubir Singh (b. 1869 – d. 1927)

(from 1 Jan 1894, Sir Raghubir Singh)

- 26 Jul 1927 – 23 Apr 1945: Ishwari Singh (b. 1893 – d. 1945) (from 11 May 1937, Sir Ishwari Singh)
- 23 Apr 1945 – 15 Aug 1949: Bahadur Singh (b. 1920 – d. 1977)

=== Titular ===
- : Bahadur Singh

=== Pretender ===
Name	Reign	Succession	Note	Reference
Ranjit Singh	1977–2010	Son of Bahadur Singh	Adopted by Bahadur Singh from Kapren	
Brigadier Bhupesh Singh, SC, VSM	2021–present	Installed by a Paag committee of local Rajputs. His succession was opposed by the kinsmen of Ranjit Singh.	Both claim to be the twenty-sixth Maharao.	
Vanshvardhan Singh	2 April 2022–present	Ishwari Singh had adopted Bahadur Singh and Kesri Singh, sons of Dhanurdhar Singh of Kapren. The former succeeded him as the Maharao Raja, and in turn, Bahadur’s son, Ranjit Singh, followed him on the throne. Twelve years after the death of Ranjit Singh, Vanshvardhan, a grandson of Kesri Singh, was chosen by the wider family and the former aristocracy to succeed him as the Maharao Raja, after a common Rajput, Bhupesh Singh, had been installed by local Rajputs. Jitendra Singh, maternal grandson of Bahadur Singh, and Brijraj Singh, the Maharao of Kotah, both supported his succession.	Both claim to be the twenty-sixth Maharao.	

== See also ==
- Kota State
- Maratha Empire
- Rajputana
- History of Rajasthan
