= Maharao Raja =

Indian princely title

Maharao Raja (lit. 'Supreme Raja or King'; feminine: Maharani) is a royal title in the Indian subcontinent of Sanskrit origin. It is one degree higher than Maharao. The word Maharao is a combination of Maha (meaning 'great') and Rao, which is a variation on Raja.

== History ==
The title of Maharao Raja was used by the rulers of Bundi and Kotah. Budh Singh of Bundi received this title from the eighth Mughal Emperor Bahadur Shah I in 1707. Bhim Singh of Kotah was granted the title of Maharao by the tenth Mughal Emperor Farrukhsiyar in 1713 and began to use it by combining it with the title of Raja, which was granted to his ancestor Madho Singh by the third Mughal Emperor Jahangir. This title was used by the rulers of Alwar for some time as well. The first ruler of Alwar to assume this title was Pratap Singh, and he began to use it in 1770, when he announced his independence from Jaipur.

When the title of Maharaja was conferred by the British Government as a hereditary distinction on Mangal Singh on 1 January 1889, from that date onwards the rulers of Alwar stopped using the title of Maharao Raja and began using the newly conferred title.

== Usage ==
=== Bundi ===
The ruler of Bundi bore the following styles and titles: His Highness Hadendra Shiromani Deo Sar Buland Rai Maharajadhiraj Maharao Raja Shri (personal name) Singhji Sahib Bahadur, Maharao Raja of Bundi.

=== Kotah ===
The ruler of Kotah bore the following styles and titles: His Highness Maharajadhiraj Maharaja Mahimahendra Maharao Raja Shri (personal name) Singhji Sahib Bahadur, Maharao Raja of Kotah. His consort bore the following: Her Highness Maharani (personal name) Sahiba.
