= Hada Chauhan =

Branch of the Chauhan community

Hada is a sub-branch of the Chauhan Rajputs that claim Agnivanshi descent. They live in Hadoti region of Rajasthan and it is claimed they ruled the states of Bundi, Jhalawar and Kota.

== History ==
Hada Chauhans conquered Asir in times of Ashtipal Chauhan, Asir was lost to raids of Mahmud Ghaznavi. Chandkarn was son of Asthipal and his sons, Hamirdeo Chauhan and Gambhir Chauhan were generals of Prithviraj Chauhan. Hamirgarh at Ranthambor was amongst the regional dominating powers before It was later overrun by the armies of Alauddin Khilji.
