= Mandhata Balaji Temple =

Coordinates: 25°27′10″N 75°38′43″E

- मांधाता बालाजी मंदिर
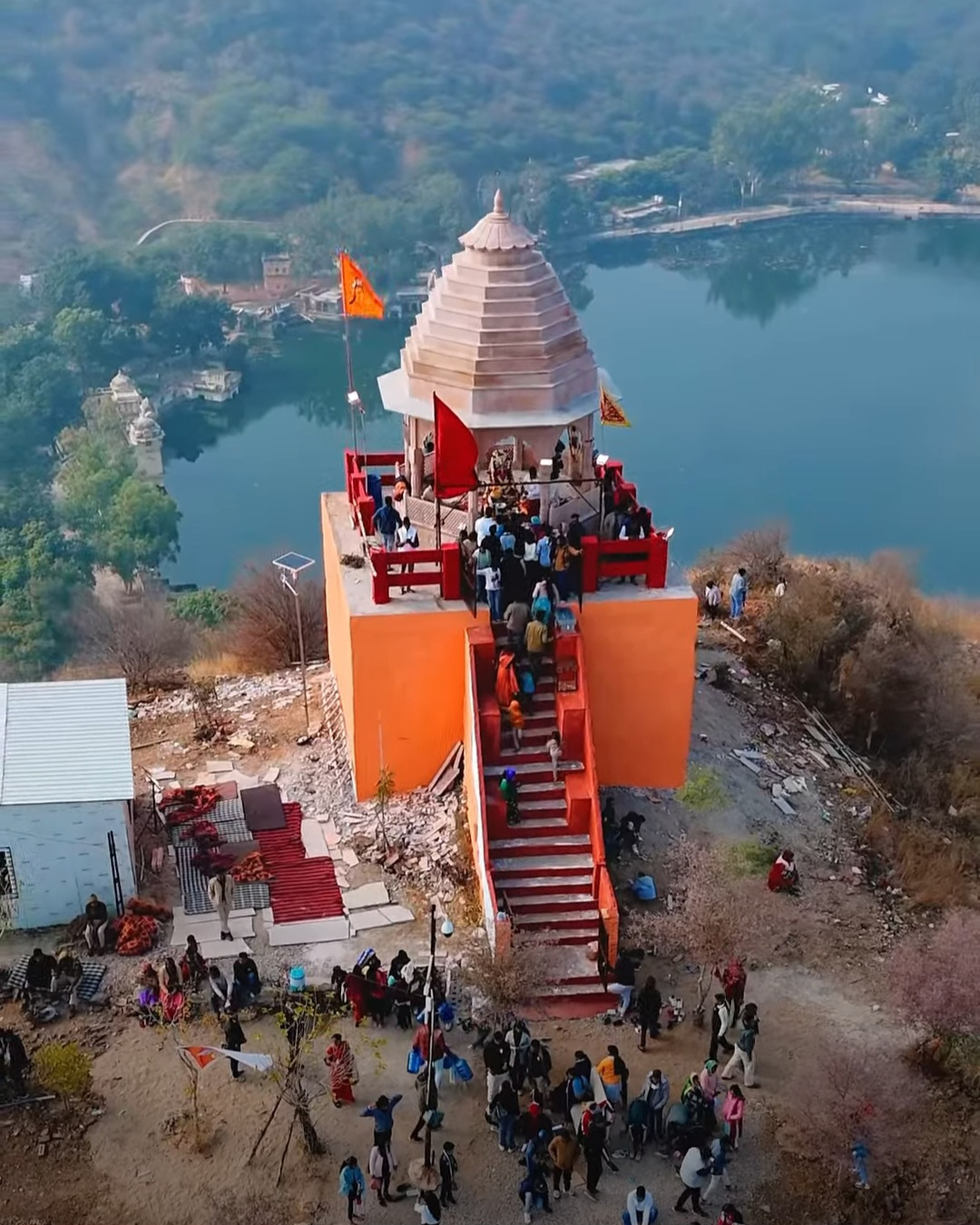
- A view of Mandhata Balaji Temple

- Location in Rajasthan

Religion
- Affiliation: Hinduism
- District: Bundi district
- Deity: Hanuman
- Festival: Annual fair during New Year period

Location
- Location: Tiger Hill, Bundi
- State: Rajasthan
- Country: India
- Interactive map of Mandhata Balaji Temple

Mandhata Balaji Temple (Hindi: मांधाता बालाजी मंदिर) is a historic Hindu temple located atop Tiger Hill of Arvalli mountain Range in the Bundi district of Rajasthan, India. The temple venerates Hindu deity Hanuman and attracts devotees, especially around New Year, when a four-day fair is celebrated.

== Geography ==
Mandhata Balaji Temple is situated atop Tiger Hill in Bundi, Rajasthan, and is geographically near to Jait Sagar Lake. The temple overlooks the northern stretch of Jait Sagar and lies a short distance uphill from the heritage palace of Sukh Mahal, which was once visited by Rudyard Kipling. The area is part of the Aravalli foothills and offers a panoramic view of the Bundi city.

The approach to the temple is via a forested trail, passing through a reserve area under the jurisdiction of the Forest Department of Rajasthan.

== History and significance ==
The temple is located near a chhatri (cenotaph), which is sometimes associated in local narratives with Bundi royal history, although no official documentation confirms this.. In January 2018, the local administration initially prohibited worship due to communal sensitivity, invoking Section 144. This led to protests and communal tension.

Following public pressure, the government allowed limited worship activities by the forest department.

During the unrest, the then district collector of Bundi received death threats, which were investigated by local authorities.

== Cultural and religious events ==
Each year, a four-day religious fair is held around the New Year, and thousands of devotees come. Local legends associate the site with miraculous occurrences, and rituals include Hanuman Chalisa recitation, Deepdan, and bhajan gatherings.

== Administration and access ==
Tiger Hill falls under forest department jurisdiction. Daily rituals are performed by forest personnel under a legal compromise. During peak periods, the district administration manages security and crowd control.

== See also ==
- Bundi
- Taragarh Fort, Bundi
- Dobra Mahadev Temple
- Charbhuja Nath Temple
- Bundi Utsav
