= Sukh Mahal =

Palace in Bundi, Rajasthan, India

- Sukh Niwas Mahal
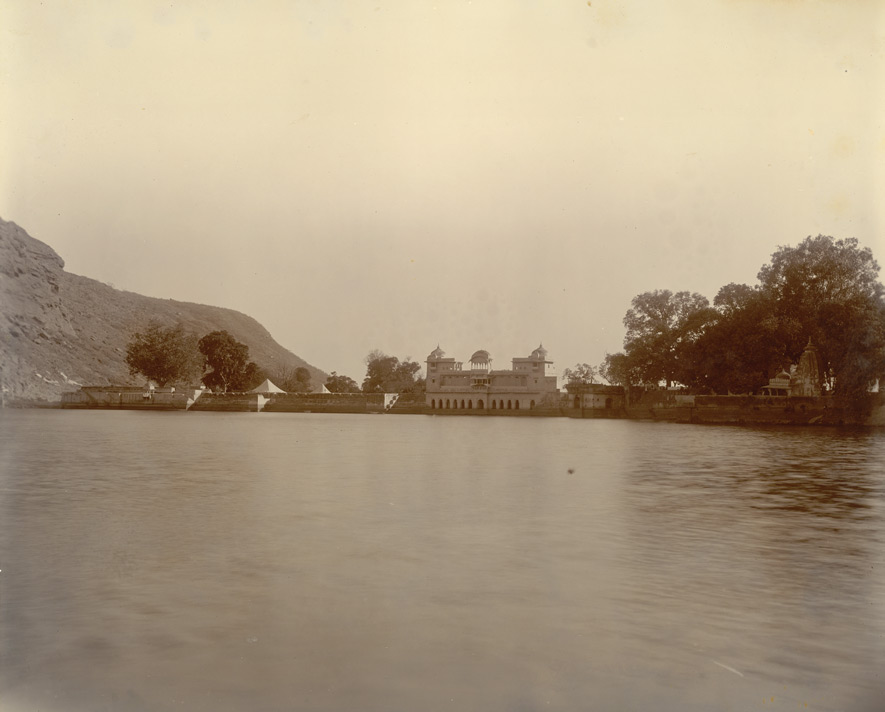
- A view of Sukh Mahal
- Interactive map of Sukh Mahal
- Location: Bundi, Rajasthan
- Coordinates: 25.4545°N 75.6444°E
- Type: Palace
- Basin countries: India
- Built: 1776 A.D.

Sukh Mahal, also known as Sukh Niwas Mahal, is a historic palace located in Bundi, a district in the Indian state of Rajasthan. The palace is often associated with Rudyard Kipling, who is believed to have drawn inspiration from its beauty for his famous work, "Kim (novel)".

== History ==
Sukh Mahal, translating to "Palace of Pleasure", was built during the reign of Rao Raja Vishnu Singh in the early 18th century, under the supervision of his Diwan and architect Sukhram in 1776 A.D. The palace served as a summer retreat for the rulers of Bundi. Over the years, it has also been a place of residence for visiting dignitaries and guests of the royal family.

== Architecture ==
The architecture of Sukh Mahal is a blend of Mughal and Rajput styles. The palace is built with white marble and features carved pillars, chhatris, and ornate ceilings.

Sukh Mahal is located on the banks of Jait Sagar Lake. The lake plays a crucial role in its cooling system. The palace is designed to allow the cool breeze from the lake to circulate through its corridors, making it an ideal summer residence.

== The Rudyard Kipling connection ==
Sukh Mahal holds a special place in literary history due to its association with the British author Rudyard Kipling. During his visit to Bundi in the late 19th century, Kipling stayed at Sukh Mahal and was captivated by its charm and beauty. The palace and its surroundings inspired parts of his novel "Kim", particularly the scenes depicting the life of the protagonist in a similar setting.

== Present day ==
Today, Sukh Mahal is a popular tourist attraction in Bundi. The palace is maintained by the Archaeological Survey of India (ASI) and has been preserved as a heritage site. Visitors can explore the palace's various rooms, enjoy the scenic views of Jait Sagar Lake, and gain insights into the regal lifestyle of Bundi's former rulers.

== Tourism and cultural significance ==
Sukh Mahal is located near other historic sites such as the Taragarh Fort, Chaurasi Khambon ki Chhatri and the Raniji Ki Baori (Queen's Stepwell). The palace is especially popular during the Bundi Utsav, an annual festival that celebrates the town's culture with music, dance, and traditional performances.

== Accessibility ==
Sukh Mahal is easily accessible from the town of Bundi, which is well-connected by road and rail to major cities in Rajasthan. The nearest major airport is in Jaipur, approximately 210 kilometers away. Visitors can hire local guides to learn more about the palace's history and architectural features.

== See also ==
- Taragarh Fort, Bundi
- Jait sagar Lake
- Phool Sagar Palace
