= Kajali Teej Mela =

Indian festival

Kajali Teej Mela कजली तीज मेला
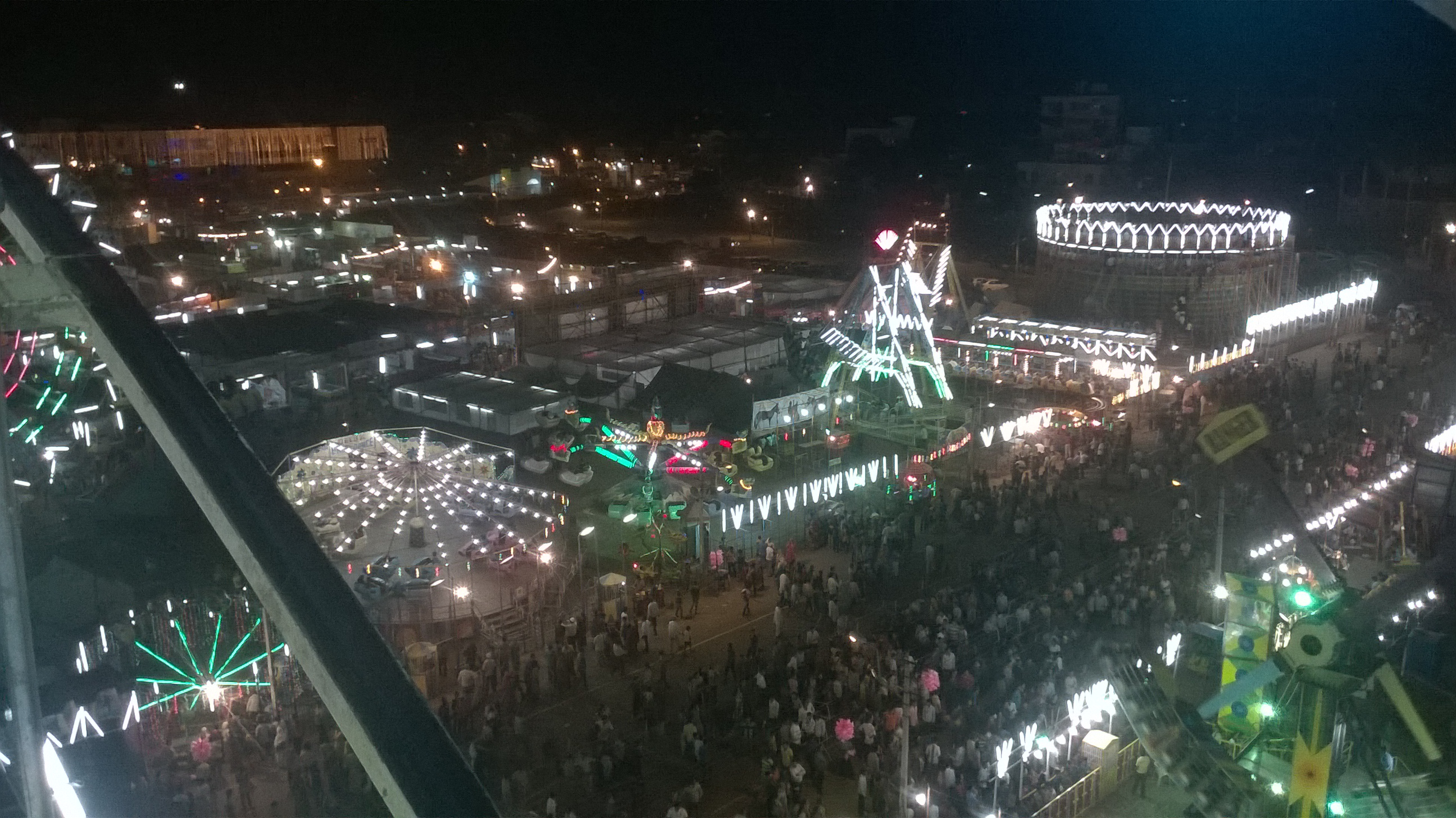
- Status: Active
- Genre: Fair
- Venue: Kumbha Stadium, Bundi
- Locations: Bundi, Rajasthan
- Coordinates: 25.430691°N 75.64085°E
- Country: India
- Previous event: 2023
- Next event: 2024
- Organiser: Municipal Council, Bundi
- Sponsors: Government of Rajasthan

Kajali Teej Mela is an annual fair celebrated in the historic city of Bundi, located in the Hadoti region of the Indian state of Rajasthan. The fair is organised during the Hindu month of Shravan (July–August), specifically on the third day of the bright half of the lunar month, known as Teej.

This festival is dedicated to Hindu Goddess Teej mata, a synonym name of Goddess Parvati, commemorating her union with God Shiva. In this event along with procession of Goddess Teej Mata, a 15-day fair is also organised in Bundi city, in which businesspeople and artisans from all over the state and the country come to Bundi to set up their shops, with many cultural programs also organised. Millions of people from the southern districts of Rajasthan visit this fair.

== History ==
It is said that in the princely state of Bundi, Raja Balwant Singh, king of Bundi Ka Gothra, when talking to his friend about the grand procession for Teej in Jaipur decided to bring the same idol of Teej to Bundi. When the Teej procession was going on in Jaipur, Raja Balwant Singh attacked and looted the idol of Teej and brought it to Bundi and after 15 days, Teej started being celebrated in Bundi with royal pomp. Since then, the festival of Kajali Teej has been celebrated in Bundi.

It is also said that at that time the idol of Teej which was taken out of Amber Fort in Jaipur was made of gold. The king had looted it and brought it to Bundi. After that, the procession of the impersonated idol of Teej Mata started taking place in Jaipur. Earlier the royal people used to come out on Bundi Teej procession, later after democracy was established, the local municipal body started organising this event.

== Celebrations ==
The Kajali Teej Mela in Bundi is characterised by vibrant festivities, marked by rituals, music, dance, and a bustling fair.

=== Traditional procession ===
One of the highlights of the festival is the traditional procession, locally known as Shobha Yatra, which features beautifully adorned idols of Teej Mata mounted on elaborately decorated palanquins. The procession winds its way through the narrow lanes of Bundi, accompanied by enthusiastic chants, devotional songs, and the rhythmic beats of traditional musical instruments.

=== Food and craft bazaars ===
During the fair, the streets come alive with a myriad of stalls selling colourful bangles, traditional attire, handicrafts, jewellry, and delectable local delicacies at Kumbha Stadium. The fair offers an opportunity for attendees to experience Rajasthan’s culinary traditions. The food items available represent various regions of Rajasthan, including Mewar, Marwar, Dhundhar, Hadoti, and Braj, and are showcased at the Food Bazaar.

=== Cultural performances ===
The fair features performances of traditional Rajasthani folk music, dance, and theater at Kumbha Stadium in the city of Bundi. Several artists from across the region come together to showcase their talent with their vibrant performances.

=== Kavi Sammelan ===
Kavi Sammelan is a gathering of poets in the Hindi Belt of northern India. In this fair Kavi Sammelan is organised in both Rajasthani and the Hindi language. Poets from different parts of country come and give their performance here.

=== Celebrity performances ===
Prominent celebrities are also invited by the organisers every year. In 2023 Sapna Chaudhary, a celebrity Haryanvi dancer and Taarak Mehta Ka Ooltah Chashmah fame Priya Ahuja were invited to perform.

== Significance ==
In Bundi, Kajali Teej holds particular importance as it is deeply ingrained in the local customs and traditions. Women of all ages eagerly anticipate this festival, as it not only provides them with an opportunity to adorn themselves in traditional attire but also to participate in various cultural and religious rituals.

== See also ==
- Bundi Utsav
- Taragarh Fort, Bundi
