= Malan Masi Balaji Temple =

Malan Masi Balaji
- मालन मासी बालाजी
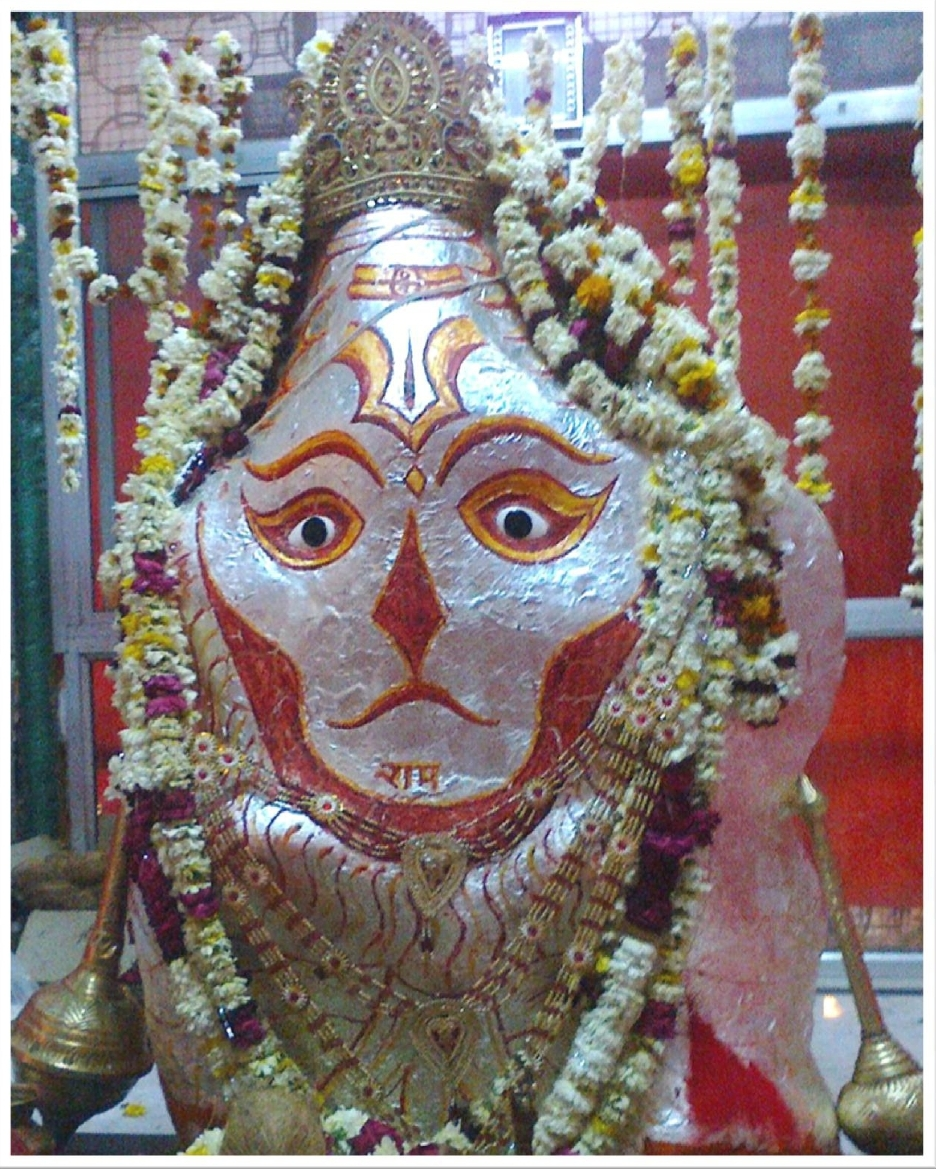
- Idol of Hanuman at the main shrine

- Location in Rajasthan

Religion
- Affiliation: Hinduism
- District: Bundi
- Deity: Hanuman
- Festivals: Hanuman Jayanti, Navratri
- Governing body: Malan Masi Balaji Samiti

Location
- State: Rajasthan
- Country: India
- Interactive map of Malan Masi Balaji
- Coordinates: 25.44°N 75.64°E

Architecture
- Type: Hindu architecture

Malan Masi Balaji Temple is an ancient Hindu temple located in Bundi, Rajasthan, India. The temple is dedicated to the deity Hanuman, also known by his childhood name Balaji, and is considered a significant place of worship in the region. It attracts thousands of devotees, especially on Tuesdays and Saturdays.

== Location ==
The temple is the closest to the old city of Bundi, which is outside the Taragarh Fort of Bundi. It is located at approximately 1 km from District H.Q. of Bundi district.

== History ==
The temple is one of the ancient temples of the city. According to the locals, many years ago a group of saints was passing near the Malanmasi Balaji temple location. They stayed here to rest. They were looking for a rock to cook food on it. They found a stone but on cleaning it, saw thatit was resembling deity Hanuman, and the group of saints installed that stone as an idol of Hanuman at this place. A woman named Masi, who belongs to Mali caste used to come here to collect cow dung. While leaving, the saints asked that woman to worship the idol. This is how the temple got its name Malan Masi Balaji.

== Architecture and idol ==
The temple architecture follows the Indian architecture style, featuring intricate carvings. The idol of deity Hanuman is adorned with Sindoor (vermilion) and Vark. The temple premises also include smaller temples dedicated to other Hindu deities such as Rama, Lakshmana, Sita and Shiva.

== Festivals and rituals ==
The temple hosts various religious events, with Tuesdays and Saturdays being special days for worship. Devotees participate in Bhajans, Arti, and recitations of the Sundara kand from Ramcharitmanas. Special festivals like Hanuman Jayanti and Navratri are celebrated and thousands of devotees visits.

== See also ==
- Charbhuja Nath Temple, Bundi
