= Bundi TV Tower =

Coordinates: 25.4528°N 75.6337°E

- TV Tower, Bundi
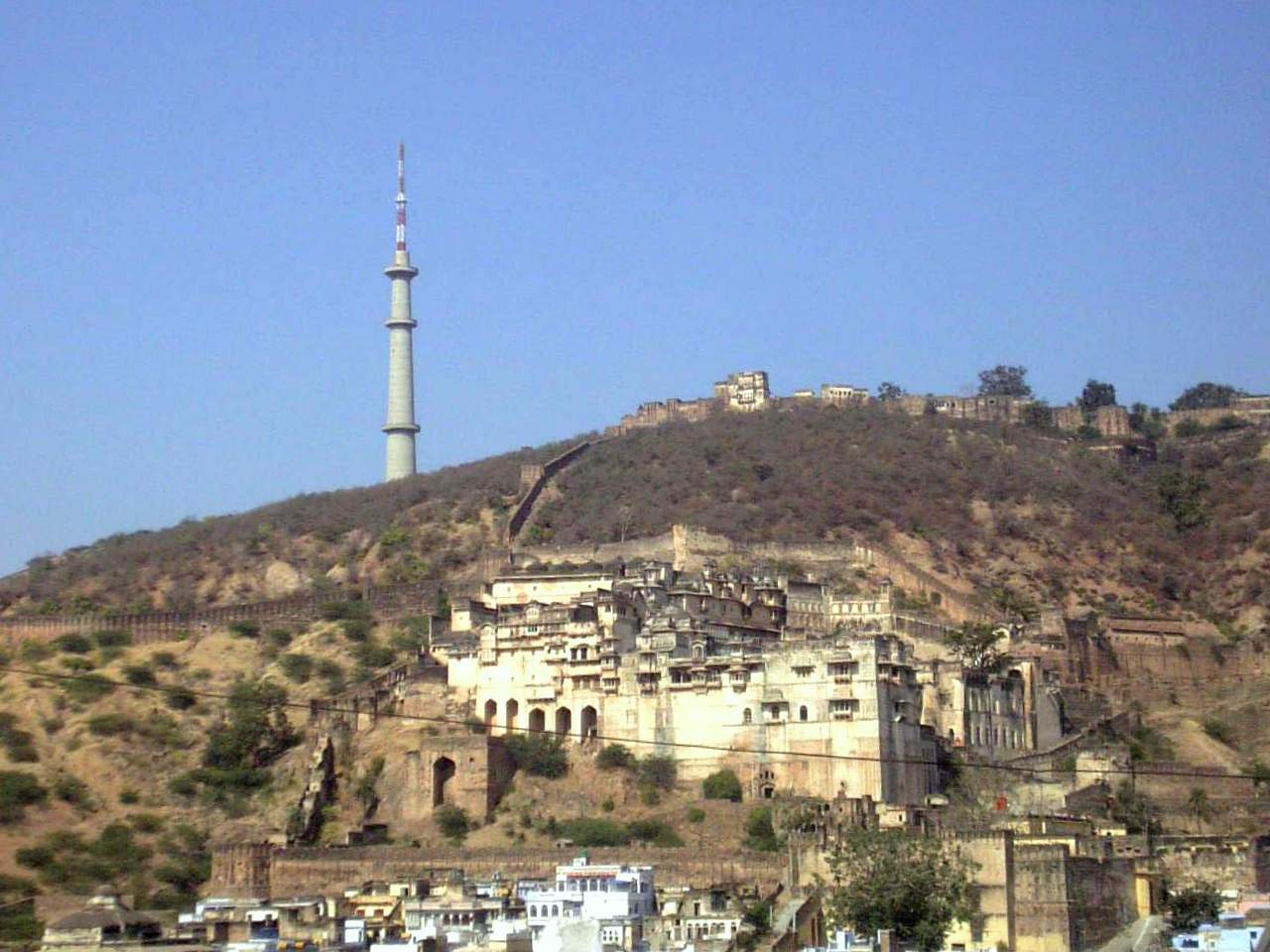
- View of Bundi TV Tower situated above Taragarh Fort
- Interactive map of the Bundi TV Tower area

General information
- Type: TV and Radio(FM) Broadcast
- Location: Bundi, Rajasthan
- Inaugurated: 1993
- Governing body: Prasar Bharti

The Bundi TV Tower, also known as TV Tower, Bundi, is a high-power transmitter tower for Doordarshan and All India Radio, located in the city of Bundi, Rajasthan, India. The tower serves as a vital hub for broadcasting television and FM radio signals across the area.

== History ==
The construction of the Bundi TV Tower dates back to 1993, a testament to the rapid advancements in telecommunications technology during that era. It was designed to broadcast Doordarshan channels such as DD National and DD Metro.

== Design and architecture ==
The tower's structure comprises a lattice framework, which not only enhances its visual appeal but also ensures stability against external forces. The main structure is made of reinforced cement concrete.

== See also ==
- Telecommunication Tower
- Bundi
- Taragarh Fort
