= Dobra Mahadev Temple =

Coordinates: 25°27′38″N 75°37′59″E

- डोबरा महादेव मन्दिर

Religion
- Affiliation: Hinduism
- District: Bundi
- Deity: Shiva
- Festival: Ashtami of Shravana, Maha Shivaratri

Location
- State: Rajasthan
- Country: India
- Interactive map of Dobra Mahadev Temple

Architecture
- Style: Hindu architecture
- Established: 1400 AD

Dobra Mahadev Temple (Hindi: डोबरा महादेव मन्दिर, romanized: Dobara Mahaadev Mandir) is a Hindi temple located in Bundi, a town in Rajasthan, India. Dedicated to Shiva, it holds great cultural importance for the local community and attracts thousands of visitors.

== History ==
The temple of Dobra Mahadev is situated in a pass of hills in Aravalli Range near Taragarh Fort, Bundi, covered by the dense forests of the Ramgarh Vishdhari Wildlife Sanctuary. It is 1 kilometre (0.62 mi) from the closest village, Dalelpura. It is said to have been established 700 years ago during India's medieval period. It was named after the stepwell present inside, called a dabra, supposedly filled with holy water gathered from 24 other temples.

The temple is built in the Hindu architectural style. Apart from the idol of Panchamukha Mahadeva, idols of Charbhujanath and Balaji can also be found inside, said to be between 500 and 600 years old. The idol of Balaji is supposedly made from cow dung. There is also a living samadhi of a saint here.

== Religious significance ==
Dobra Mahadev Temple holds great religious significance for local devotees of Shiva. It serves as a place of worship and pilgrimage, where thousands of devotees come to offer prayers and seek blessings for various aspects of their lives.

A fair is held every year on the first Ashtami of Shravana, during which thousands of people come. Every Monday and especially in Shravana, a large number of devotees visit Dobra Mahadev.

Part of the idol of Charbhujanath was stolen from the temple sometime in January 2016, having been broken off at the feet by the thieves. The statue was later recovered, but was found in a ruined condition. In June 2022, thieves once again stole the idol of Charbhujanath, killing a temple priest in the process. The same month, the idol was recovered by local police, although the thieves still have not been caught.

== See also ==
- Taragarh Fort, Bundi
- Bundi TV Tower
