= Phool Sagar Palace =

- फूल सागर महल
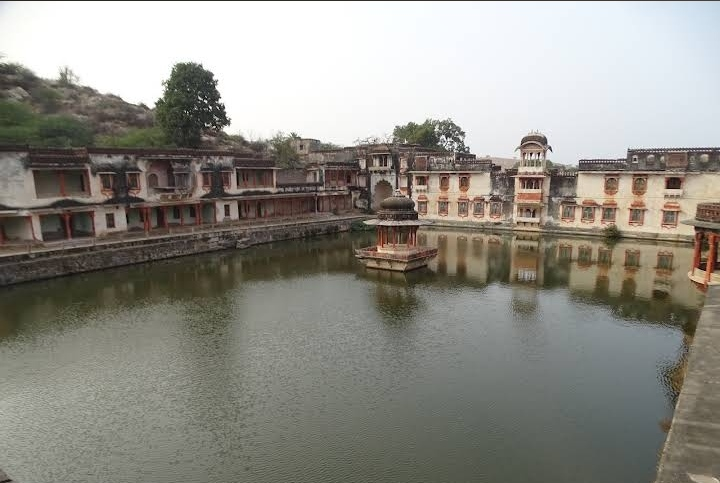
- A view of Phool Sagar Palace

General information
- Type: Palace
- Town or city: Bundi
- Country: India
- Coordinates: 25.4688°N 75.6054°E

Phool Sagar Palace is a historic palace located about 5 km to the north-west of the city of Bundi, Rajasthan, India.This Palace was built by Hada Chauhan King Rao Raja Bhoj Singh's deputy queen Phool lata in the first half of the 17th century and hence it was named Phool Sagar Palace (Flower's Sea Palace).

== Architecture ==
The palace is an example of a fusion between Rajput and European architectural influences. There is a big water tank called as Kund on its banks, a Chhatri in the middle and two small palaces.

== Phool Sagar Lake ==
Adjacent to the palace is Phool Sagar Lake, an artificial reservoir is present.

== See also ==
- Taragarh Fort
