= Bundi Utsav =

Bundi Utsav बूंदी उत्सव
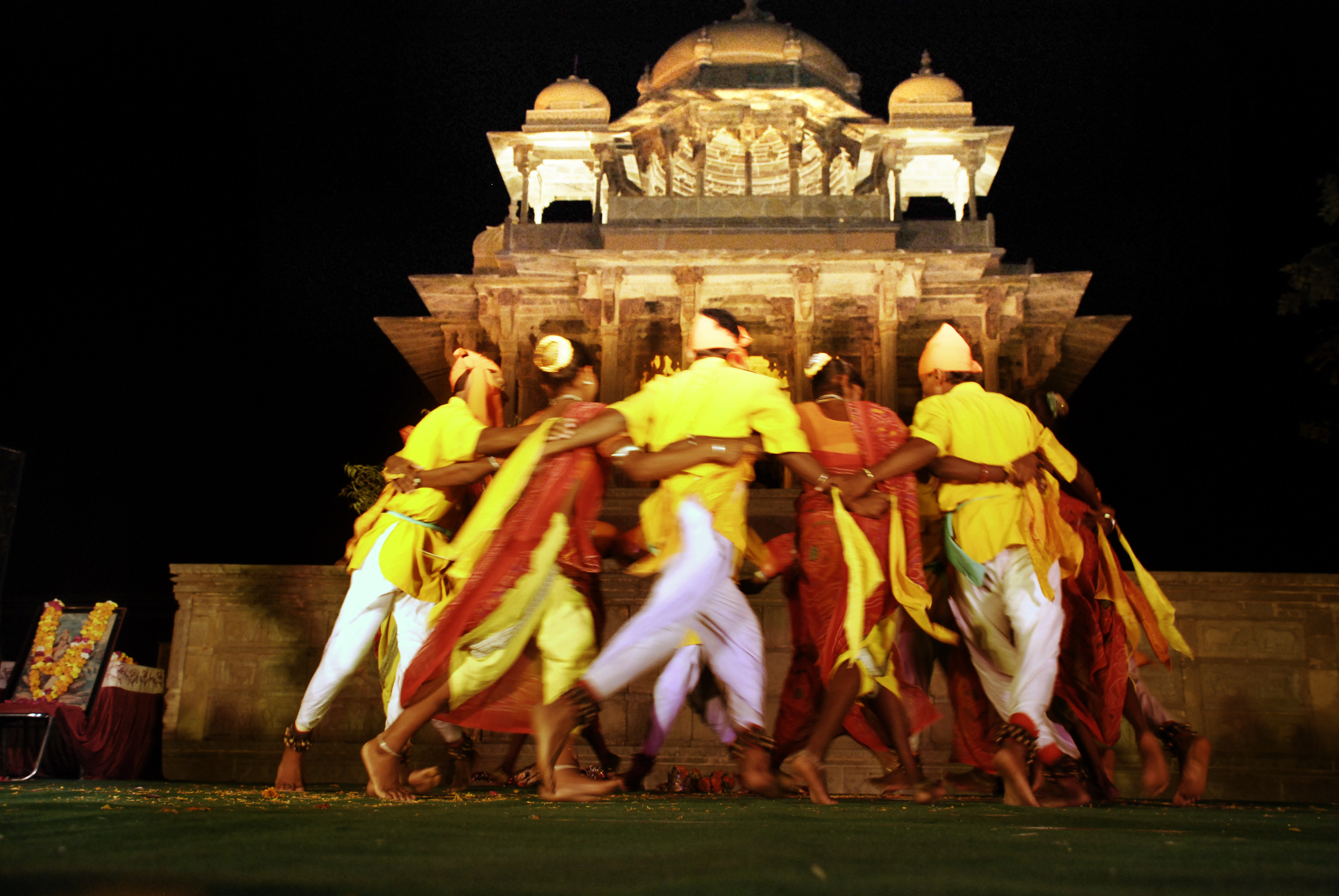
- Folk Dance in Bundi Utsav
- Status: active
- Genre: fair, public gathering
- Begins: 1996
- Frequency: annually
- Venue: Taragarh Fort, Bundi, Jait Sagar Lake, Nawal Sagar Lake, Raniji ki Baori, Chaurasi Khambon ki Chhatri, Bundi
- Locations: Bundi, Rajasthan
- Country: India
- Years active: 24
- Previous event: 2023
- Next event: 2024
- Organiser: Department of Tourism, Rajasthan
- Sponsors: Government of Rajasthan
- Website: https://utsav.gov.in/view-event/bundi-festival-1

Bundi Utsav, or Bundi Festival, is an annual cultural and tourism festival celebrated in the city of Bundi, located in the Hadoti region of Rajasthan, India. The festival teaches about Rajasthan and Bundi's cultural heritage, traditional art, and historical significance. It typically takes place in November, during the Hindu calendar month of Kartika, and lasts three days. Both domestic and international tourists attend the festival.

== History ==
Initial preparations for Bundi Utsav began in 1995, with public input, and the first annual festival was held the following year. The festival was conceived by Bundi District Head Rajmata Daulat Kanwar Ji (who held the role between 1995 and 2000 on behalf of the BJP) and Bundi District Collector Madhukar Ji Gupta, who wanted the event to deepen the connection of local residents to their heritage. Bundi Utsav has gained popularity over the years and is an event in Rajasthan's cultural calendar. As the festival attracts tourists from around the world, it is considered as a significant contributor to the economic development of Bundi city and the surrounding areas.

The festival was cancelled in 2020 due to the COVID-19 pandemic.

== Activities ==
Bundi Utsav offers a range of cultural events and activities.

=== Cultural events ===
Processions take place in the streets of Bundi, with colourful decorations. They include decorated camels, horses and elephants with traditional attire and accessories. These processions are intended to celebrate the historical regal heritage of Rajasthan and contribute to a festive atmosphere. The procession begins with worship of Lord Ganesha at the Taragarh Fort in Bundi city.

A marketplace is set up during the festival, offering handcrafted items, textiles, jewelry, and pottery. It is held at the Government Senior Secondary School in Bundi. Visitors can purchase locally-made Rajasthani handicrafts from artisans.

The festival includes performances of traditional Rajasthani folk music, dance, and theater at the Chaurasi Khambon ki Chhatri in Bundi city.

The festival includes stalls with local Rajasthani cuisine, including traditional dishes such as Katt Bafla, gatte ki sabzi, Danamethi ki Sabzi, and Kadke.

=== Tourist activities ===
Bundi Utsav also includes various tourist-oriented activities such as heritage walks, guided tours of historical monuments, and competitive activities such as tug-of-war, a mustache competition, a turban tying competition, a pot race, a horse race and a camel race. On the last day of Bundi Utsav, a cultural safari is organised to educate foreign tourists about rural Indian culture. The "village safari" takes visitors to Theekarda village to show them the rural lifestyle, attire and culture.

=== Deepdaan ===
The festival includes Deepdan, an event during which earthen lamps are lit and set afloat on the waters of Nawal Sagar Lake, located in Bundi city. Deepdan has tended to draw thousands of citizens.

=== Painting workshop ===
The festival includes a drawing and painting workshop also held at Sukh Mahal located on the banks of Jait Sagar Lake in the city of Bundi.

== See also ==
- Bundi
- Taragarh Fort, Bundi
- Jait Sagar Lake
- Nawal Sagar Lake
- Rajasthan Diwas
