= Rajasthan Day =

Celebration of Rajasthan state's founding

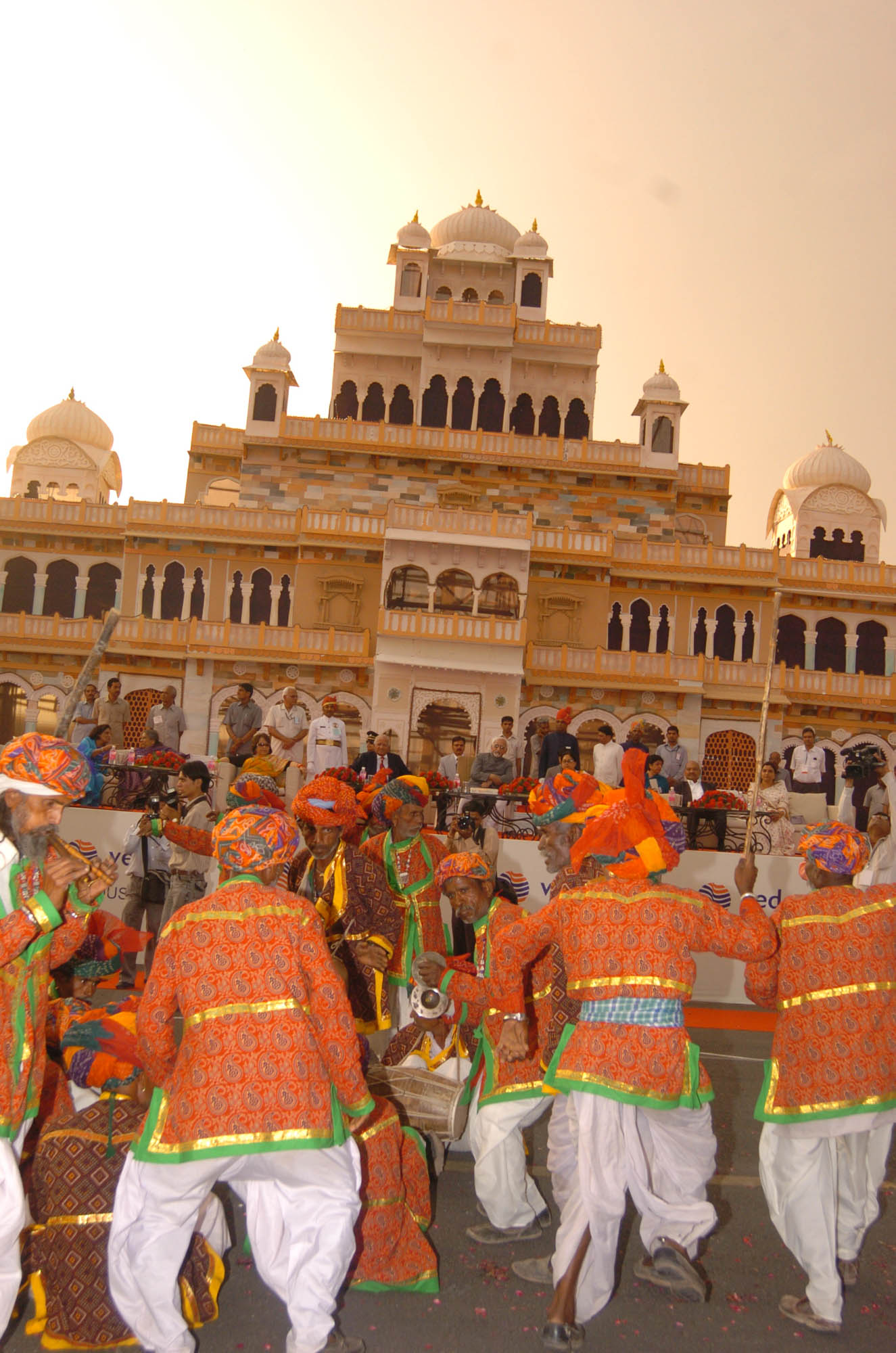
- Rajasthani folk dance at Albert Hall Museum, Jaipur
- Official name: Hindi: राजस्थान दिवस
- Observed by: People of Rajasthan
- Significance: Mark the formation of the state of Rajasthan
- Frequency: Annually
- First time: March 30, 1949

Rajasthan Day, also known as the Foundation Day of Rajasthan, is celebrated annually on 30 March (On 19 March in 2026 ). On this day, many cultural activities took place in Rajasthan's capital Jaipur, and at every district headquarters in Rajasthan. On March 30, 1949 the princely states of Jodhpur, Jaipur, Jaisalmer and Bikaner were merged to form the Greater Rajasthan Union. The day has been celebrated on that day ever since.

== History ==
Rajasthan was earlier known as Rajputana and was formed by merging 19 princely states and was named "Rajasthan", literally "place of kings" because many kings and emperors ruled there before independence. The integration of Rajasthan took place in 7 phases:

1. 'Matsya Union' with the merger of the princely states of Alwar, Bharatpur, Dholpur and Karauli on 17 March 1948.
2. 'Rajasthan Union' with the merger of Tonk, Bundi, Kota, Jhalawar, Pratapgarh, Dungapur, Banswara, Kishangarh, and Shahapura on 25 March 1948.
3. 'United States of Rajasthan' with the merger of the Udaipur state on 18 April 1948.
4. On March 30, 1949, 'Greater Rajasthan' was formed by the merger of the princely states of Jodhpur, Jaipur, Jaisalmer and Bikaner. This is called Rajasthan Foundation Day. Sardar Vallabhbhai Patel was actively involved in this merger.
5. 'United States of Greater Rajasthan' with the merger of Matsya Union with Greater Rajasthan on 15 May 1949.
6. 'United Rajasthan' with the addition of the princely state of Sirohi on 26 January 1950.
7. Final reorganisation of Rajasthan as per the States Reorganisation Act of 1956.

== Events ==
On this day many programs are organized by Rajasthan Tourism Department. The main center of these programs is Jaipur.

=== Food and Craft fair ===
The Food and Craft fair takes place at Shilp Gram in Jawahar Kala Kendra. The fair offers an opportunity for attendees to experience Rajasthan’s culinary traditions, accompanied by folk performances. The food items represent regions of Rajasthan, including Mewar, Marwar, Dhundhar, Hadoti, and Brij.

=== Craft bazaar ===
The Craft bazaar showcases handicrafts, art forms, prints and textiles, pottery items, embroidered fabrics, intricately designed carpets, and metal and wood works from various regions of Rajasthan. They are a major attraction for visitors and residents.

=== Performances ===
The Chari dance and Puppet show are held at Jal Mahal. Tribal dance and folk song performances take place at Albert Hall. Ravan Hatta and Khartal Vadan are performed at Amber Fort. Artists from various parts of the country participate in these cultural performances.

== See also ==
- Bundi Utsav
