= Charbhuja Nath Temple =

- चारभुजा नाथ मंदिर
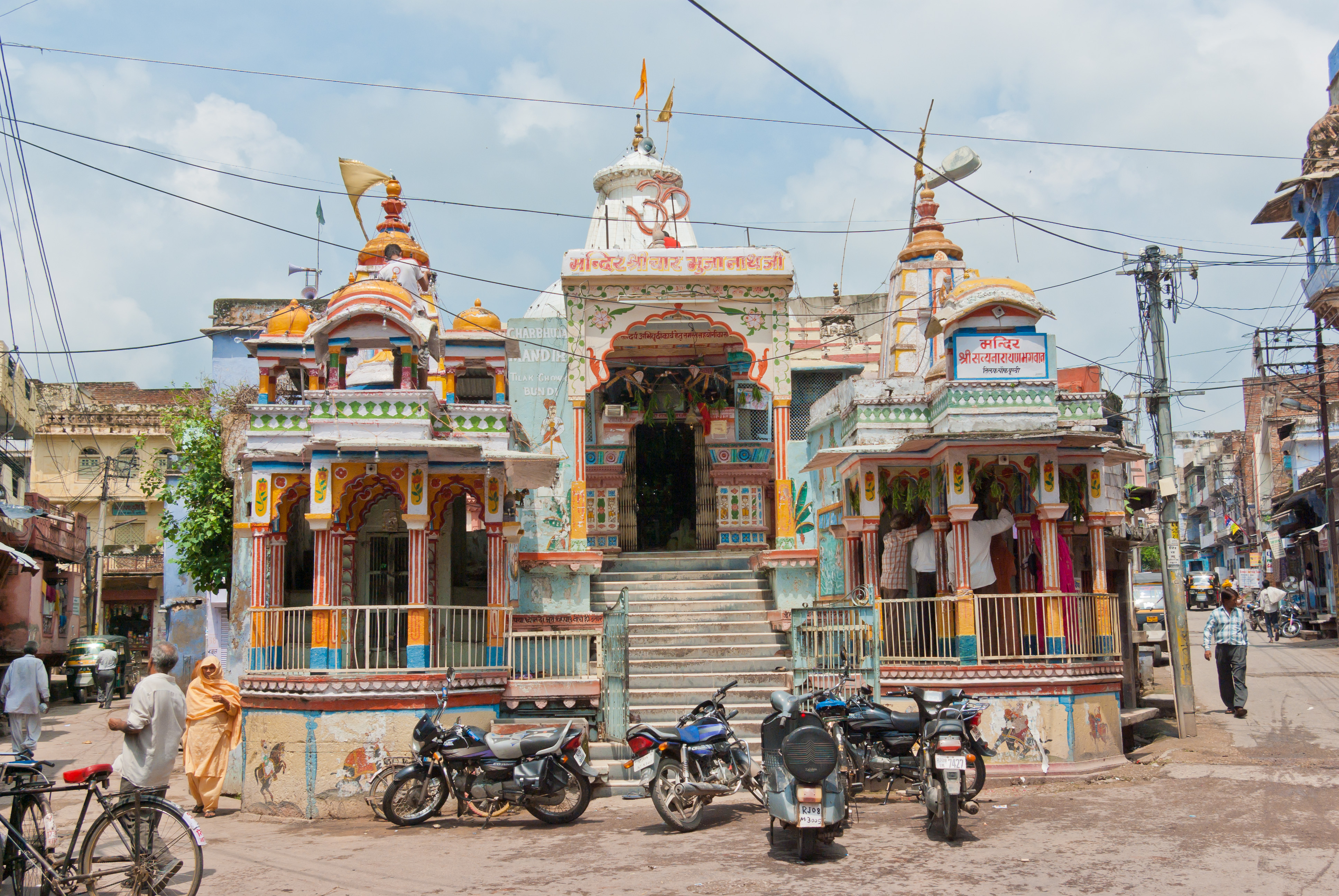
- front view of Charbhuja Nath temple

- Location in Rajasthan

Religion
- Affiliation: Hinduism
- District: Bundi
- Deity: Vishnu
- Festivals: Krishna Janmashtami, Holi
- Governing body: Devasthan Department - Govt of Rajasthan

Location
- State: Rajasthan
- Country: India
- Interactive map of Charbhuja Nath Temple
- Coordinates: 25.4459°N 75.6373°E

Architecture
- Type: Hindu architecture
- Founder: Rao Raja Surjan Singh

Charbhujanath Temple is an ancient Hindu temple located in the city of Bundi, located in Rajasthan, India. Dedicated to Charbhujanath, a four-armed form of Hindu major deity Vishnu, the temple is east facing and known for its historical significance and spiritual atmosphere. It is an important religious site for devotees in Bundi district. Thousands of Devotees visit here on Krishna Janmashtami and Phagotsav. 'Phagotsav' is a kind of celebration organized here at the time of festival of Holi from last 500 years.

== Location ==
The temple is situated at the Tilak Chowk place located in old city of Bundi. It is about 1.5 kilometers away from District H.Q.

== History ==
According to locals it is said that this temple was a Shiva temple, built before 1242 AD and known as Ksharaneshwar Mahadev temple. After this, in 1569 AD Hada Chauhan King Rao Raja Surjan Singh installed the idol of Charbhuja from Ranthambore Fort of Sawai Madhopur here in this temple and the old idol of Shiva was placed in the Mandap outside the temple. According to locals it is said that in a dream of King Rao Raja Surjan Singh, Charbhuja Nath himself ordered him to place the idol in this temple.

== Festivals and rituals ==
The temple is a hub of religious activities, with Janmashtami and Holi being major celebrations. Devotees also visit on Ekadashi and other auspicious occasions dedicated to Vishnu. Daily Arti and Bhajan are performed here. According to the Priest of the temple, 10-day long Phagotsav, a kind of celebration at the time of festival of Holi is celebrated with flower petals and Gulal and thousand of devotees visits here during this celebration.

== Maintenance issues ==
According to the locals the temple building has not repaired for a long time. The walls inside the temple have turned black due to rain water dripping. The officials have been informed about the possibility of the roof collapsing, but no one has taken any action so far. However, in 2024 the Government of Rajasthan announced to develop the Charbhuja Nath temple as a pilgrimage site and development work will be started.

== See also ==
- Malan Masi Balaji Temple
- Charbhuja
- Mandhata Balaji Temple
