= Jait Sagar Lake =

Fresh water reservoir in Bundi, Rajasthan

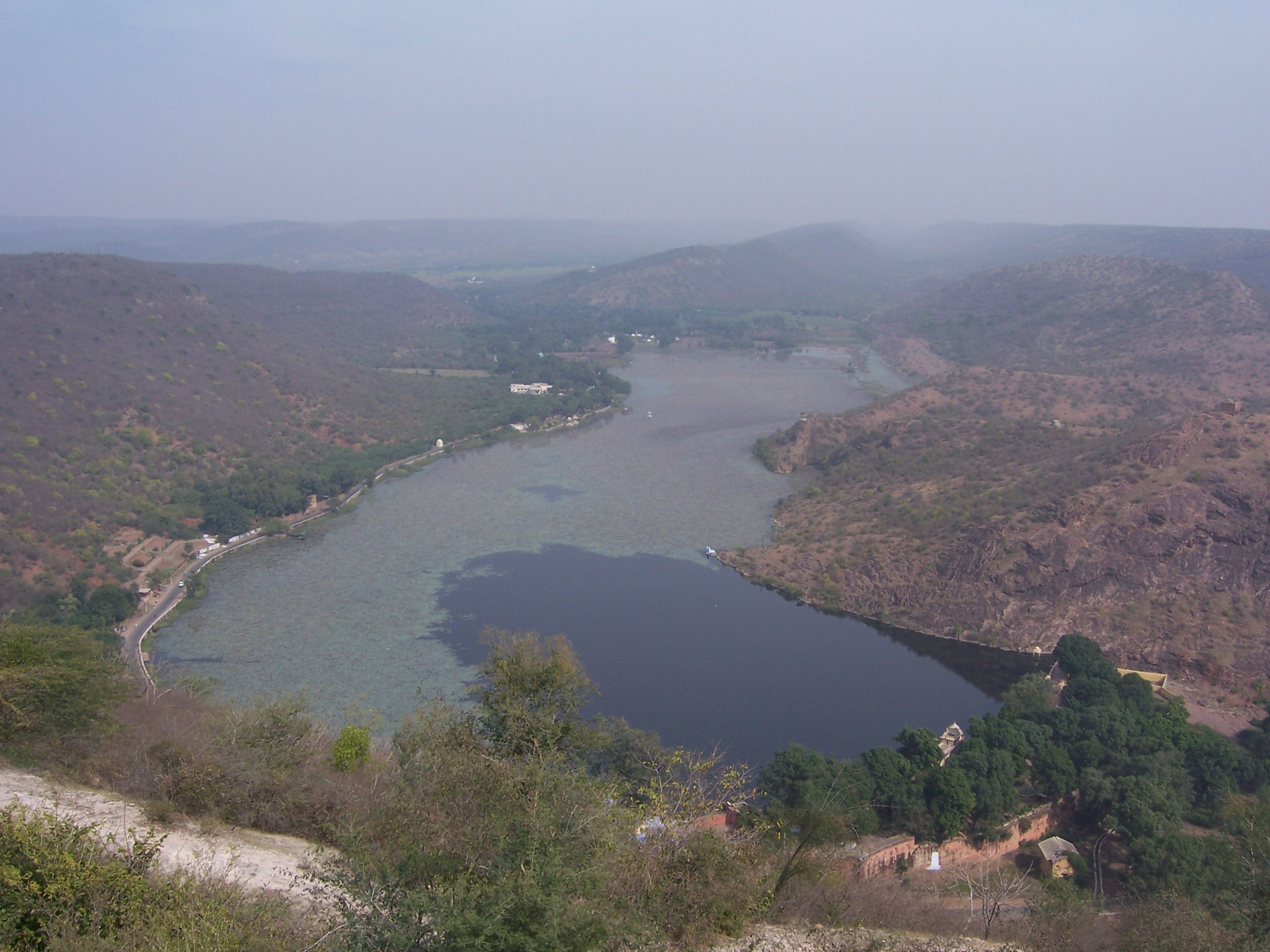

- Location within Rajasthan
- Location: Bundi, Rajasthan
- Coordinates: 25°27′26.49″N 75°38′55.32″E
- Type: reservoir, fresh water
- Basin countries: India
- Settlements: Bundi

Jait Sagar Lake is an natural lake or reservoir situated in Bundi city in the state of Rajasthan in India. It is surrounded by the hills of the Aravalli mountain range. This lake, near Taragarh Fort, is filled with lotus flowers during winter and monsoon seasons. Jait Sagar is surrounded by towering walls and has four gateways that serve as entry points to the lake. It is located at a distance of less than 3 km from Bundi city.

It is one of the four lakes of Bundi city, the other three being Nawal Sagar Lake, Phool Sagar Lake and Kanak Sagar Lake.

== History ==
The lake was built in the early 14th century A.D. by Mahraja Jaita Meena (last Meena ruler of Bundi), . Later on, it was repaired by Gehlotni Jayvanti, the mother of Rao Raja Surjan Singh (the ruler of Bundi between 1544 and 1585 A.D.) and the masonry work was done.

== Architecture and attractions of the lake ==
The lake is 4 km in length. It is flanked by the Aravalli range of mountains and the lotus flowers when in full bloom enhance its beauty during the monsoon (July–September) and winter (October–March) months. It is surrounded by huge walls having four ornamented gateways. Various competitions are held here from time to time. It is home to a wide variety of birds both resident and migratory.

There is a castle-like structure nearby known as Sukh Mahal, built during the reign of Umed Singh. It was host to Rudyard Kipling who wrote “Kim” during his stay here in the 19th century. It is one of the most visited summer palaces situated in Bundi. With the hills in the background and being surrounded by luxuriant and thriving gardens, Sukh Mahal is a significant tourist attraction. Some influence of Mughal art is to be seen in the paintings that adorn the walls of the palace.

== Lake restoration works ==
In 2015, the administration proposed to initiate boating in Jait Sagar Lake to promote tourism. Heavy machinery was brought in from Udaipur to free the lake from lotuses. For months, the lotuses were dug out. It is commonly held however that once the lotus takes hold in a conducive environment, it is simply impossible to eradicate it totally, and that is exactly what happened here: even in the depths of summer, the lotuses never lost ground.

The proposal for boating came around with the sanction of Rs 98 crore for Jait Sagar under the XI Five-Year Plan of GOI. Under the National Lake Conservation Project (NLCP), the state had prioritized lakes for inclusion in the plan. Detailed project reports were framed by the consultants. While 70% funds were to come from the union government, the state government committed to bear 30% of the project cost. Though it is not known exactly how much was spent on the project, sources say it was substantial.

== Cleanliness issues ==
In 2020, to save Jait Sagar Lake, aware and concerned city residents started the Save Jait Sagar Lake campaign. Citizens told the district collector that the filth in the lake should be cleaned, and that it should be beautified and conserved by removing lotus roots. Garbage is being dumped everywhere in the lake.

== Events ==
Jait Sagar is a popular destination for organizing events. Every year, Bundi Utsav, a cultural programme held by the tourism department of Rajasthan is organised at the lake shore. Many cultural activities take place under this programme.

== See also ==
- Sukh Mahal
- Taragarh Fort, Bundi
