= Nawal Sagar Lake =

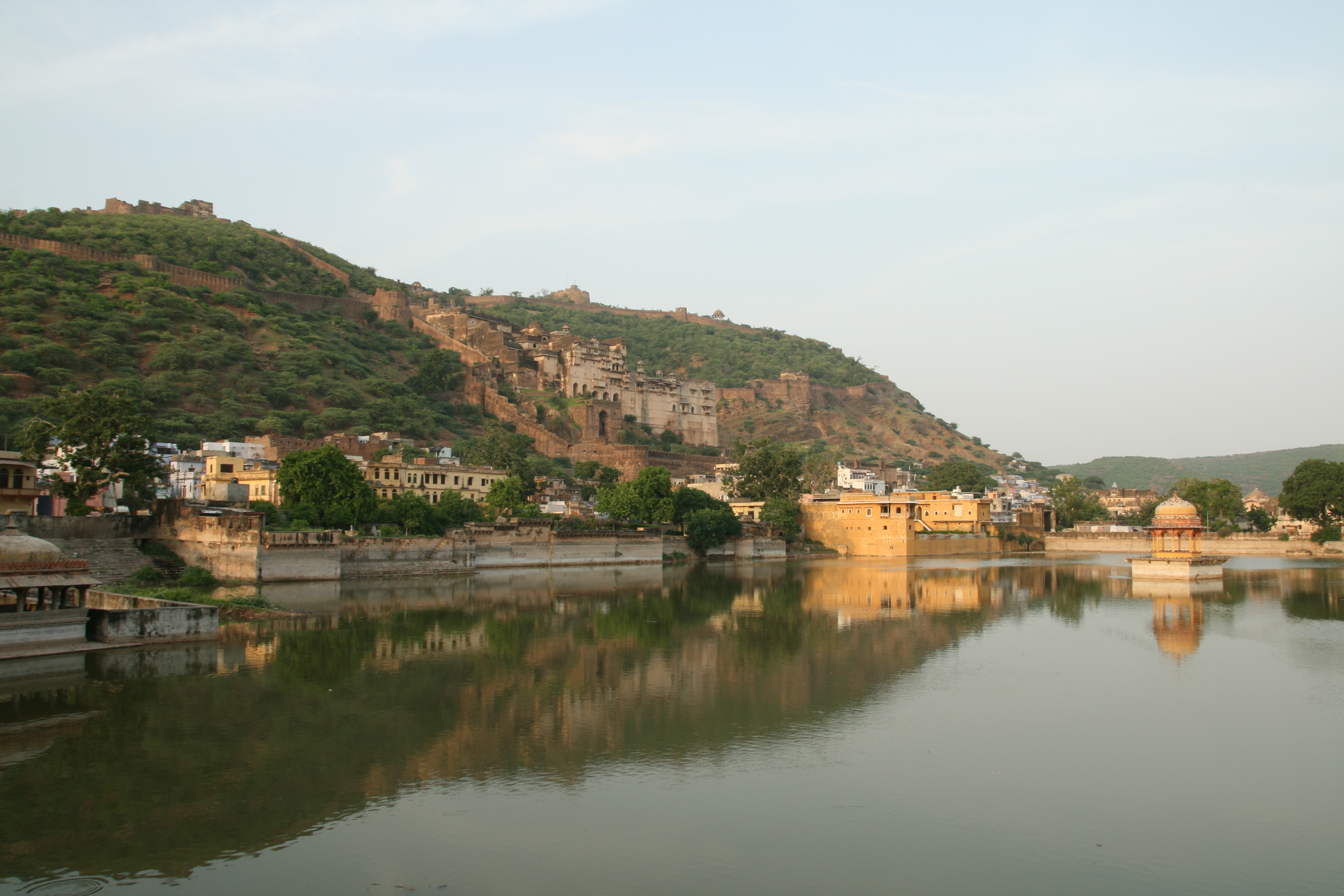

- Location within Rajasthan
- Location: Bundi, Rajasthan
- Coordinates: 25°26′46.91″N 75°37′59.88″E
- Type: reservoir, fresh water
- Basin countries: India
- Settlements: Bundi

Nawal Sagar Lake is an artificial lake or reservoir situated in Bundi city in the state of Rajasthan in India. It is surrounded by the hills of the Aravalli mountain range. It is a square shaped artificial lake, and a temple dedicated to Varuna, the God of ocean, is partially submerged in the middle of the lake. Nawal Sagar is surrounded by towering walls and has two gateways that serve as entry points to the lake. It is located in the centre of the Bundi city.

It is one of the four lakes of Bundi city, the other three being: Jait Sagar Lake, Phool Sagar Lake and Kanak Sagar Lake.

== History ==
It is an ancient Lake. The Hada Chauhan rulers of princely Bundi State Rao Raja Bhoj (1585–1608) had it deepened and the walls strengthened. He also built a palace named Moti Mahal (Rawala) on it. Later Rao Raja Chhatrasal (1631–58), Rao Raja Umed Singh (1741–69) built palaces and walls huge. Maha Rao Raja Ajit Singh (1770–73) built 'Ram Bagh' on its shore and a huge Shiva temple and a Chhatri inside the lake.

== Architecture and attractions of the lake ==
In this lake, the architecture, sculpture, and structure of its walls and Shiva temple are visible. The best aspect of the lake that primarily attracts the tourist is that it reflects a mirror image of the Taragarh fort in its water. The chhatri built in the centre of this lake is also a beautiful example of craftsmanship.

== Events ==
Nawal Sagar is a popular destination for organizing events. Every year, Bundi Utsav, a cultural program held by the tourism department of Rajasthan is organised at the lake shore. Many cultural activities take place under this program including Deep Dan ceremony in which clay lamps are floated in lake by local residents.

== See also ==
- List of lakes in India
- Jait sagar Lake
