= Chaurasi Khambon ki Chhatri, Bundi =

Chaurasi Khambon ki Chhatri
- ચોર્યાસીસ્તંભ છત્રી (Gujarati)
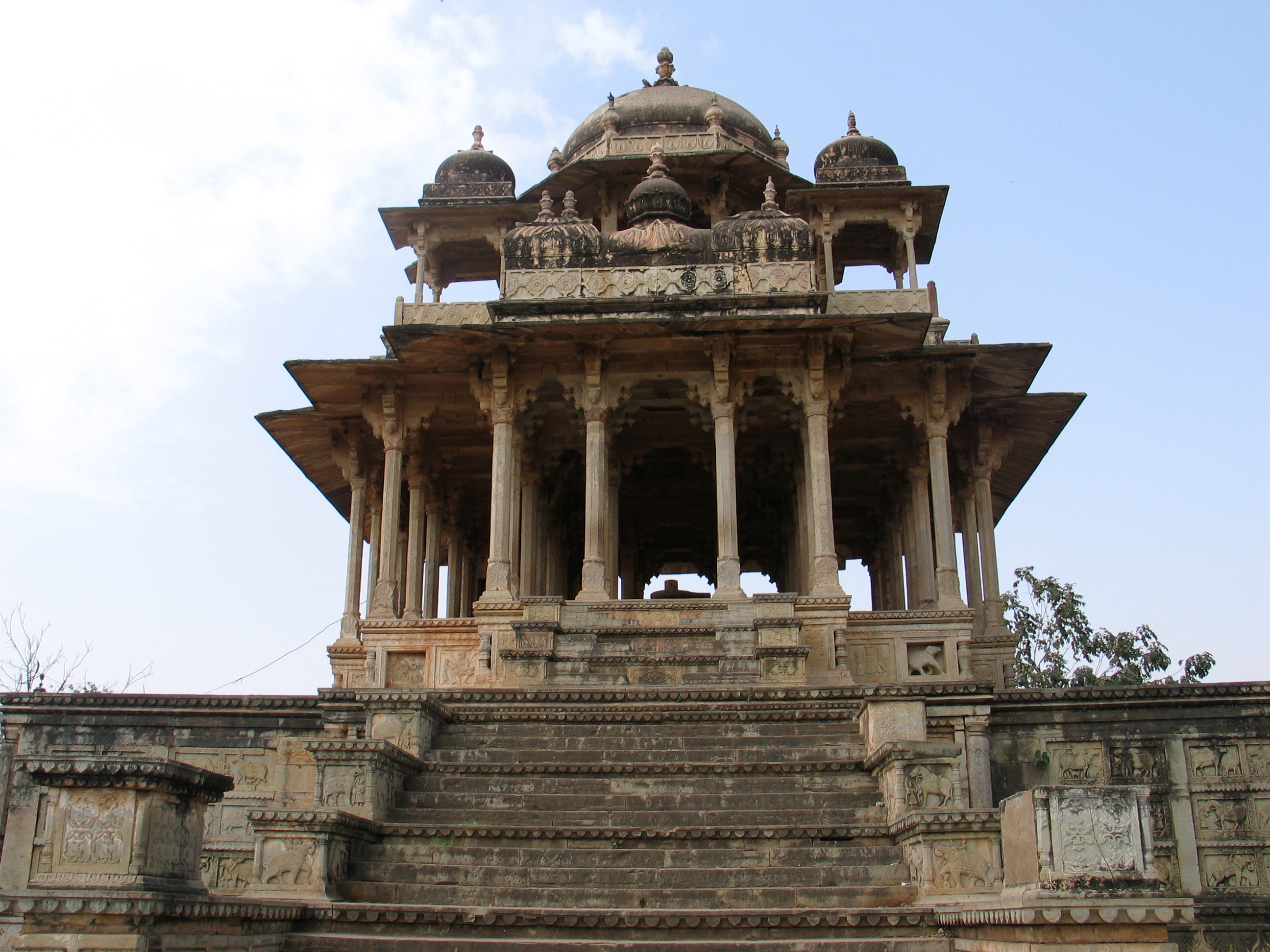
- Chaurasi Khambon ki Chhatri
- Interactive map of Chaurasi Khambon ki Chhatri
- Location: Bundi, Rajasthan, India
- Coordinates: 25.429807°N 75.647195°E
- Builder: Maharaja Rao Raja Anirudh
- Type: Chhatri
- Dedicated to: Deva (Foster brother of Maharaja Rao Raja Anirudh)

Chaurasi Khambon ki Chhatri or "84-Pillared Cenotaph" is a chhatri located in Bundi town, Rajasthan, India. It was built in the 17th century by Rao Raja Anirudh, the ruler from Hada Chauhan dynasty, as a memorial to his foster brother, Deva (who ruled over Bundi State). the structure is notable for its elaborate canopy supported by eighty-four intricately carved pillars. The structure has a large shivling covered under the canopy. It stands as an important example of Rajput funerary architecture, combining religious symbolism with structural elegance.

== History ==
The Chaurasi Khambon ki Chhatri was commissioned in 1683 by Maharaja Rao Raja Anirudh Singh of Bundi state, a prominent ruler of the Hada Chauhan Rajput dynasty. It was built in honor of Deva, son of a faithful wet nurse to the royal family. Unlike other cenotaphs dedicated to warriors or kings, this one commemorates a foster brother, son of wet nurse of humble origins, signifying her unique status and the respect she commanded within the palace. The site has not only retained its architectural integrity over the centuries but also its ceremonial relevance. Oral traditions in Bundi recount that members of the royal household would occasionally visit the site during special occasions or rituals to pay homage to Deva's memory.

== Architecture and Design ==
The cenotaph is built on a raised platform and comprises a square canopy supported by eighty-four intricately carved sandstone pillars. The number 84 holds religious significance in Hinduism, representing the 84 lakh yonis (life forms) a soul must traverse before attaining human birth, which suggests deeper symbolic intentions behind the monument. Each pillar is adorned with floral and geometric patterns, and some feature depictions of dancers, musicians, deer and elephants. The canopy is crowned with a central dome and four smaller chhatris on each corner, reflecting a blend of Mughal and Rajput architectures. The spatial rhythm created by the large number of pillars is said to create a hypnotic experience when viewed from within. The use of locally sourced Bundi sandstone and lime mortar speaks to the sustainable construction practices of the time. The monument follows the traditional "panchayatana" layout, where the central sanctum is surrounded by subsidiary elements, a common trait in Rajput memorial architecture.

== Cultural and Religious Significance ==
The cenotaph is primarily a secular monument, but its design borrows heavily from religious architecture. It has occasionally been mistaken for a temple due to its sanctified atmosphere and iconographic details. Local residents sometimes treat the structure with devotional reverence, offering flowers or lighting lamps, especially on full moon nights. The unusual dedication to a woman of non-royal background sets Chaurasi Khambon ki Chhatri apart. It reflects Bundi's nuanced socio-political ethos in the 17th century, where loyalty and service could sometimes transcend caste and class in royal recognition.

== Current Status and Preservation ==
Chaurasi Khambon ki Chhatri is under the protection of the Rajasthan State Department of Archaeology and Museums. Though not yet designated as a centrally protected monument by the Archaeological Survey of India (ASI), the site is recognized at the state level for its cultural value.
