= Raniji ki Baori =

Stepwell in Rajasthan

Coordinates: 25.4402°N 75.6394°E

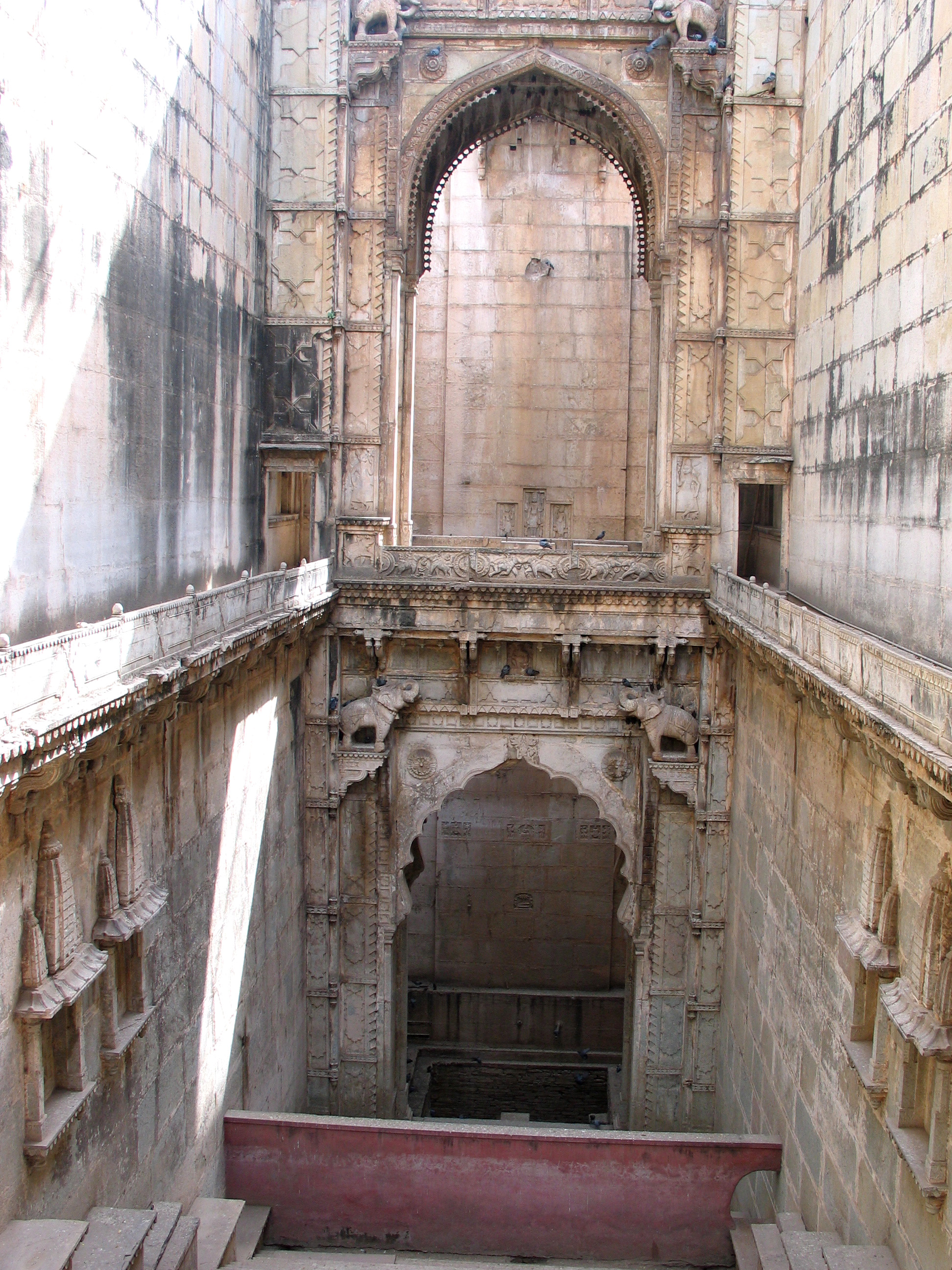
- Interactive map of Raniji ki Baori
- Type: Stepwell
- Location: Bundi, Rajasthan, India
- Height: 46 meters
- Built: 1699
- Built by: Rani Nathavati Ji Solanki
- Architectural style: Multistorey stepwell

Raniji ki Baori (or Queen's stepwell) is a noted stepwell situated in Bundi town in Rajasthan state in India. It was built in 1699 by Rani Nathavati Solanki who was the queen of Raja Anirudh Singh of Bundi. It is a 46 meter deep stepped well with carvings on its pillars and a high arched gate. It is a multistorey structure with places of worship on each floor. The step well has a narrow entrance marked by four pillars. Stone elephant statues that face each other stand in the corners. Ogee brackets decorate all the archways of 46 m deep Raniji ki Baori, which is reputedly the largest Baori of Bundi. Baoris were significant social constructions in the medieval Bundi since they acted as assembly areas for the townsfolk.

It was constructed during the reign of her son Maharao Raja Budh Singh who ruled Bundi from 1695 AD to 1729 AD.
