= Bundi =

- City
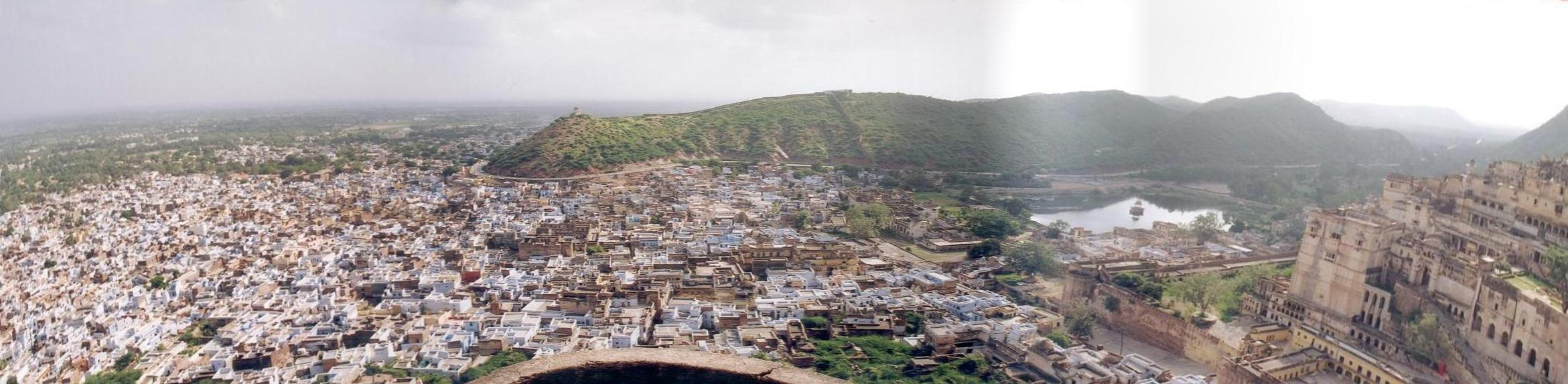
- Panoramic view of the old town and palace of Bundi.

- Location in Rajasthan, India Bundi (India)
- Coordinates: 25.44°N 75.64°E
- Country: India
- State: Rajasthan
- District: Bundi
- Named for: Bunda Meena

Government
  - Type: Municipal Council
  - Body: Bundi Municipal Council
- Elevation: 268 m (879 ft)

Languages
  - Official: Hindi
- Time zone: UTC+5:30 (IST)
- PIN: 323001
- ISO 3166 code: RJ-IN
- Vehicle registration: RJ-08
- Sex ratio: 922 ♂/♀
- Website: Bundi Municipal Council; Bundi District

Bundi is a city in the Hadoti region of Rajasthan state in northwest India.

== Etymology ==
The name Bundi is believed to derive from the name of a 13th century chieftain, Bunda Meena.

== History ==
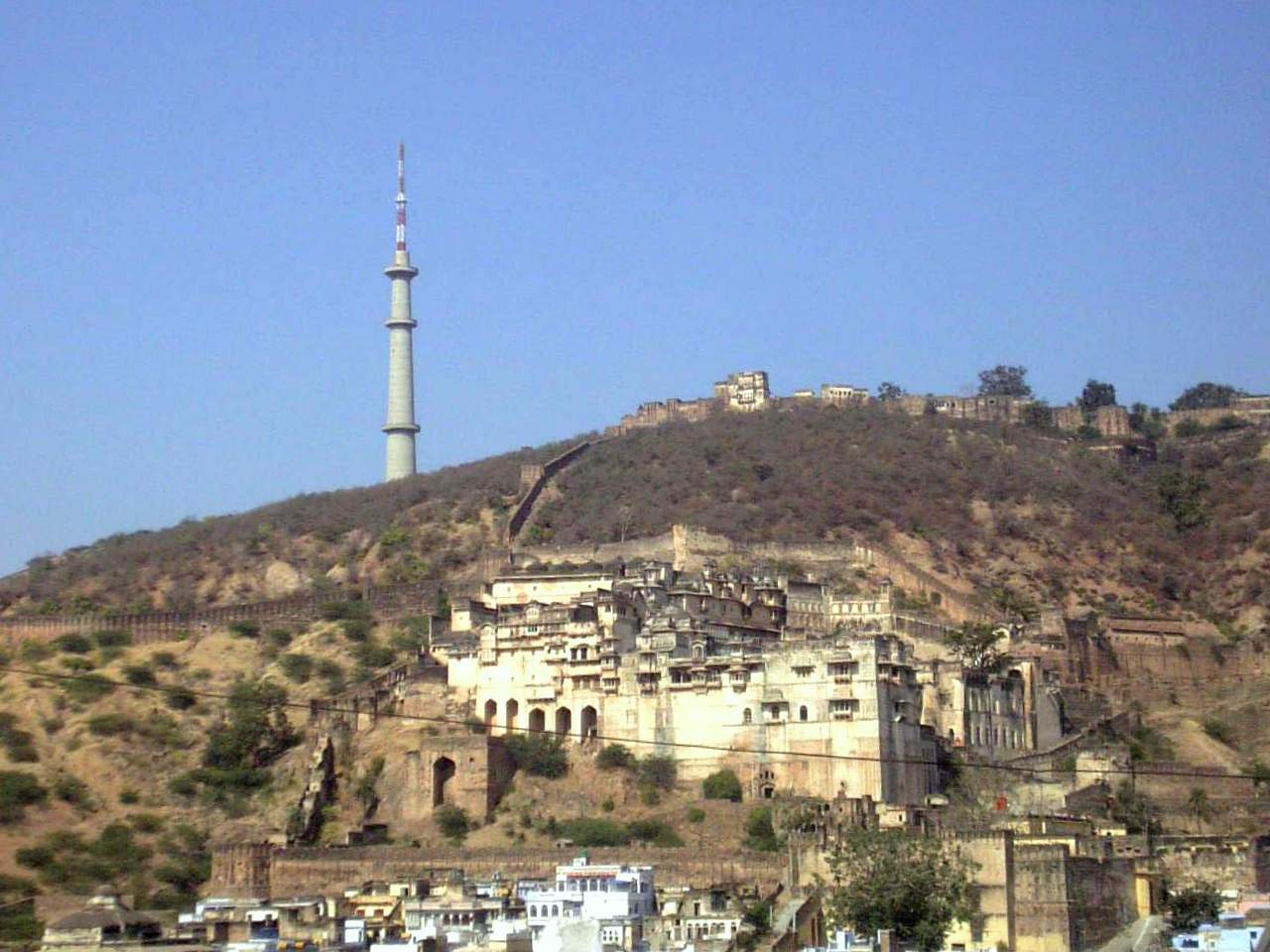
View of Bundi Fort and Palace from the Highway.

Artifacts from the Stone Age (dating from 5,000 to 200,000 years ago) have been discovered near Bundi.

In 1241, Bundi was established by a group of Chauhan nobles, who, having been defeated by Mohammed of Ghori, seized the territory from the Meena and Bhil tribes. Bundi was made the capital of their kingdom, Hadoti.

After the siege of Ranthambore in 1568, the ruler of the Kingdom of Bundi, Rao Surjan Singh, signed a treaty with the Mughal Empire, retaining a significant degree of autonomy.

In 1818, Rao Raja Bishan Singh formed an alliance with the British East India Company, wishing to counter the influence of the Maratha Empire in the region. During the Raj, Bundi retained regional independence as a princely state. Bundi's last ruler signed the Instrument of Accession in 1949, joining the new Dominion of India.

=== Satur national geological monument ===
The Great Boundary Fault at nearby Satur has been declared a National Geological Monument of India by the Geological Survey of India (GSI), for its protection, maintenance, promotion and enhancement of geotourism.

== Climate ==
The climate is hot semi arid (BSh), not having enough rainfall to qualify as a tropical savanna climate (Aw). The climate is quite warm, and most of the rainfall is concentrated during the summer monsoon season (June-September). It gets humid during the summer.

Climate data for Bundi (1991–2020)
Month	Jan	Feb	Mar	Apr	May	Jun	Jul	Aug	Sep	Oct	Nov	Dec	Year
Record high °C (°F)	29.8 (85.6)	36.4 (97.5)	42.0 (107.6)	46.0 (114.8)	47.0 (116.6)	48.0 (118.4)	45.5 (113.9)	37.4 (99.3)	41.2 (106.2)	39.4 (102.9)	35.4 (95.7)	30.5 (86.9)	48.0 (118.4)
Mean daily maximum °C (°F)	22.5 (72.5)	26.6 (79.9)	34.0 (93.2)	39.9 (103.8)	43.7 (110.7)	40.5 (104.9)	33.9 (93.0)	32.1 (89.8)	35.1 (95.2)	34.4 (93.9)	30.0 (86.0)	25.2 (77.4)	33.1 (91.6)
Mean daily minimum °C (°F)	8.4 (47.1)	12.2 (54.0)	18.7 (65.7)	24.7 (76.5)	28.6 (83.5)	28.1 (82.6)	24.5 (76.1)	23.9 (75.0)	24.0 (75.2)	20.0 (68.0)	14.5 (58.1)	11.0 (51.8)	19.8 (67.6)
Record low °C (°F)	3.0 (37.4)	3.6 (38.5)	10.4 (50.7)	14.0 (57.2)	18.4 (65.1)	19.6 (67.3)	19.0 (66.2)	18.0 (64.4)	18.0 (64.4)	13.0 (55.4)	9.5 (49.1)	5.5 (41.9)	3.0 (37.4)
Average rainfall mm (inches)	6.3 (0.25)	5.6 (0.22)	2.6 (0.10)	3.3 (0.13)	5.1 (0.20)	93.5 (3.68)	231.0 (9.09)	279.0 (10.98)	98.8 (3.89)	6.4 (0.25)	4.6 (0.18)	0.6 (0.02)	736.8 (29.01)
Average rainy days	0.4	0.4	0.3	0.3	0.7	5.0	10.2	13.0	5.2	0.4	0.4	0.1	36.3
Source: India Meteorological Department

== Demographics ==
In the 2011 Indian census, Bundi had a population of 103,286. Bundi's literacy rate was recorded at 72%, slightly lower than the then national average of 74%.

== Notable Landmarks ==
=== Taragarh Fort and Palace ===
Located high in the Aravalli mountain range, Taragarh Fort, also known as the "Star Fort", was constructed in the 1400s by Rao Dev Hada. The Taragarh Palace, below the fort, was constructed around 200 years later, during the reign of Rao Raja Ratan Singh (1607-31). It served as the official residence of the Maharajas. Unlike many other palaces in Rajasthan, its architecture contains very little Mughal influence. Further, it is built out of green-tinged stone, rather than the sandstone usually associated with Rajput architecture.

=== Sukh Mahal ===
Sukh Mahal, translating to "Palace of Pleasure", was built on the bank of Jait Sagar Lake by Rao Raja Vishnu Singh in the early 18th century. It served as the summer residence of Bundi royals.

=== Stepwells ===
Known as the 'city of stepwells', Bundi contains over 50 stepwells. Historically, these were used to protect the city from water shortages, evolving into places of gathering and worship; although many fell into disrepair during the colonial period, in which they were neglected. One of the largest stepwells in the city is Raniji ki Baori, a popular tourist destination. It was built in 1699 by Rani Nathawati, the wife of Rao Raja Anirudh Singh and is decorated with intricate carvings including avatars of Vishnu.

=== Chaurasi Khambon ki Chhatri ===
Chaurasi Khambon ki Chhatri or "Cenotaph of 84 pillars" is a 17th century chhatri constructed by Rao Raja Anirudh as a memorial to his favourite wet nurse, Deva. The number 84 is of spiritual significance in Hinduism, representing the 84 lakh life forms that one must pass through before attaining salvation; and each pillar is adorned with carvings of flowers, mythical scenes and deities.

=== Temples ===
Bundi is home to several temples including a partially submerged Varuna temple located in the middle of the artificial Nawal Sagar Lake; and the Charbhuja Nath Temple, devoted to Charbhujanath, a four-armed form of Vishnu, and situated within the old city.

== Culture ==
=== Literature ===
During the Mughal period, traditional Rajput poetry was fused with Mughal influence, particularly in the Charita (idealised biography) genre.

Rudyard Kipling visited Bundi in the late 19th century, staying at the Sukh Mahal. The palace and its surroundings inspired parts of his novel "Kim", which he completed in the city.

=== Art ===
Bundi is known for its miniature paintings, showcasing a traditional Rajput style that flourished from the 17th-19th centuries. Influenced by Deccan art forms, these paintings feature on the walls of the Taragarh Palace, depicting scenes of court life, battle formations, beasts and heavenly creatures. These paintings have inspired an art event called "Chitrashaala", held annually by Bengaluru-based fashion designer Deepika Govind and her husband Ashish Vohra.

=== Festivals ===
The festival of Bundi Utsav occurs annually in the city, for three days in Kartik, the eighth month of the Hindu calendar. First held in 1996, it involves folk music, an arts and crafts fair and traditional Rajasthani sports.
