= Taragarh Fort, Bundi =

Fort and palace in Rajasthan, India

Taragarh Fort
- Part of Rajasthan
- Bundi, Rajasthan, India
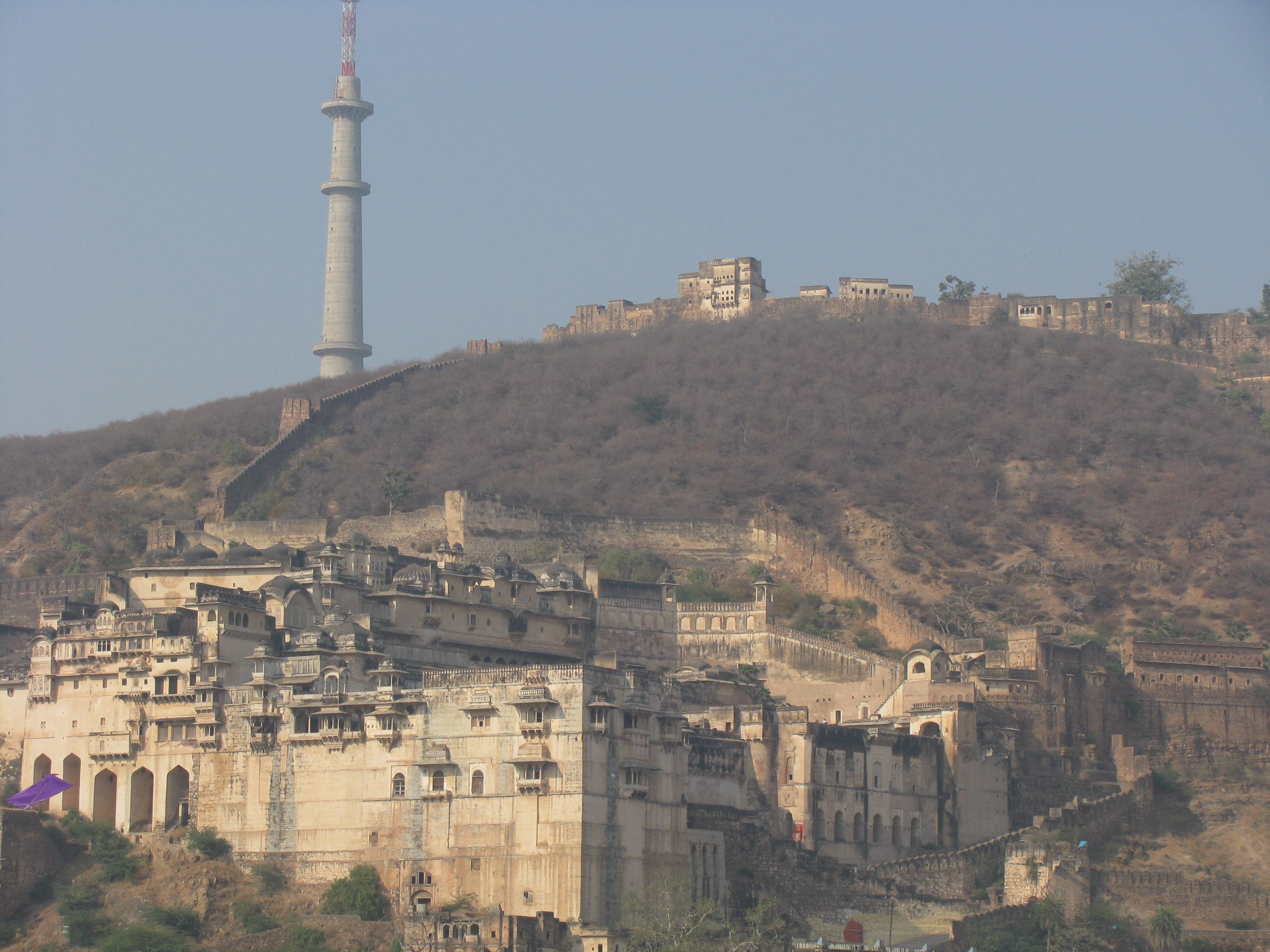

Site information
- Type: Fort and Palace
- Open to the public: Yes
- Condition: Good

Location
- India
- Coordinates: 25.452°N 75.637°E

Site history
- Built: 1354
- Built by: Rao Deva Hada

Taragarh Fort is a fort located in Bundi, Rajasthan, India. Located high on a hill of aravalli mountain range, it is the principal tourist attraction in Bundi. The fort was built here on a steep hill at a height of 1426 feet. Many tunnels were made in it to exit the fort during the battle. These tunnels are visible at many places in the mountains.

Taragarh Fort is a great example of Rajput architecture. Some of its buildings and work have influence of Mughal architecture. The palace was the residence of the Hada Chauhan Rajput Maharajas and their families.

== Geography ==
Taragarh Fort is situated on a forested hill of Aravalli mountain range in the city of Bundi, about 215 kilometres from Jaipur city, the capital of Rajasthan.

== History ==
Rao Deva Hada commissioned the fort in 1298 AD and Rao Raja Bar Singh Hada built it in 1354 AD. Successive rulers added their rooms to the palace, over the next 200 years, making it into one large palace with suites and rooms added at different levels on the hillside. What is interesting is that unlike other palaces in Rajasthan, there is very little Mughal influence in its architecture and the Fort represents a rare example of Rajput style - pavilions and kiosks with curved roofs, temple columns with carved brackets, covered with elephants and flowers.

Even more interesting is the fact that instead of the sandstone used in building most Rajput palaces, the palace at Taragarh was built with a special green-tinged stone, quarried locally in Bundi. Since this was a very hard type of stone, instead of resorting to fine carving the Bundi rulers decided to cover their walls and ceilings with splendid paintings.

== Architecture ==
The Palace is divided into five separate but main sections each with its own entry gate and courtyard. Which are as follows -

=== Hathia Pol ===
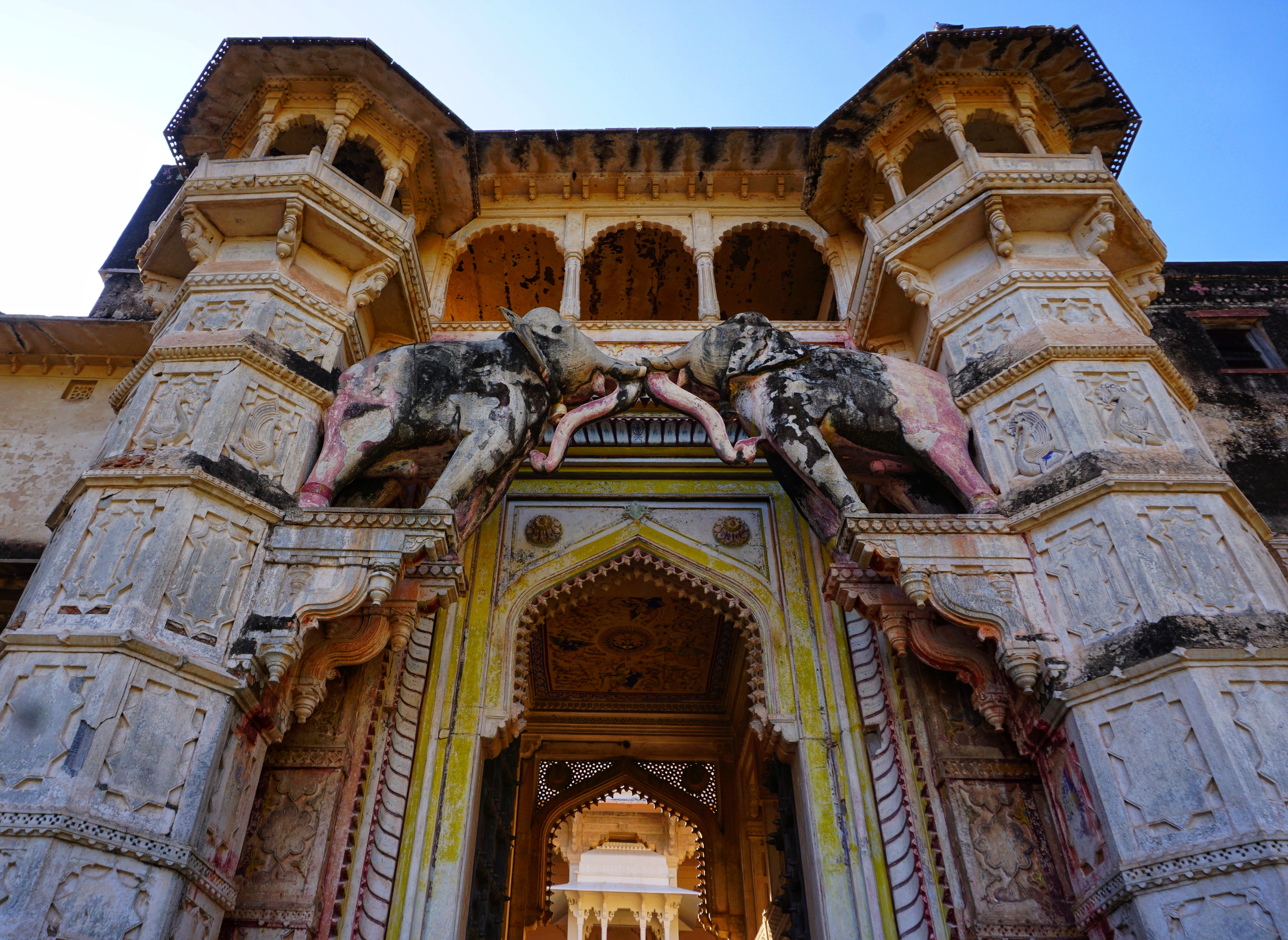
Hathi pol

The main entry is through the Hathia Pol or Hathi Pol (Elephant Gate) which leads to the first main courtyard.

=== Ratan Daulat ===
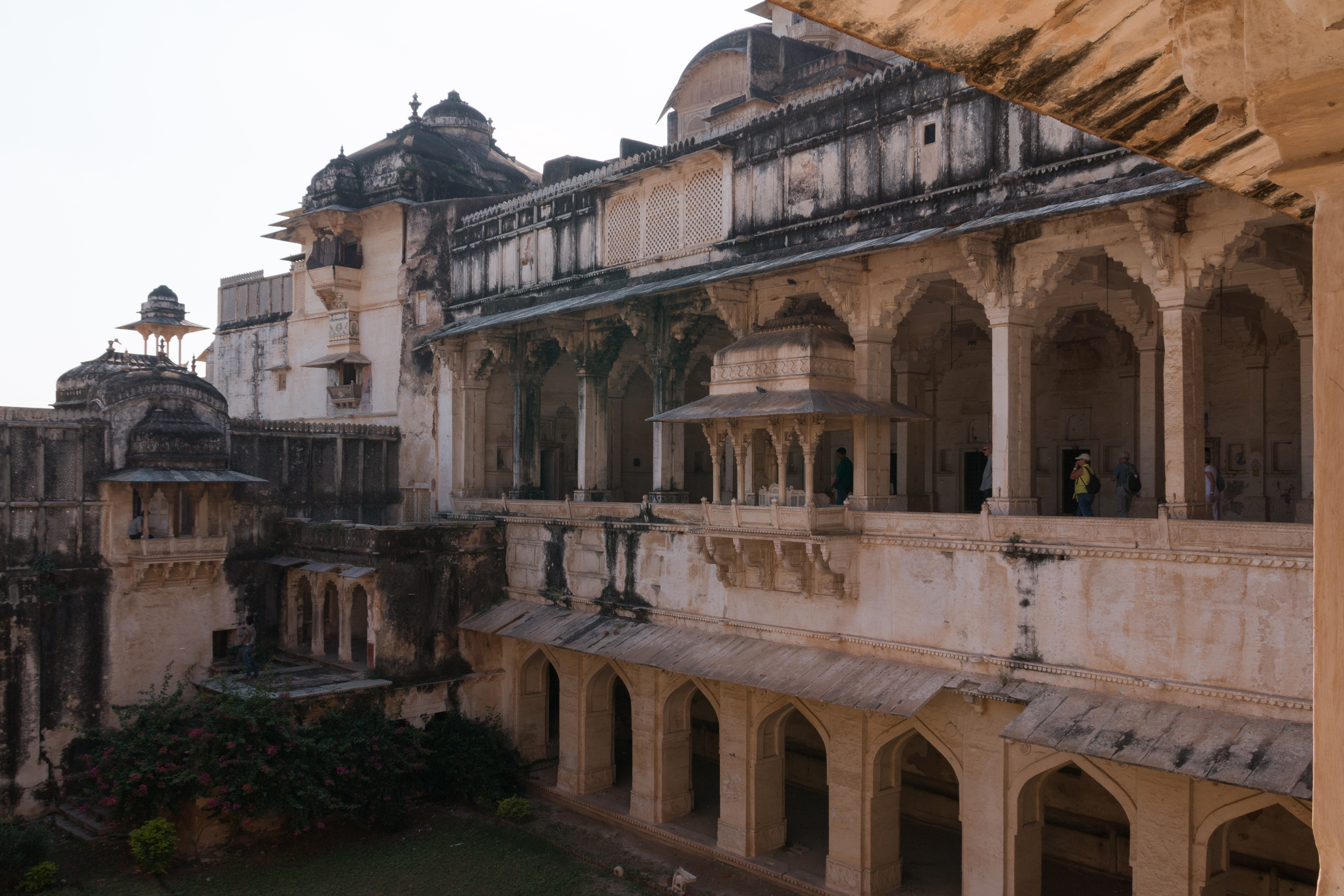
Ratan Daulat

This is the place Ratan Daulat or Diwan-e-Aam (hall of public audience). It consists of an impressive wide hall and has fine arrangements for keeping torches in its walls. There is also a marble throne of the Hada kings.

=== Chattar Mahal ===
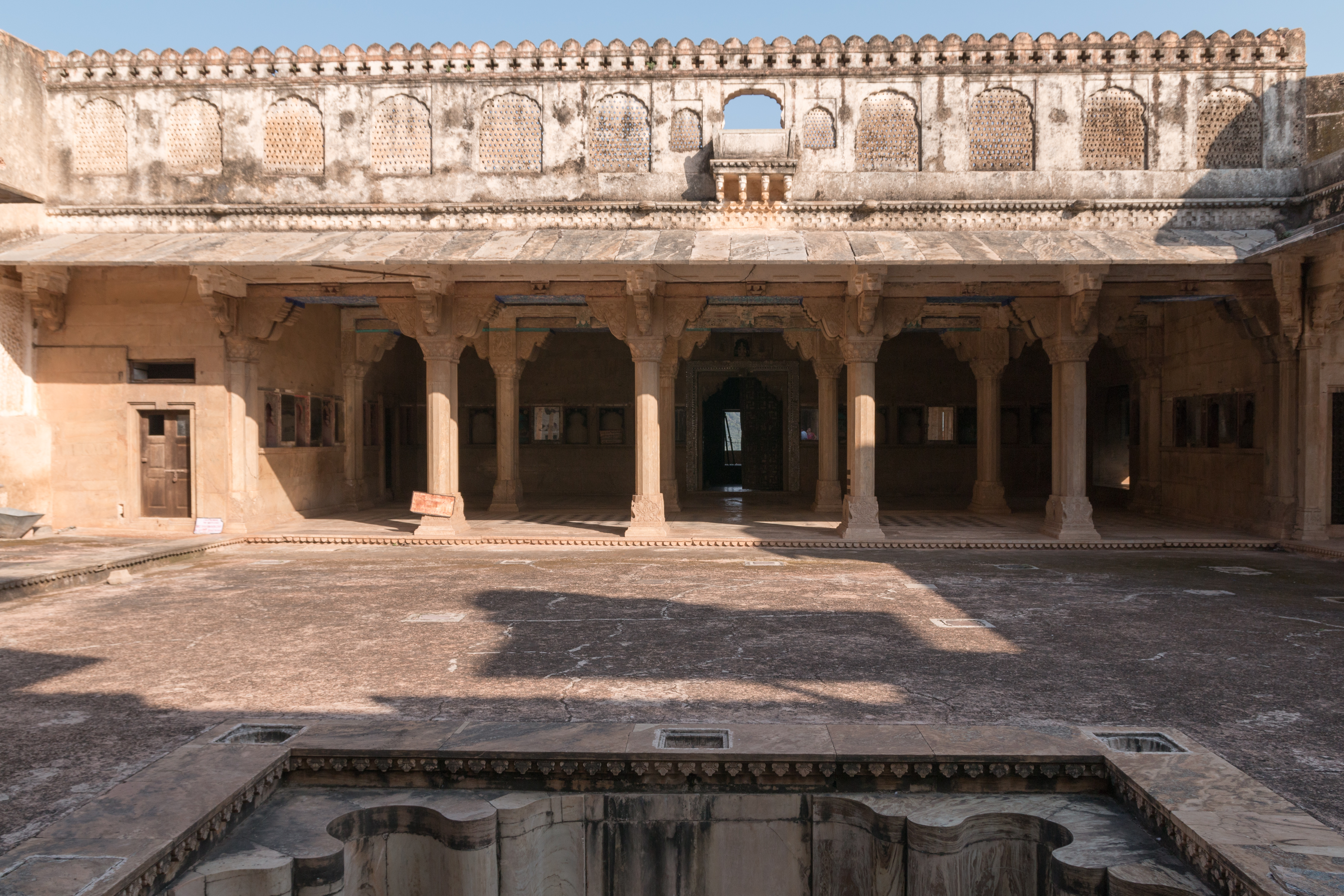
Chattar Mahal

A small door from Ratan Daulat admitted us into Chattar Mahal, built by Rao Chhatrasal Singh (1631–1658). Hathiya Sal Palace has elephant-capitalized columns and above it is Zenana Mahal (women's palace), decorated with paintings showing a variety of murals built by.

=== Badal Mahal ===
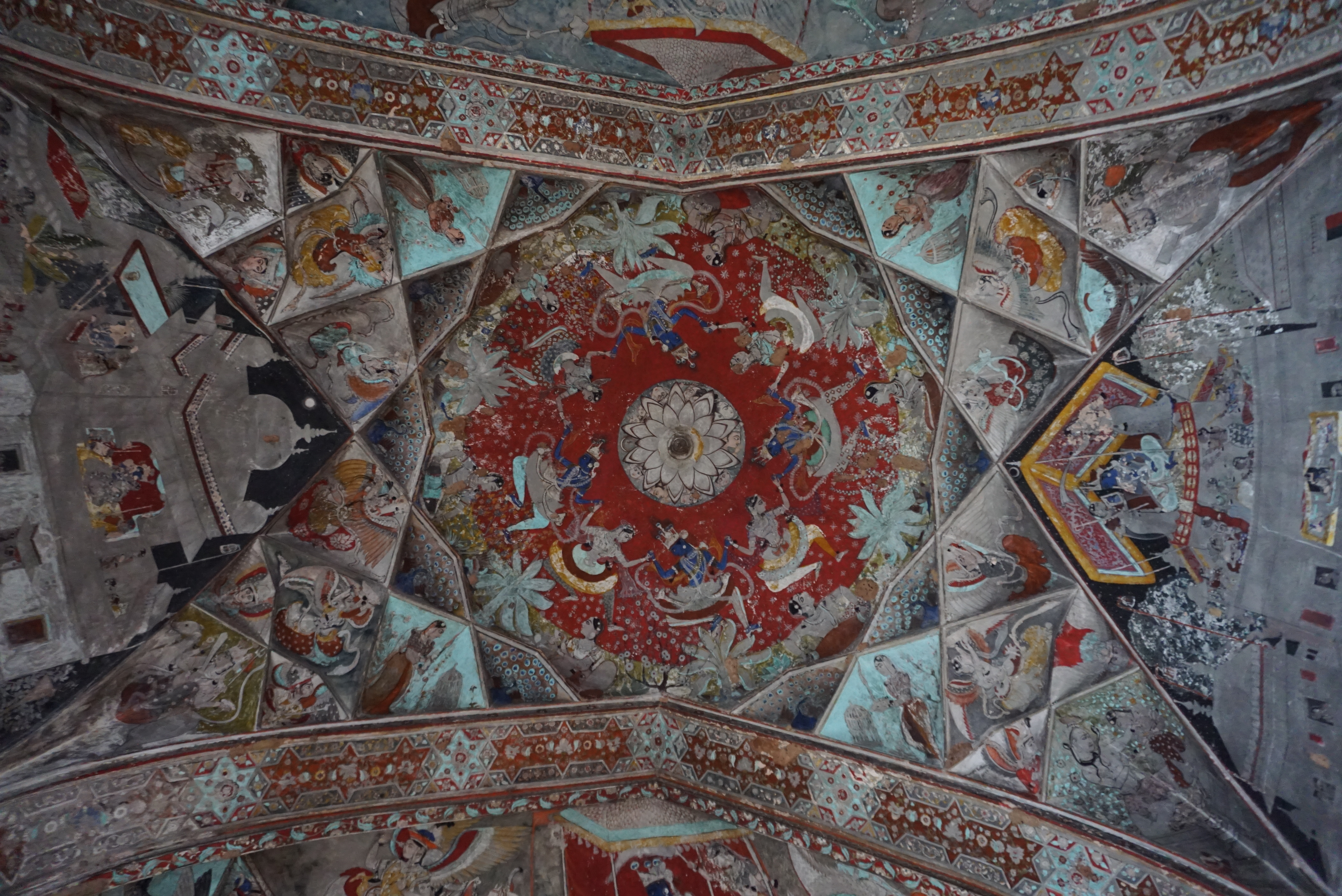
Badal Mahal

There is Badal Mahal (Palace of Clouds), right above Zenana Mahal. The Badal Mahal, built at the highest point in the fort, also has a fine collection of paintings on its walls. It is said that during the monsoons, the rain clouds were known to float through the courtyards of the palace. The palace is said to have been built by Rao Bhoj.

=== Chitrashala ===
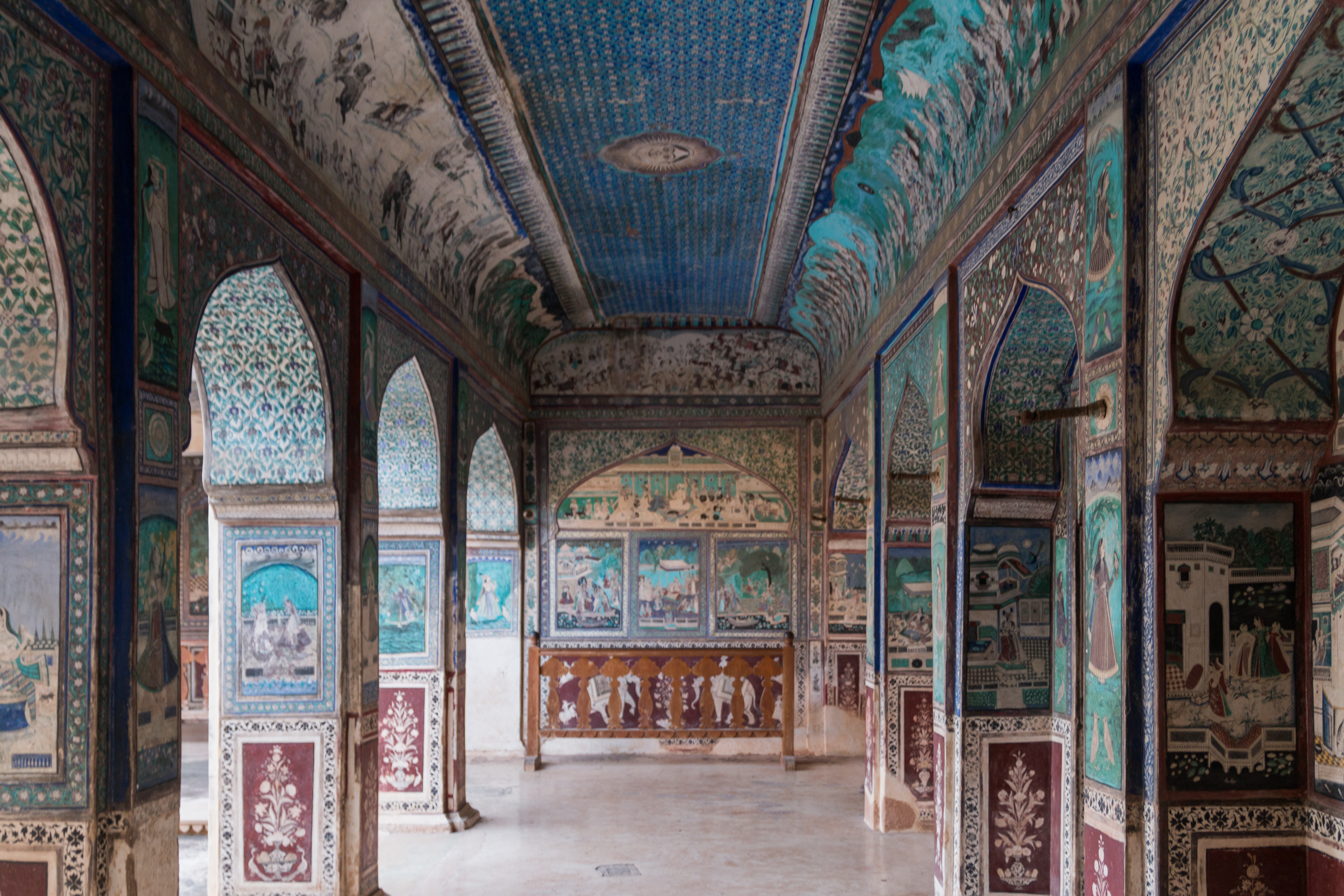
Chitrashala

The display of Bundi murals is in Chitrashala (in Ummed Mahal). The murals depict a variety of themes such as ragamala paintings, love stories and court processions; and they are influenced by Mughal and Mewar styles.

== Bhim Burj ==
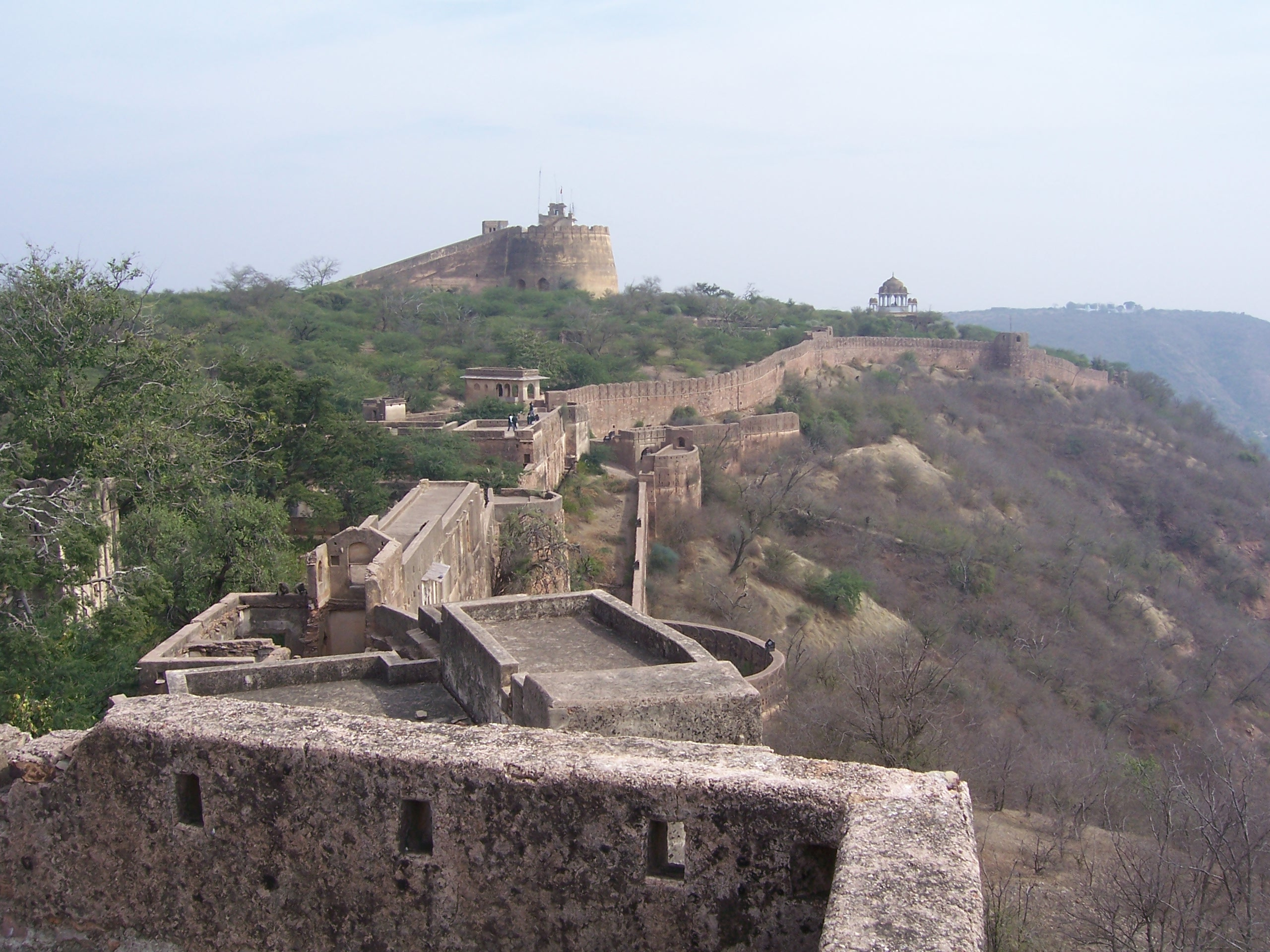
View of Bhim Burj

Going up the hill from this fort, there is a huge tower which is called Bhim Burj. Where weapons were kept. A cannon is also kept here whose name is Garbh Gunjan (Thunder from the Womb).It is said that when this cannon was fired, its terrible roar would create a stir in anyone's stomach.This cannon was used several times in the sixteenth century.

== Water reservoirs ==
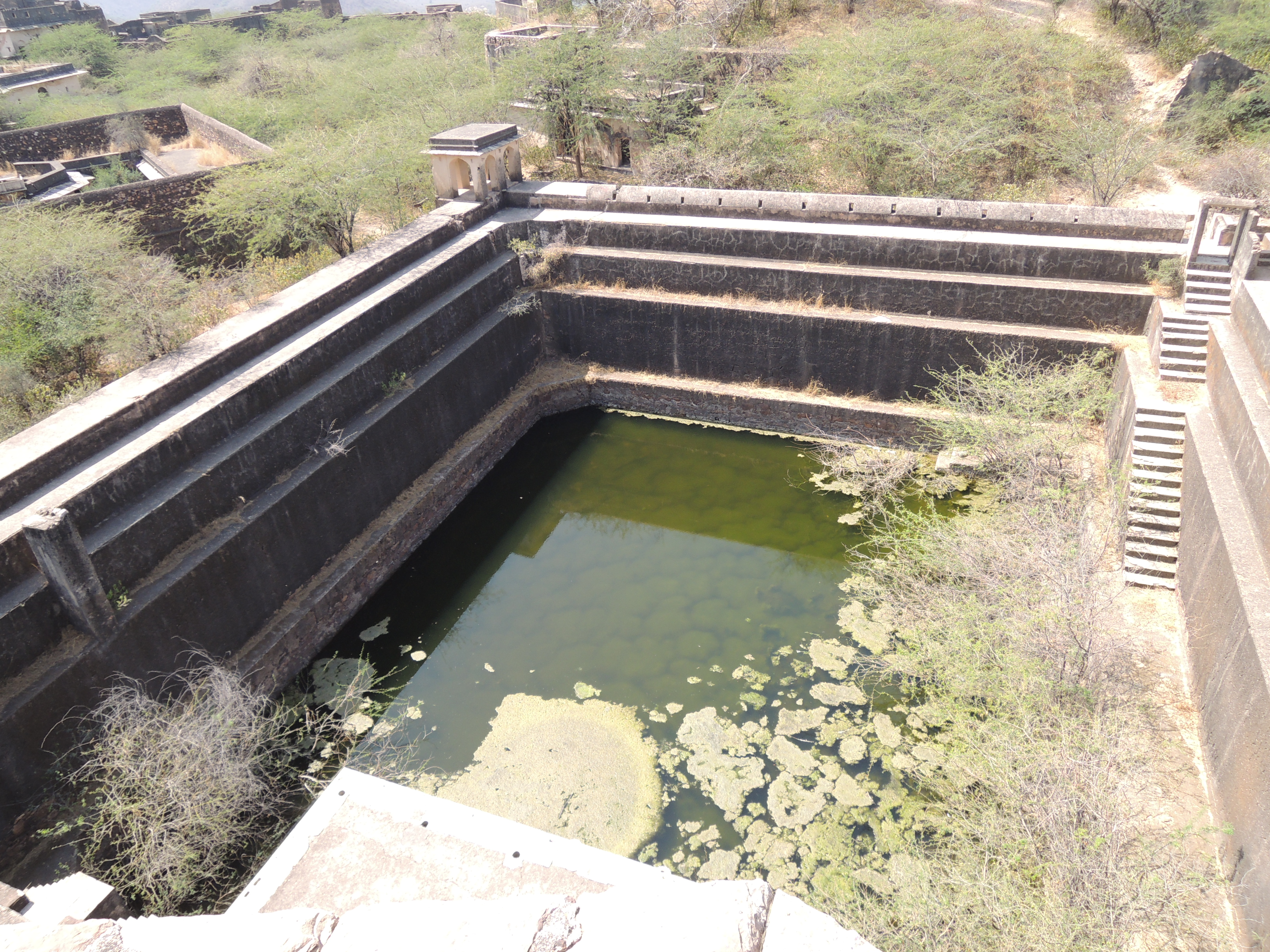
A water Reservoir

There are three ponds of drinking water in the fort. The construction of ponds is an example of excellent and sophisticated engineering. Rain water was stored in reservoirs and made available to people in times of need. Due to the presence of rocks at the base of the reservoirs, water remained accumulated here throughout the year.

== In popular culture ==
A popular TV serial named Ek Shringar - Swabhiman was shot in the Taragarh Fort.

== See also ==
- Jait Sagar Lake
- Nawal Sagar lake
- Dobra Mahadev Temple
