= Gajanan =

Gajanan is a given name. Notable people with the name include:

- Gajanan Maharaj, saint from Shegaon, Maharashtra, India
- Gajanan Jagirdar (1907–1988), veteran Indian film director, screenwriter and actor
- Gajanan Kirtikar, Leader of Shiv Sena Party in Mumbai, Maharashtra, India
- Gajanan Dharmshi Babar, member of the 15th Lok Sabha of India
- Gajanan Digambar Madgulkar (1919–1977), Marāthi poet, lyricist, writer and actor from India
- Gajanan Tryambak Madkholkar (1900–1976), Marathi novelist and a literary critic from Maharashtra, India
- Gajanan Madhav Muktibodh (1917–1964), Hindi poet, essayist, literary and political critic and fiction writer

== See also ==
- Gajanan Maharaj Temples
- Gajanan Maharaj Temple, Indore
- Gajanan Maharaj Temple, Kanhor
- Shri Sant Gajanan Maharaj College of Engineering, Shegaon, Maharashtra, India
- Shegavicha Rana Gajanan, Marathi film released in 2004
- Gajanan Vijay, a spiritual book written in Marathi language by Saint Shree Dasganu
- Gajan (disambiguation)
- Gajana
