= G. S. Khaparde =

Indian politician (1854–1938)

Ganesh Srikrishna Khaparde

Member of the Central Legislative Assembly
- In office 1920–1925

Personal details
- Born: 27 August 1854 Ingroli, Berar
- Died: 1 July 1938 (aged 83)
- Occupation: Lawyer; Scholar; Activist

Ganesh Srikrishna Khaparde (also known as Dadasaheb Khaparde) (27 August 1854 – 1 July 1938) was an Indian lawyer, scholar, political activist and a noted devotee of Shirdi Sai Baba and saint Gajanan Maharaj.

Born in a Deshastha Brahmin family at Ingroli in Berar, Khaparde studied Sanskrit and English Literature before beginning law. He graduated with an LLB in 1884, which led him to Government service. He served as a Munsiff and an assistant commissioner at Berar between 1885 and 1890. Closely associated with Bal Gangadhar Tilak, he took a keen interest in politics and in 1890 resigned from service to begin his own law practice at Amravati. Khaparde was the chairman of the reception committee at the Amravati Congress in 1897. He attended, along with Tilak, the Shivaji Festival of the Congress at Calcutta in 1906. He was at this time associated with the "Revolutionary" camp within the Congress, led by Lal Bal Pal trio of Lala Lajpat Rai, Bal Gangadhar Tilak and Bipin Chandra Pal. A close ally and one of the most trusted lieutenants of Tilak, Khaparde's strong and singular personal influence in the Central Provinces earned him the epitaph of "the Nawab of Berar". Between 1908 and 1910, Khaparde travelled to England to conduct Tilak's appeal to the Privy Council. Intelligence reports indicate that along with Bipin Chandra Pal, he was at this time associated with the India House.

Later, Khaparde was a founding member of Tilak's Indian Home Rule League in 1916, and was a member of the Congress's deputation to the Viceroy on constitutional reforms, with Vasukaka Joshi. Between May 1919 and January 1920, Khaparde was in England again as a delegate of the Home Rule League's deputation to the Joint Parliamentary committee. During his stay of seven months he made speeches in England. He became popular by way of his wit, humour and mannerism and hence some news-paper described him as Mark Twain.

Following the inauguration of Montagu–Chelmsford Reforms, he was selected a member of the Imperial Legislative Council. However, in 1920, Khaparde left the Congress anticipating Gandhi's Non-cooperation movement. Between 1920 and 1925, Khaparde was elected as a member of the Central Legislative Assembly.

As noted in Shree Gajanan Vijay, he was devotee of Gajanan Maharaj of Shegaon. Many reference texts of his are available in the epic.

G.S. Khaparde was also a noted devotee of Shirdi Sai Baba. His first interaction with Sri Sai Baba was in December 1910 when he sought refuge at Shirdi escaping the incarceration and purge of political dissidents in India at the time. Between 1910 and 1918, his Shirdi diary recording visits to Sai Baba shed much light on Baba's life, his routine, and his work.

G.S. Khaparde had a son, Balkrishna Ganesh Khaparde, also a lawyer and leader. He died on 1 July 1938.

== Sources ==
- Popplewell, Richard J. (1995), Intelligence and Imperial Defence: British Intelligence and the Defence of the Indian Empire 1904–1924, Routledge, ISBN 0-7146-4580-X, archived from the original on 26 March 2009
- Rigopoulos, Antonio (1993), The life and teachings of Sai Baba of Shirdi, SUNY Press, ISBN 0-7914-1267-9.
- Ruhela, S.P (1998), The Immortal Fakir of Shirdi, Diamond Pocket Books, ISBN 81-7182-091-3.
- Sinha, P.B (November 1971), "A New Source for the History of the Revolutionary Movement in India, 1907–1917", The Journal of Asian Studies, 31 (1): 151–156, doi:10.2307/2053060, JSTOR 2053060.
- Wolpert, Stanley (1989), Tilak and Gokhale:Revolution and Reform in the making of Modern India, Oxford University Press, ISBN 0-520-03339-6.
- Yadav, B.D (1992), M.P.T. Acharya, Reminiscences of an Indian Revolutionary, Anmol Publications, ISBN 81-7041-470-9.
- Ekkirala, Bharadwaja (1975), Saibaba The Master, Hyderabad: Sri Manga Bharadwaja Trust, archived from the original on 25 November 2015.
