= Gajanan Maharaj Temple, Indore =

Temple in Indore, Madhya Pradesh, India

Coordinates: 22.723°N 75.898°E

Gajanan Maharaj Temple
- Location within Tamil Nadu

Religion
- Affiliation: Hinduism
- District: Indore
- Deity: Saint Gajanan Maharaj

Location
- Location: Indore
- State: Madhya Pradesh
- Country: India
- Interactive map of Gajanan Maharaj Temple

Shri Sant Gajanan Maharaj Temple Indore is situated at Paliwal Nagar in Indore, Madhya Pradesh, India.

== About the Temple ==
"Sarv jan Hitaaye, sarv jan sukham" this sentence motivated the establishment Shri Sadguru Gajanan Maharaj Sevashram at Indore. In the year 1988 Mr. Paliwal donated the area of 13,000 square feet (1,200 m^{2}), on the auspicious day of Basant panchami ritual ceremony of "Bhumi pujan" was done under the guidance of Shri Guru baba and in the presence of the Gajanan family. After "Bhumi pujan" two rooms were constructed. In one of the two rooms big photo of Shri Gajanan Maharaj was being placed and worshiped by devotees. In the year 1992 the Thursday 'Maha Prasad' started, around 13 devotees took the 'Maha prasad' on the first day.

Today Thursday 'Satsangh' and 'Maha Prasad ' is celebrated in large numbers. Devotees from Indore and outside Indore come to celebrate it. In the year 1992 on the important day of ' Prakat Diwas' the statue of Shri Gajanan Maharaj was being placed. The temple's ritual place is of size 224 square feet (20.8 m^{2}) and possess the "Ashtkoti". The 'Ashtkoti' is one among the 'asht siddhis' of Guru maharaj. The importance of 'Ashtkoti' is explained in the 'Garud Sanhita'. The 'Ashtkoti' temple is spread in 2,200 square feet (200 m^{2}), and consist the pillars of marbles and granite.

It also possess the 21 ritual thought. In the year 1994 the establishment of this temple was finished. From the construction of temple till now the members of Gajanan family felt the presence and blessing of Shri Gajanan maharaj. Institution like this are being established till now which can not be abstracted in few words. May the blessing of Shri Gajanan Maharaj always be poured on all devotees.

== Religious Significance ==
Shegaon has gained popularity as Sant Gajanan Maharaj lived and died there. Gajanan Maharaj is considered to be a saint with miraculous powers. The origin of Gajanan Maharaj is unknown, this holy place of worship is built at his place of death. The great personality was laid to rest on 8 September 1910. Sant Gajanan Maharaj Sansthan is one of the largest temple trusts in Vidarbha region, it is often called by people the ‘Pandharpur of Vidarbha’. It draws pilgrims from all over the state of Maharashtra. The sacred Ashtkoti in the temple is considered as Asht Siddhis or psychic abilities or powers of Gajanan Maharaj and is very much explained in the sacred Garud Sanhita.

== Architecture ==
The temple structure is completely built of Dholipuri stones and marble which was completed in the year 1994. The temple has 3 floors which is named as Talghar (Basement), Shabhamandap (Main Hall) and First floor for reading Maharaj's pothi. These floors are designed to symbolizes Yogmarg, Bhaktimarg and Karmamarg respectively. The main Garbh-Griha or the place where Maharaj is placed is nearly 224 sq. ft. and is in octagonal shape. The Octagonal form is designed to depicts protection and presence of the Eight Sidhees of Shree Gajanan Maharaj. The Sabha Mandap of the temple is nearly 2,000 square feet in size and the main idol is 5 feet tall, which is made up of marble.

== See also ==
- Gajanan Maharaj
- Gajanan Maharaj Temples - Located all over Maharashtra
