= Tilori Kunbi =

Tilori Kunbi is an agricultural, landlord community in the Konkan division and Vidharba of the Indian state of Maharashtra.

They are found in Mumbai, Thane, Palghar, Raigad, Ratnagiri, Sindhudurg, Nagpur, Balaghat, Wardha and the Chandrapur districts. OBC status is accorded to the Kunbis.

== Culture ==
The Kuladevatas mainly worship shivling, Shiva or Shakti as Khandoba or Bhavani. Some of the members from Mumbai, Palghar, Thane and Raigad were converted to Christianity by the Portuguese and have been amalgamated into the East Indian Catholic community. The main festivals of this community are Shimagotsav, Chatrapati Shivaji Maharaj Jayanti, Ganesh Chaturthi and Gudi Padwa.
