= Gajanan Maharaj Temple, Kanhor =

Temple in Kanhor, Maharashtra

Shri Sant Gajanan Maharaj is known to most of the people in Maharashtra. He stayed most of his life at Shegaon in Buldhana district in Maharashtra and has taken "Samadhi" there. Therefore, Shegaon has got a special significance for Maharaj and his devotees. Shegaon hosts a magnificent temple. His devotees have constructed many Gajanan Maharaj Temples in different parts of Maharashtra, India. A small temple has also been constructed at Kanhor, Kulgaon, Badlapur, Dist. Thane.

The temple is situated just outside Badlapur village on a small hillock surrounded by fields and greenery all around. The natural environment around the temple is another attraction for the devotees who visit the temple.

== About the Temple ==
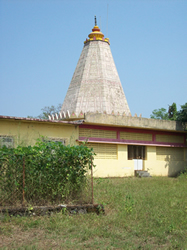
Scenic View of the Gajanan Maharaj Temple at Kanhor.

Shri Sant Gajanan Maharaj Seva Samiti was established in 1981. Shri Vitthalrao Raut gave his land for the construction of the temple. Here is how it happened.

Shri Shripadrao Kulkarni was a committed devotee of Shri Gajanan Maharaj. Once in his dream he was told by Maharaj to construct a temple. Shri Kulkarni, could not think of anything else since that day. He was restless. He told this to his friend Shri Bapat. Both of them started searching for the place to construct a temple. They were told that Badlapur has some land up for sale. The land was under "ceiling" and hence could not be bought for this purpose. When Shri Vitthal Raut, Badlapur came to know about this, he decide to offer his own land for the construction of the temple free of cost. The place is situated on a small hillock just outside the village. On a backdrop of the temple, on a hill, Shri Khandoba blesses all the devotees who visit Maharaj.

The place was transferred to Seva Samiti and then the construction of the temple started. The Bhumipujan was done by Shri Ganapatrao Raut (Father of Shri Vitthalrao Raut) and his wife. Whole of Kanhor participate in this ceremony with zest and enthusiasm. A small miracle happened during these times. An "Audumbar" tree grew up beside the planned location of the temple. Prakat Din utsav was regularly celebrated under this same tree since 1981. This temple was realized on Vijaya Dashami - Dasara in 1981.

== How to reach Kanhor (Badlapur) ==
Shri Sant Gajanan Maharaj Temple is reachable by Maharashtra State Transport Bus or Auto rickshaws in 15 minutes from Badlapur (Central) Railway Station. This distance to the temple from Badlapur Railway Station is about 7 km.

One can reach Badlapur by local railway from Thane, Kalyan or Chhatrapati Shivaji Terminus (Mumbai).

== Shree Gajanan Maharaj Prakat Din Utsav Pictures ==
Shree Gajanan Maharaj Prakat Din Utsav was held at Shree Gajanan Maharaj Kanhor Temple ( now in its 24th year ) from 14 February 2009 to 19 February 2009. Some of the pictures are shown below:

Devotees gather for the Palkhi Miravnuk.

School children performing Traditional Dance.

Palkhi Miravnuk (Palanquin Procession) Begins.

Close-up View of Gajanan Maharaj during the Palkhi Miravnuk.

Devotees chanting Shri Gajanan Maharaj's name to the tune of cymbals and dholki.
