= Gajanan Vijay =

Book written by Sri Dasganu Maharaj

Gajanan Vijay Granth, is a book written by Sri Dasganu Maharaj. It is a biography of the saint, Gajanan Maharaj of Shegaon, in Buldhana district of Maharashtra, in India. The poetic meter followed is the ovi, which is traditional for classical Marathi literature. The book consists of 21 chapters, with the total number of ovis being 3,668.

== Background ==
The Gajanan Vijay Granth was written by Sri Dasganu Maharaj, in March or April 1939 AD. He was insisted to write the biography of the saint by Ramchandra Patil, of Shegaon. The entire granth was written on the basis of papers and sources provided to Dasganu Maharaj by Ratansa in Shegaon.

== Summary ==
Chapter 1

The Author begins with greetings and oblations to God, to help complete this biography of the Saint of Shegaon. It introduces the saint, who is said to have no known caste, creed or source. He is seen in Shegaon by Bankatlal Agrawal and Damodarpant Kulkarni, at the rutushanti of the young boy of the Paturkars. He was sitting at the place where all the empty food platters(patryawalya) were thrown. He was eating from the remains of the food left in the plates. They notice his behavior and deduce something divine within him, who is described to have broad shoulders, a long and flexible neck, and eyes focused on the tip of his nose. Bankatlal tells the Paturkars to bring out a plate for the saint and the saint mixed everything and promptly ate everything. He also drank from the water provided for animals, and not from the water brought for him by Bankatlal, insisting the fact the Brahma exists everywhere, and there is no distinction. Baktalal and Damodarpant try to bow down to the saint, but he runs away.

Chapter 2

After seeing the saint run away, Bankatlal Agarwal felt morose, and kept thinking about Sri Gajanan Maharaj. His upset behavior was noticed by his father, although Bankatlal dismissed it, due to fear of rejection. Bankatlal began scouring Shegaon in search of the saint. Banktatlal told his concerns to his elderly neighbour, Ramajipant Deshmukh, who confirmed the saint's divine nature. Bankatlal finally found Maharaj at a Kirtan by Govindbua Taklikar in the Mahadev temple of Shegaon. He denied dakshina offered by Bankatlal, instead asking him for Betel leaves and Bhaakri from the house of a mali. He also demonstrated his divine abilities with the fact that the vessel the saint gave to Pitamber, when dipped in unclean stagnant water only gathered clear water. The saint was taken to the house of Bankatlal, on the permission of Bhavaniram, father of Bankatlal Agarwal. There the saint was offered food, clothes, and other offerings. the saint stayed the night. He was bathed by devotees the next morning. The saint stayed at Bankatlal's house and devotees chanted his mantra:"Gan Gan Ganat Bote". He also vomited 3 seers of food which was offered to him, just like Samarth Ramdas Swami did, previously. The author gives a brief summary of the saint's daily routine.

Chapter 3

This chapter begins with a Gosawi coming to the house of Bankatlal for offering Sri Gajanan a pipe(chileem) for smoking Marijuana. Janrao Deshmukh, who is mortally ill, is close to death. His situation is told to Bankatlal Agarwal, who on the permission of his Father, takes water from the feet of the saint(padtirtha) to give to Janrao Deshmukh as medicine. Janrao immediately recovers from his illness, and is kept on the padtirtha. The author makes a clarification about the types of deaths(natural, self-inflicted and unnatural) and states that saints can only prevent self-inflicted and unnatural causes of death, and natural ones cannot be stopped or averted. Maharaj demonstrated his desire for the good in society by dealing with a hypocrite, Vithoba Gathol who began to turn the saint's devotion into a business, and bragged about his intimacy to the saint.

Chapter 4

The chapter began on Akshaya Tritiya, whence Maharaj demonstrated his yogic powers by infecting the curry for the event of Akshaya Tritiya by Jankiram Sonar, with worms, after he dishonoured the saint, and refused to light the saint's pipe. Gajanan Maharaj later removed the worms from the curry after Jankiram Sonar apologized to the saint. The saint also insisted to eat Kanhole by Chandu Mukin made a month ago, and when Chandu found them in an earthen pot later, they were still fresh and did not feel stale. Sri Gajanan Maharaj also met a Brahmin called Madhao, who had lost his spouse and children. He lost interest in life and began starving himself to beg the pardon of god. Maharaj told him not to starve himself, then showed him Yama, the god of death. Madhao insisted Maharaj to send him to Vaikuntha. Maharaj did so. Sri Gajanan Maharaj desired to listen to the Vedic Scriptures, and soon after a team of learned Brahmins appeared in Shegaon.

Chapter 5

Sri Gajanan Maharaj left Shegaon to meditate in an age-old temple of Shiva in the forest near Pimpalgaon. Cowherds bought their cattle near the temple to let them drink water, and they found the saint meditating inside the temple. He was later brought to Pimpalgaon the next day, in a palanquin with great pomp and show. The villagers underwent fasting to remove the saint from his trance. News of a new saint being discovered in Pimpalgaon reached Shegaon via the merchants. Bankatlal Agarwal then went to Pimpalgaon to take the saint back to Shegaon. Sri Gajanan left Shegaon again after a few days. He left for Adgaon. A farmer called Bhaskar Patil was working hard in the fields. Water was quite scarce in the area. Maharaj asked Bhaskar to give him some water to drink. Bhaskar denied and scorned Maharaj for being a burden to society. The saint later came across a well, which Bhaskar told Maharaj was dry. Maharaj then sat down near the well and meditated, imploring god to fill the well, for the sake of society. The well burst forth with water. Bhaskar regretting being cold with the saint, and begged Maharaj to forgive him. Bhaskar cultivated a garden in devotion to the saint. Later Bhaskar Patil came to Shegaon, along with Sri Gajanan Maharaj.

Chapter 6

In this Chapter, Sri Gajanan Maharaj, along with Bankatlal Agarwal, went to his farm to enjoy some roasted corns. The smoke from the lit campfires angered the bees in the beehives on the trees, and they began attacking everyone in the vicinity. Maharaj sat quietly under the tree, even though the bees were attacking him too. After the bees had stopped attacking, on the insistence of Maharaj. Everyone saw Maharaj, and Bankatlal asked for a goldsmith to remove all the thorns in his body. Maharaj then held his breath, then all the thorns fell out of his body. Maharaj left Shegaon, to meet Sri Narsingji in a dense forest near Akot. They both discussed about yoga, and bhakti. Maharaj stayed the night, talking with Sri Narsinghji, and left the next morning. Maharaj now reached a town called Shivar, on the banks of the river Chandrabhaga. He blessed a learned man, Vrajbhushan. Maharaj returned to Shegaon, after visiting many places. He left Bankatlal Agarwal's house to live in a temple. The author also gives an account of the politics in Shegaon, with the Patils of Shegaon having significant power. The festival of shravan, which saw annual functions at the Hanuman temple, were conducted by people to impress the Patil.

Chapter 7

in chapter seven, Patils of the village begin pestering Sri Gajanan Maharaj unknowing of his divinity, and Hari Patil challenged Maharaj to a wrestling bout, in which Maharaj could not even be moved by Sri Gajanan Maharaj. Later Hari Patil surrendered himself to Sri Gajanan Maharaj. The Patil boys, other than Hari Patil, approached Maharaj with Sugarcane Stalks, telling him that he was a true saint, he would not feel any pain and would not cause marks to appear on his body. The Patil Boys began beating Maharaj, who sat aloof and did not feel anything. Later, Maharaj took the sugarcane stalks, and wrenched them to pour some sugarcane juice for the exhausted Patil boys. Later, Kukaji Patil called Khandu Patil, asking him to ask the saint for a child. Khandu Patil, after a discussion with Maharaj got a child, but on the condition that he be names Bhikya, and to feed aamras to Brahmins every year. The chapter elaborates a rivalry within the two families of Shegaon, the Deshmukhs and the Patils.

Chapter 8

Khandu Patil, who had some work, ordered Marya Mahar to deliver a mail to the Akola Police Station. Marya, being a man of the Deshmukh's side, denied taking the work, and insulted Khandu Patil, which resulted in Khandu Patil hitting Marya hard on his hand. Marya Mahar was taken to the Deshmukhs, who lodged a complaint. Khandu Patil was about to be arrested. He went to Sri Gajanan Maharaj, and told his recent development to Maharaj, asking him to take his sword and kill him, rather than ruin his honour by arrest. Maharaj consoled him, saying that he has not committed any wrongdoing, therefore he would not face arrest. Patil did not get arrested, and later took Maharaj to stay at their place. Some Telangi Brahmins came to Shegaon, and recited verses of the Vedas while Maharaj was asleep, to awaken the saint. The recitation had a mistake, and caused Maharaj to wake up, and recite the same verse again without any mistakes and he criticised the Brahmins for using Vedic Hymns for the sake of business. Maharaj later left the temple and moved to a garden north of Shegaon, which was property of Krishnaji Patil. Patil put up a tin shed for Maharaj, and Bhaskar and Tukaram Kokate took care of him. Once, twenty ascetics came to the garden, hearing about Sri Gajanan Maharaj. They were the disciples of Sri Brahmagiri, and began a pravachan about the verses of the Bhagwat Geeta. Later, the cot on which Maharaj was sitting caught fire, causing Bhaskar to panic, and tell Maharaj to get up from the cot. However, Maharaj asked Brahmagiri Maharaj to come sit with him on the burning cot, as he said that the soul is immortal, and fire shall not harm Brahma. Bhaskar began dragging Brahmagiri Maharaj, causing Brahmagiri Maharaj to confess his fraudulent intentions of touring only for the sake of Prasad offered. Maharaj told Brahmagiri to shun all worldly pleasures, and quietly left the place with his disciples.

Chapter 9

In this chapter, Govindbua Taklikar arrives in Shegaon for performing a Kirtan in Mote's Temple in Shegaon. He had a horse, who was known for his ill behavior and violent nature. In the middle of night, Sri Gajanan Maharaj walks to the place the horse was leashed, and slept under the horse. Govindbua Taklikar wakes up in the middle of the night, to check on the silence of the horse and sees Maharaj sleeping under the horse. Later on Maharaj tells the horse to act like a bull before Shiva. Maharaj curtly reminded two Brahmins of their forgotten promises to bring Marijuana to the saint as an offering.

Balkrishna, a devotee of Ramdas Swami from Balapur, who went on a pilgrimage to Sajjangad, annually was upset when his age did not permit him to travel far anymore. Later Sri Gajanan Maharaj appeared to him in a dream and told him he need not travel to Sajjangad to celebrate Das Navami, but can organize a celebration in Balapur itself. Next year, Sri Maharaj himself came to Balapur to Balkrishna's house, appearing the balkrishna as both Ramdas Swami and Gajanan Maharaj. Balkrishna worshipped Maharaj, but still felt upset that Ramdas Swami had not come to his event as promised. This was resolved when Gajanan Maharaj appeared in his dream and told him that Ramdas Swami and he—were the same.

Chapter 10

Sri Gajanan Maharaj visited Amravati, and went to the homes of devotees, like Atmaram Bhikaji and Ganesh Appa. Maharaj gets a disciple, Balbhau, who was the nephew of Atmaram Bhikaji. Maharaj later returned to a piece of land adjacent to the temple, instead of the garden, causing Krishnaji Patil to ask Maharaj quite emotionally what he had done to insult Maharaj. Maharaj was quite calm, and told him not to feel so upset as this was for Patil's benefit. Bhaskar Patil was skeptical about Balbhau, thinking that he only stays for getting sweets and Prasad. This was put to the test by Sri Gajanan Maharaj. Maharaj began assaulting Balbhau with an umbrella, then with his bare hands. Later, due to the insistence of devotees, Maharaj stopped the thrashing, and asked Balbhau to show his back for the marks due to the thrashing. There were none. Maharaj also calmed down a cow that was extremely troublesome to its owners, and was brought to Maharaj tied up in chains. Maharaj was visited by the wife of Laxmanrao Ghude, who was a rich Brahmin, living in Karanja. He had a stomach ailment. Maharaj gave her a mango to offer Laxman. After eating it, Laxman began recovering, and invited Maharaj to his house. He told Maharaj that everything in his house belongs to Maharaj and offered coins to Maharaj. Maharaj then told Ghude to remove all the locks to his vaults. Ghude did so, but unwillingly. Maharaj realized his hypocrisy and left immediately.

Chapter 11

In this chapter, Sri Gajanan Maharaj, along with his disciples go to Balapur to attend Ram Navami celebrations by Balkrishna. A rabid dog bit Bhaskar Patil, to which Maharaj revealed that Bhaskar Patil's death was at nigh. Patil tells Maharaj to protect him from Rabies until his destined time of death. Maharaj agrees to do so. Bhaskar Patil insists devotees of Maharaj to build a memorial in honor of Sri Gajanan Maharaj. Later, Sri Gajanan Maharaj leave Shegaon to visit religious places. They visit Nashik, Trimbakeshwar and Adgaon. At Adgaon, Maharaj finally tells Bhaskar that his death is near, and to sit in lotus position while chanting the name of Narayana. Bhaskar is soon dead. His body is buried beside Sati Mata mandir on the directions of Maharaj. Prasad is distributed for ten days. Maharaj later returns to Shegaon, where he saves Ganu Javrya from certain death, after he was stuck in a well which was undergoing digging via explosives.

Chapter 12

Maharaj visits Bacchulal Agarwal in the beginning of the chapter, who gifts him considerable items, all of which Maharaj refuses. He blesses him on his effort to build a temple of Ram to celebrate Ram Navami. A devotee of Sri Gajanan Maharaj, Pitamber Shimpi, was scolded by Maharaj because he wore a tattered dhoti. Maharaj later gave him a dupatta to wear. Pitamber was scorned for doing so by other fellow devotees. Later, Maharaj tells Pitamber to go away from Shegaon to help liberate other people. Pitamber leaves Shegaon and reaches Kondholi. He sits down under a tree, uttering the saint's name. Ants bothered him, and he began climbing up the tree. The inhabitants of Kondholi were skeptical of Pitmbar, and the Deshmukh of the village challenged him to create new leaves on the dry mango tree he was climbing on. He prayed fervently to Sri Gajanan Maharaj and leaves sprouted to the Mango tree. The villagers took Pitamber in gladly, after he proved his devotion to Maharaj. Maharaj later became tired of living in Shegaon, but was convinced not to leave it by Bankatlal and other devotees. They decided to build a new monastery for Sri Gajanan Maharaj, and began to organize donating campaigns and construction work.

Chapter 13

The devotees of Sri Gajanan Maharaj began collecting donations for building the new math of Sri Gajanan Maharaj. The devotees received some pushback for their collection, questioning if Maharaj is truly divine, he could just conjure money from thin air. The Devotees headed by Jagdeo Patil said that the point of collecting donations was to make the people contributing feel important. Maharaj had no care in the world for the building of his monastery, for the whole world was his abode, and could go as he pleases. Maharaj later went to the construction site of the Math to speed up construction work. The work was allocated only one acre, but the complete work needed 2 acres, so encroachment was done. This was reported and officer Joshi from the revenue department would investigate the matter. To this, Maharaj assured all the devotees that the fine incurred would be exempted. Later, a Gosavi, by the name of Gangabharati came to the Math of Shegaon, to treat by divine methods, his Leprosy, Maharaj's devotees shunned him from entering the Monastery of Maharaj, but Maharaj still blessed him, and he recovered from his Leprosy completely, and decided to stay in Shegaon, and dedicate himself to Maharaj. Pundalik, who was undertaking a pilgrimage to Shegaon with his father, suffered from the Bubonic Plague. He somehow reached Shegaon, where Sri Gajanan Maharaj cured him, and saved his life.

Chapter 14

A Brahmin called Bandutatya loses all his wealth due to his devotion to his guests, which leads him to contemplate suicide. He smears ash all over his body, dons a loincloth and goes to the railway station to book a ticket to Haridwar, when he was interrupted by a Brahmin, telling him not to take such a major decision without meeting a saint. Bandu Tatya went to Meet Sri Gajanan Maharaj. Maharaj told him not to take such a choice, as his suicide will not remove the sufferings of his life, which are destined for a person. Maharaj told Bandu Tatya to go to his field, and dig under an Acacia Tree, at midnight. Bandu Tatya did so, and found a pot full of gold coins, with which he paid off all creditors and repaid the mortgage of his house. Maharaj was approached by Banktatlal, Martand Patil and other devotees, insisting him to travel with them to Onkareshwar to bathe in the river Narmada on the occasion of Somavati Amavsya. Maharaj was reluctant to do so, but still went with them. The devotees went up to the temple, while Maharaj stayed near the banks meditating in the Padmasan position. Later, the devotees and Maharaj left Onkareshwar by boat. The Boat went over some rapids, the hull of the boat was damaged, and the boat began sinking. Maharaj was beseeched by his devotees to forgive them for forcing him to come with them, but Maharaj pacified them, and after that a woman, dressed as a fisherwoman, wet, from waist deep, held her hand on the hole in the boat and guided the boat safely to the river bank, and after that, greeted Sri Gajanan Maharaj. Later she disappeared. Maharaj later had meals with another saint from Malwa- Sreenath, while Sree Nath was not in Shegaon.

Chapter 15

Bal Gangadhar Tilak, an Indian Freedom Fighter is invited to an Shiv Jayanti Celebration in Akola. Maharaj is also invited later on. Tilak begins a rousing speech against the British Government, and Maharaj warns Tilak that he could face arrest because of this. Later Bal Gangadhar Tilak was arrested on the charges of Sedition and his trial began in Bombay. Dadasaheb Khaparde, sent Kolhatkar to Shegaon to consult Sri Gajanan Maharaj. Maharaj was sleeping since three days, and later woke up to tell Kolhatkar that their efforts to save Tilak would be fruitless, and to take this piece of Bhakri as prasad to Bal Gangadhar Tilak. Later, Tilak was sent to Mandalay(Myammar), where, Tilak wrote the Geeta Rahasya, which was acclaimed by scholars, and was the source of numerous commentaries. Later on, Maharaj meets a young Brahmin youth, Shridhar Kale came to meet Maharaj, after he failed his Inter, and was confused what to do next, as he had no money to go abroad and learn technical training. Maharaj told Shridhar to not bother with learning materialistic skills, and to study Yogashastra. Shridhar Kale later passed his B.A. and M.A. exams, and became a college principal at Shivapuri.

Chapter 16

Bhagabai, a rather hypocrite woman criticized Pundalik Bhokre, saying that his Guru is not a genuine one, and genuine ones tell a Guru Mantra in the devotees’ ears. She told Pundalik to come with him to Anjangao, to make the disciple of Kakaji their guru. Pundalik agrees and later goes to bed. Sri Gajanan Maharaj appears in his dreams, and curtails his doubts. Maharaj asks Pundalik what he wants, to which Pundalik replies that he needs only his Padukas for worship. Later, Zyam Singh was told by Balbhau in Shegaon to take Padukas with him to Mundgaon. Pundalik asks Zyam Singh if Maharaj gave something for him, to which Zyam Singh handed over the Padukas to Pundalik. Rajaram Kavar was a dealer of Gold and Silver, of the Brahmin Community. and his sons, were devotees of Maharaj. The youngest, Bhau Kavar studied in the Medical College of Hyderabad, and wished to offer food to Maharaj. He faced difficulty for this due to his mother dying prematurely, and his sister-in-law being of a violent temper. Bhau was approached by his sister-in-law herself and she made food for the offering to Maharaj. Bhau Kavar left for the station to catch the Train to Shegaon, but he missed it. The next train was three hours later, and Bhau became depressed, and began crying. He went to Shegaon on the next train. Bhau found out that Maharaj had not touched any of the food that was offered to him, and had waited for Bhau to come. Maharaj accepted the food and gave some as prasad. Tukaram Shegokar was a poor farmer who was working in the fields early morning, and was warming up near a campfire. A hunter, in an attempt to shoot a rabbit fired his gun, but a piece of Shrapnel entered Shegokar's head. He could not sleep peacefully, and people advised him to work in the Monastery, to keep it clean and well-maintained. Shegokar kept the Monastery clean for fourteen years, and one day the bullet fell out from his head.

Chapter 17

Bhaskar Patil, requested Maharaj to travel to Malkapur, although Maharaj was reluctant, he did accept the offer. At the station, Maharaj was supposed to sit in a vacated coach, but Maharaj entered the ladies’ compartment. Police reported this matter to Maharaj, and later, on the request of the Station Master, Maharaj got down from the coach. The matter was held up in court. Maharaj was held for trial, and came to the court, and sat for his hearing naked. Shri Jathar, who was the judge, said later that he has attained a state of bliss and sainthood, and must not be charged with any offence. The Court then fined Bhaskar Patil five rupees as a penalty. Maharaj once came to Akola, and a Muslim saint, Mehtabshah wanted to meet Sri Gajanan Maharaj. Mehtabshah was beaten by Shri Gajanan Maharaj, to make sure that he stayed away from Malice and justified his name. Mehtabshah was not invited for taking meals Seth Bachulal, and because of this, Maharaj did not descend from his cart. Later Mehtabshah was invited, and Maharaj came happily to take meals. After meals, Maharaj told Mehtabshah to leave for Punjab to maintain Hindu-Muslim relations there. Bapurao's wife suffered from Bhanamati and Bapurao spent a considerable amount of money trying to cure her. Later Bapurao approached Maharaj for this, and Maharaj removed her Bhanamati. Maharaj also visited Narsingji and as he sat by a nearby well, was bathed in the waters of the holy rivers Ganga, Yamuna and Godavari.

Chapter 18

Baijabai Mali, was a young girl from Mundgaon, who was married, but her husband was infertile. Baijabai was left at her husband's place, and her elder brother-in-law, was attracted by her, and tried making advances on her. The Brother-in-law came to her place to let her know his intentions, and Baija turned his offer down. He tried to take her by force, when his elder son fell on the ground from the first floor, causing a major injury. Baija took care of him immediately, which made the elder brother-in-law stop his advances. Later Baija and her parents went to Shegaon, during which Sri Gajanan Maharaj told them that she is not destined for a child. Baija began going to Shegaon from Mundgaon along with Pundalik Bhokar, which raised gossip about adultery and caste-related violations. Once again Baija and her parents went to Shegaon, where Maharaj revealed that Pundalik actually is her brother and to let Baija come to Shegaon along with Pundalik without any obstruction.

Bhau Kavar, who was a doctor, had a severe boil on his body, which caused him discomfort. Many medical procedures were tried, but they were unsuccessful, and he was lying restless in pain. His elder brother thought of Sri Gajanan Maharaj. Later a brahmin arrived at their house at midnight, calling himself Gaja, and bringing Tirtha and Angara for Bhau Kavar. The brahmin left soon after. Bhau cover completely recovered from his ailment and later went to meet Sri Gajanan Maharaj, who revealed that he indeed was the brahmin.

Maharaj later went with his devotees to Pandharpur, passing through Nagzari. Later Maharaj reached Pandharpur. All the devotees went for Darshan, but Bapuna Kale was left behind and he didn't get a darshan. Maharaj took him aside, and showed him the exact same statue as in the temple. Later, a bout of Cholera broke out in Pandharpur, and doctors forced people out of the city. The devotees of Maharaj prepared to leave, but Maharaj told them to wait for him, as he asked them to take Kawathe Bahadur, a man from Varhad, but inflicted with Cholera. Maharaj recovered him from his Cholera and later went back to Shegaon.

An Orthodox Brahmin once came to Shegaon and was disappointed when Sri Gajanan Maharaj did not fulfill his expectations. Later during his morning pooja, he saw a dead dog lying beside a well, and became angry about this. Maharaj later touched the dog with his feet, and the dog woke up and went away, causing the brahmin to fall prostrate at Maharaj's feet.

Chapter 19

In this chapter, Sri Gajanan Maharaj signals his devotee about his new job posting. Maharaj went to Nagpur to the residence of Govind Buti, who denied Maharaj leaving his place to return to Shegaon. Later, Hari Patil went to Nagpur to Govind Buti, to take Maharaj back to Shegaon. Maharaj went back to Shegaon, although he did take his meals there, and blessed Govind Buti's wife. He also visited Raghuji Raj Bhosle. Maharaj spoke at length about the different ways of salvation, namely, Yoga, Bhakti and Karma margas(ways) with Balbhau. Maharaj tells at length about the ways of each marga and its characteristics. Maharaj told Salubhai, a devotee to keep cooking prasad for devotees. Maharaj corrected the recitation of Vedas by Atmaram, who went to Kashi(Varanasi) to study the Vedas.

One night Timaji, a servant under Maruti Patwari, who watched over the fields at night, fell asleep, and donkeys began eating the produce. Maharaj quickly roused Timaji, who drove off the donkeys. Later Timaji himself went to Maruti Patwari about the damage incurred, which Maruti told would look into after visiting Sri Gajanan Maharaj. Maharaj told Maruti about the incident, how he ran to the field to rouse Timaji. Maruti realized this and thanked the saint.

In Balapur, Maharaj was sitting naked in a street, and passerbys paid their respects to the saint. A police constable, Narayan Asirji began beating maharaj, until marks became visible on the saint's body. Later, the Havaldar and his relatives died within a fortnight. A brahmin, called Hari Jakhadya, who moved place to place, asked Maharaj to bless him for a stable married life and children, due to which Maharaj spat on him, but blessed him. In Kapildhara, a man called Nimonkar, who was a Yoga scholar met Shri Gajanan Maharaj there. Maharaj gave Nimonkar a chart and a red stone telling him to practice in front of the stone, and repeat the hymns on the chart. Later Nimonkar met Maharaj near Nashik's Godavari river, and met Maharaj in Lawyer Dhumal's residence. Tukaram Kokate suffered misfortune of losing his children, and he promised Maharaj a child of those that survived. Later, Tukaram had three children, and Tukaram forgot his promise, resulting in his eldest son, Narayan falling mortally sick. Narayan was given to Shri Gajanan Maharaj, to honour his promise.

Maharaj and Hari Patil went to Pandharpur to visit Vithhal, where Maharaj requested passage to Vaikunta, as all his work was done, and began weeping. This worried Hari Patil, who was consoled by Maharaj. Maharaj told his devotees to immerse him in water after the day of Ganesh Chaturthi. Later that day, Maharaj held Balbhau's hand, and told him to continue his devotion, then held his breath, and left his body, while uttering, “Jay Gajanan”. Later, devotees began weeping, and a Chariot was arranged to tour Maharaj's body around Shegaon. Devotees who lived away from Shegaon received this news from dreams. The Chariot went round town all night, while many offered prasadam and sweets in the name of Maharaj. Maharaj was later buried underneath his Samadhi. Prayers were offered for ten days, and many devotees participated.

Chapter 20

After the Samadhi of Maharaj, many people thought Shegaon was desolate and had nothing now. A man, Kothade wanted to perform an abhishek on the occasion of Vijaya Dashami, which was criticised by his wife, insisting him to buy clothes for their children. Sri Gajanan Maharaj later appeared in her dreams, telling her to let her husband perform Abhishek, and do not harass him. Laxman Hari Janjal, a devotee of Sri Gajanan Maharaj, went to Mumbai and he was disturbed due to domestic problems. He was approached by a sage on Bori Bunder Station, who inquired about his frustration. The sage motivated Laxman Hari Janjal to keep headfast and devote life to the saint. The sage on the station was indeed Sri Gajanan Maharaj. Madhav Martand Joshi, who was a government officer, departed for Shegaon in a bullock cart, and his servant, Quttubiddin, told Joshi that the weather was terrible, with the river being flooded. Joshi ignored his warning and got in the cart. The storm became severe, and the cart entered the Man river, water began to enter the cart, causing Qutubuddin and Joshi to pray to Maharaj. Later the cart safely came out on the other side. Joshi reached Shegaon and fed brahmins as per his taken vow. Yadav Ganesh Subedhar was a cotton broker, who faced a loss of ten thousand rupees in brokerage, causing his health and well-being to suffer. He went to his friend, Asirkar, where a beggar came, asking for alms. The beggar was reluctant to go to the back door to receive alms, and Subedhar looked that the beggar. He looked like Sri Gajanan Maharaj, and Subedhar gave him alms. The beggar told Subedhar to remove his clothes, so he could remove his ailments. Later, Subedhar got a good profit in his business.

Doctor Bhau Kavar, who came to Shegaon, took the Darshan of Maharaj, and later asked Balbhau about departing Shegaon, without taking prasad and on Vyadhipath. Balbhau told them not to do so, but Bhau Kavar still left. Later the cart missed the road, and strayed into a narrow path ending in a lake. Bhau began abusing the driver, who protested, and later told Bhau that he knew the path, and could not understand how were they lost. Kavar realized that this was due to him leaving Shegaon without their prasad. They later returned to Shegaon, and left the next day after taking Prasad. Ratansa Bhavsar had a son, who was sick. He implored Maharaj after all medical attempts failed. He promised Maharaj sweets of Five rupees, if his son recovered. The child recovered and began crying. Ramchandra Patil's wife, who had a painful childbirth, now was infected with Typhoid, and other ailments. Her mental stability was affected. Ramchandra Patil told her to worship Sri Gajanan Maharaj, and take the Darshan of his Samadhi every morning. She was cured of her ailments. After Balbhau took the place of Sri Gajanan Maharaj, and after him, Narayan took his place.

Chapter 21

This is the final chapter of the Gajanan Vijay. During construction of the temple, a worker fell down, while giving bricks to the mason. He fell about thirty feet, but still emerged unscathed, saying that someone held his hand firmly while he was falling. A lady from Jaipur, who was suffering from an evil spirit, came to Shegaon during Ramnavmi. People thronged in the temple to celebrate the birth of Sri Ram. The lady was under a massive stone pillar, and due to the crowd, the pillar fell on her and her children. She was taken to Dr Lobo, who examined her, and found out no injuries or issues with her. Later her affliction with evil spirits also was cured. Ramchandra Patil, son of Krishnaji Patil, was a devotee of Maharaj. One day an ascetic visited him, and Patil gave him a plank to sit on. the ascetic consoled Patil, giving him instructions to look after the Sansthan of Sri Gajanan Maharaj. Later, Patil tied a Talisman on the neck of Patil's son, and left.

The chapter summarises the complete book, with there being an account for each chapter. The chapter lists the major donors who contributed for the construction of the temple, whose account is also given. A fire worship, or Yajnya was performed in front of the Samadhi of Majaraj under great tension. Bankatlal fell mortally sick, and his son grew concerned. Bankatlal consoled him and told him to perform the pooja. Many Yajyas were performed in front of the Samadhi of Maharaj. The chapter later tells about the divinity of Sri Gajanan Maharaj, and the divinity of the book, and ways of worshipping Sri Gajanan Maharaj. Later the author, Sri Dasganu Maharaj tells about how he wrote this book with reference from papers Ratansa provided.

== Publication history ==
The book is published by The Sri Gajanan Maharaj Sanstan, who owns the rights to this book.

Translated versions in English, Hindi, Tamil, Telugu and Gujrati are also published by the Gajanan Maharaj Sansthan.
