= Gajanan Maharaj =

Hindu guru from western Indian state of Maharashtra (1878 - 1910)

Shri Gajanan Maharaj
- Sadguru Shri Gajanan Maharaj
- Born: Shegaon
- Died: September 8, 1910 (aged 32); Shegaon, Central Provinces and Berar, British India

Gajanan Maharaj (23 February 1878 - 8 September 1910) was an Indian Hindu guru, saint and mystic. His origins remain uncertain. He first appeared at Shegaon, a village in Buldhana district, Maharashtra, as a young man aged 30, probably on 23 February 1878. He attained Sanjeevana Samadhi on 8 September 1910, which is thought to be a process of voluntary withdrawal from one's physical body. This date of his Samadhi is commemorated every year as part of the Shree Punyatithi Utsav. The date of his first appearance is considered an auspicious day and is celebrated as Prakat Din Sohla.

== Background and biographical versions ==
Shri Sant Gajanan Maharaj, Shegaon.

Gajanan Maharaj's birth data and details of his early life are unknown. He is believed to have first appeared in February 1878 at Shegaon.

One of his biographies, known as Shree Gajanan Maharaj Charitra-Kosh, was written by Dasbhargav or Bhargavram Yeodekar, a native of Shegaon. The biography mentions various versions of Gajanan Maharaj's origins. While at Nashik, Dasbhargav is thought to have met a contemporary saint known as Swami Shivanand Saraswati, who was speculated to be 129 years old at the time. According to Shivanand, he was a Brahmin who had previously met Gajanan Maharaj in 1887 at Nashik. He informed Dasbhargav about the period when Gajanan Maharaj appeared in Shegaon, where he lived for the remainder of his life. He said he had made around 25 to 30 visits to Gajanan Maharaj during this period. Shivanand Swami also said that he would often visit Dadasaheb Khaparde, a resident at Amravati, and stay with his family during these visits. It is noted that Shivanand Swami later traveled to the Himalayas and was never seen again (according to pages 362–365 of the biography mentioned above that details the conversation between Dasbhargav and Shivanand Swami). It is also believed that Shivanand Swami may have been a former resident at Sajjangad, Maharashtra, where the prominent 17th-century saint and philosopher Samarth Ramdas lived for many years. Gajanan Maharaj was an ardent user of marijuana and hashish, exemplified in almost all available images in the public domain from the time of his attaining samadhi. Even the temple premises where he attained samadhi and his sitting position with one hand at the top, showing like an elephant a symbolic representation of Shri Ganapathy Dev. Gajanan Maharaj did so many supernatural miracles in His life; some were captured in His spiritual biographical scriptures like Gajanan Maharaj Charitra Kosh and Gajanan Vijay.

Another biography of Gajanan Maharaj, known as Shree Gajanan Vijay, was composed by Das Ganu, born at Akolner. Das Ganu, who was initially named Narayan by his maternal relatives, had at some point moved to Ahilyanagar, Maharashtra, where his father had been a caretaker of a property. He was later renamed Ganesh, and his grandfather often called him Ganu, a shorter version of his name. When he arrived at Pandharpur, Das Ganu was contacted by a resident at Shegaon, Ramchandra Krishnaji Patil, also a devotee of Gajanan Maharaj. He advised Das Ganu to write a biography on Gajanan Maharaj.

He was believed to have once visited Nashik, Maharashtra, and the surrounding pilgrimage sites, including Kapiltirtha. He lived at Kapiltirtha for around 12 years. Contemporaries of Gajanan Maharaj identified him by several names, including Gin Gine Buwa, Ganpat Buwa, and Awaliya Baba.

== Parallels with other prominent saints and spiritual masters ==
According to his biography, Shree Gajanan Vijay, Gajanan Maharaj used to consider a few other spiritual personalities such as Narasimha Saraswati, Vasudevanand Saraswati (Tembhe Swami Maharaj), and Sai Baba of Shirdi as brothers. Gajanan Maharaj appeared as Vitthala in Pandharapur for his devotee Bapuna Kale. He also appeared as Samarth Ramdas for another devotee.

There are some similarities between Gajanan Maharaj and Swami Samarth of Akkalkot, another Hindu guru and mystic. They both were Paramahans and Ajanbahu. They represent different forms taken from the same source.

He is regarded as an enlightened being and received a significant following in Maharashtra; lacs of people visit the Shegaon temple annually. According to Shree Gajanan Vijay Granth, he was an exponent of three streams of Yoga, i.e. Karma, Bhakti, and Gyan Yoga.

== Appearances and Divine Powers ==
=== First Appearance ===
According to Shree Gajanan Vijay Granth (Stotra 1), a moneylender named Bankat Lal Agarwal first saw Gajanan Maharaj on 23 February 1878 in a superconscious state. He was found sitting on a street in Shegaon, eating leftover food thrown away by others, which devotees interpreted as a divine message: food is sacred and should never be wasted.

=== Miracles and Yogic Powers ===
Gajanan Maharaj is credited with performing many miracles, several of which are detailed in the sacred Granth. These incredible acts include giving a fresh lease on life to Janrao Deshmukh, who was believed to be dead. He demonstrated divine power by lighting a clay chillum without fire and miraculously filling a completely dry well with water after being denied a drink. Furthermore, he was able to extract sugarcane juice with his bare hands. His compassion extended to healing, as he cured a man of leprosy through his blessings. Finally, his divine resilience was shown when he bore multiple honeybee stings without requiring treatment and healed himself.

These acts are attributed to his mastery over Yoga Shastra, as mentioned by Das Ganu Maharaj, the author of the Gajanan Vijay Granth.

=== Blessings to Lokmanya Tilak ===
During a public event on Shiv Jayanti, Gajanan Maharaj met freedom fighter Lokmanya Tilak. After Tilak delivered a passionate speech, Maharaj is said to have predicted that he would face harsh punishment under British rule. The prediction came true. Before his sentencing, Tilak sought blessings and Prasad from Maharaj, which is believed to have given him strength to write Shrimadh Bhagavad Gita Rahasya, his interpretation of the Bhagavad Gita.

=== Samadhi and Eternal Presence ===
On 8 September 1910, Gajanan Maharaj took Samadhi. His mortal remains were buried at Shegaon, where a temple was constructed in his honor, as per his earlier prediction about the end of his earthly journey. This temple was being prepared even before his Samadhi. His Samadhi Mandir is directly below the temple of Shri Ram, whom Maharaj worshipped regularly.

=== The Chillum and the Devotee’s Vow ===
There’s a popular story from the Granth and oral tradition about Maharaj and the chillum:

A devotee from Kashi had taken a navas (vow) to offer ganja to Gajanan Maharaj if his wish came true. When it did, he came to Shegaon but was ashamed to offer ganja publicly due to Maharaj's divine reputation. As he stood hesitantly, Maharaj addressed him:

> Maharaj: "आत्ता गांजा अनलायस तर मला दे!" <-> (Now that you've brought the ganja, give it to me!)

> Devotee: "नाही महाराज, मला लाज वाटे." <-> (No Maharaj, I feel ashamed.)

> Maharaj: "नवस घेतला तेव्हा लाज नाही वाटली का?" <-> (You didn’t feel ashamed when you made the vow?)

> Devotee: "मी ते आता देईन, पण कृपया वचन द्या की तुम्ही व्यसनाधीन होणार नाही आणि मी जे आणले आहे तेच वापरा." <-> (I’ll give it now, but please promise you won’t become addicted, and only use what I brought.)

Maharaj accepted the offering, showing his compassion and refusal to hurt the feelings of true devotees. This event is often cited as the origin of the image of Gajanan Maharaj with a chillum.

=== The Eternal Dhooni ===
The dhooni (sacred fire) started by Maharaj, representing his divine energy, still burns today near his Samadhi Mandir. It is a spiritual beacon for followers who believe it embodies his continued presence.

=== Devotees and Legacy ===
After Maharaj miraculously filled a dry well with water, the saint who earlier refused him water—Bhaskar Maharaj Jayle—became his ardent devotee. His lineage continued devotion to Maharaj, including his grandson Vasudeva Maharaj Jayle, who founded the Shraddhasagar Ashram in Akot.

== Shri Sant Gajanan Maharaj Sansthan ==
In the presence of Gajanan Maharaj, Shri Sant Gajanan Maharaj Sansthan, a body of 12 trustees, was formed on 12 September 1908 to commemorate the holy place that Maharaj had hinted at with Ya Jagi Rahil Re (It will be at this place) about his place and day for Samadhi. Shri Gajanan Maharaj Mandir is located below the temple of Shri Ram. In the same area, there is the place where the Dhooni is burning. Also nearby, the Dhooni is where the devotees can see Maharaj's paduka (wooden sandals), the temple of Vithoba and Rukmini, and the temple of Hanuman. There is an umbar tree just near the temple of Hanuman, which is said to have existed since the days of Shri Gajanan Maharaj.

Shivshankar Patil had been the head of the trust. Educational institutions run by the trust are located at Shegaon and are affiliated with Amravati University. These colleges are one of the best institutes for engineering education in the Vidarbha region. The Anand Sagar project for tourists was developed in 2005 by the trust and spans over 650 acres. It is one of the largest amusement places in Maharashtra. Shegaon is on the main staion on the Mumbai-Howrah route. Most trains going to Howrah, stop for around 2–3 minutes at Shegaon Railway Station.

Gajanan Maharaj Temples are spread in various parts of India, such as Indore and Dewas.
