= Shiv Jayanti =

Festival and holiday in Maharashtra, India

Chatrapati Shivaji Maharaj Jayanti
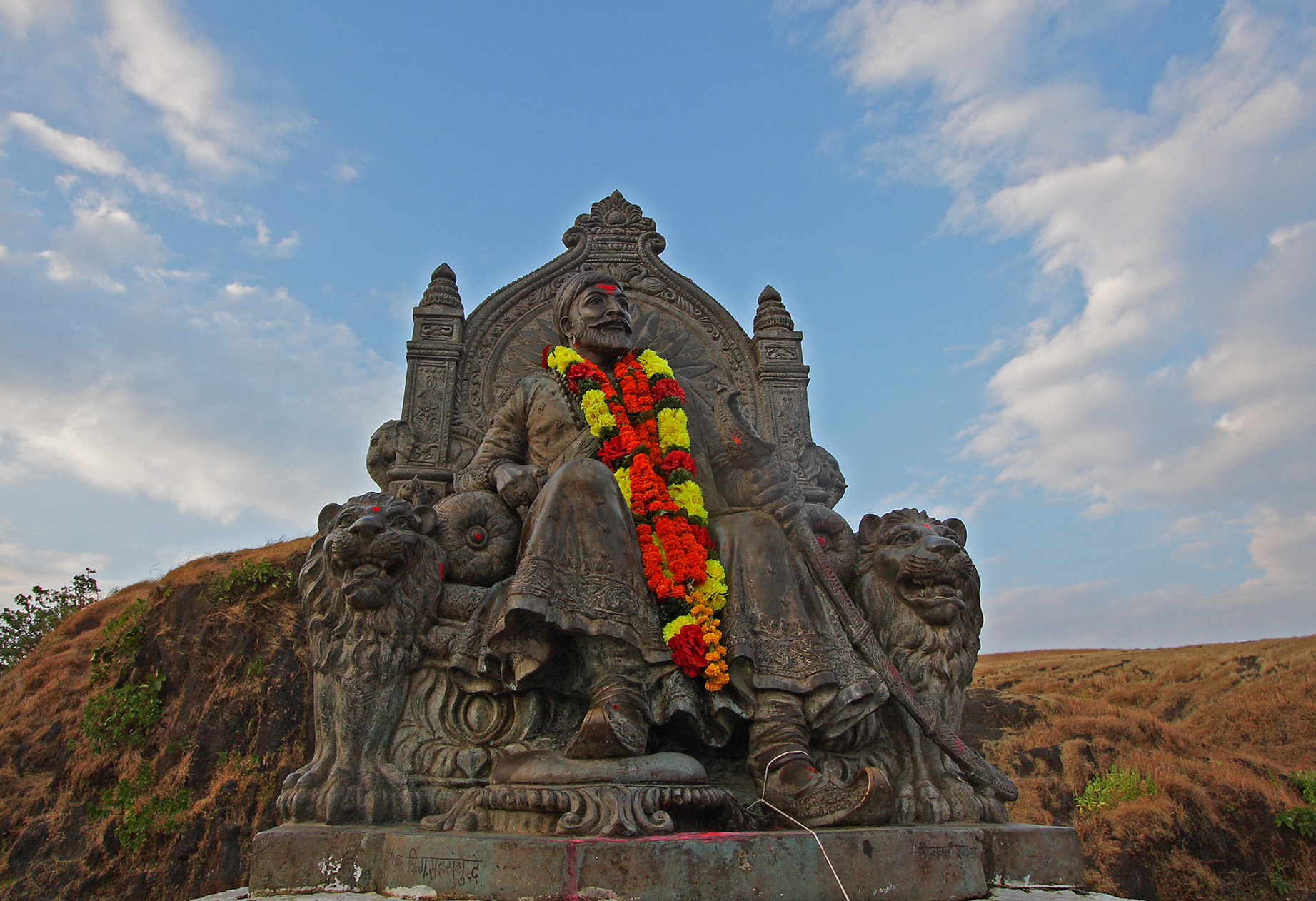
- Statue of Chatrapati Shiv Maharaj at Raigad
- Official name: Chhatrapati Shivaji Jayanti
- Also called: Shivajayanti, Chhatrapati Shivaji Maharaj birth anniversary
- Observed by: Predominantly Maharashtrians also celebrated in other parts of India
- Liturgical color: Saffron representing the flag of the Swarajya
- Type: Historic, nationalistic
- Significance: Celebrates the birth anniversary of Chatrapati Shivaji Maharaj
- Celebrations: 1 Day
- Observances: 2 times a year
- Date: February 19th
- Duration: 1 Day
- Frequency: Annual
- Started by: Mahatma Jyotirao Phule
- Related to: Chatrapati Shivaji Maharaj, Maratha Empire

Shiv Jayanti, also known as Chhatrapati Shivaji Maharaj Jayanti, is a festival and public holiday of the Indian state of Maharashtra. This festival is celebrated on February 19, celebrating the birth anniversary of Chatrapati Shivaji Maharaj, the first Chhatrapati of the Marathas. He established Hindavi Swarajya (Swarājya; "Self-Rule of the Hindu people"). People celebrate this day by huge gatherings and processions for celebrating the birth of Chatrapati Shivaji Maharaj.

After referring to the official documents received from the royal courts of various maratha sardars, including Bhosales of Nagpur, Gaikwads of Badoda, which clearly mentioned the birth tithi of Chatrapati Shivaji Maharaj as 'Falguna Vadya Trutiya', the corresponding date as 19th Feb 1630, in 1912 AD and started the widespread annual Shivjayanti celebrations.

== History ==
In 1870, social reformer Mahatma Jyotirao Phule initiated the celebration Shiv Jayanti in Pune which is now known as Chhatrapati Shivaji Maharaj Jayanti. In 1869, Mahatma Jyotiba Phule, with great effort, discovered the lost samadhi of Shivaji hidden amidst the trees and bushes in Palapacholy. He cleaned the samadhi and adorned it with flowers. He had discovered the tomb of Shivaji Maharaj on Raigad, from around 100 km from Pune. At the Shiv Samadhi gathering held in Hirabag at Pune, Jyotirao shared details about the samadhi. In that event, speeches were delivered by esteemed figures such as Chaphalkar Swami and Gangaram Bhau Mhaskhe, among others. In this meeting Jyotirao Phule proposed the idea of starting the Shiv Jayanti celebration. A total of Rs. 27 was collected from the public for Shiv Jayanti. The main aim of the day is to honour the great warrior's role in restoring the Maratha Empire and to celebrate his vast legacy.

The tradition was later followed by noted freedom fighter Bal Gangadhar Tilak who popularised the image of Shivaji by highlighting his contributions. Tilak helped bring together people during the Independence movement through Shiv Jayanti and stood up against British rule.

Shivaji was born at the Shivneri fort on the third day of the Krishna Paksha of the Phalgun month in the year 1551 of the Shalivahan Shaka. In the Gregorian calendar, the date generally occurs between February and March. As per the Julian calendar, the date is accepted to be February 19, 1630. However, many Hindus celebrate Shiv Jayanti as per the Hindu calendar. The Marathi Shalivahana Hindu calendar birthdate of Shivaji is Falgun Krishna paksha 3, 1551 Julian February 19, 1630, in Shivneri Fort. The error of not converting the Julian date to the corresponding Gregorian one is still not corrected.
