= Gajanan Maharaj Temples =

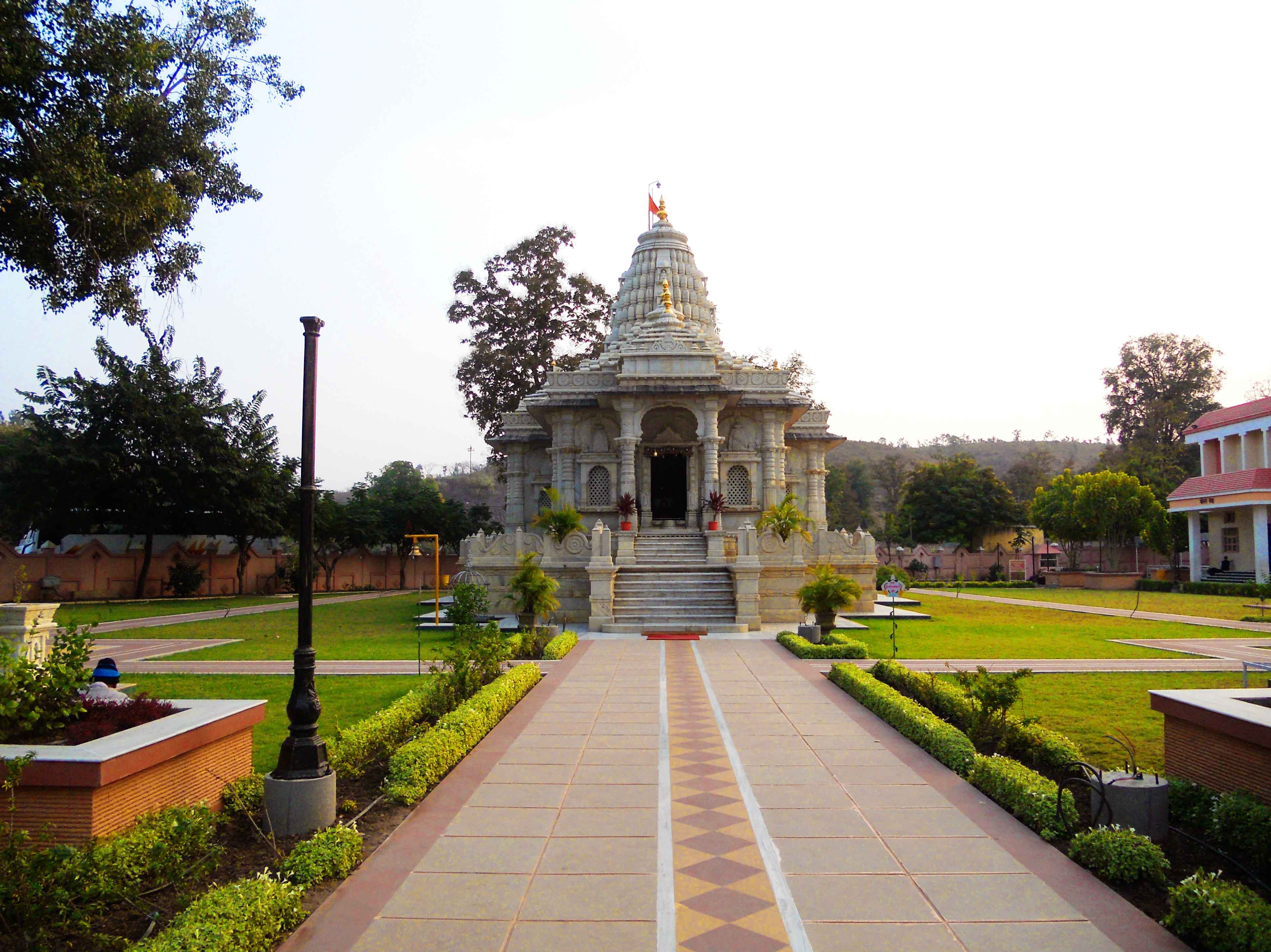
Gajanan Maharaj Temple at Omkareshwar

The Gajanan Maharaj Temples are built to honor Sant Gajanan Maharaj, an Indian holy saint widely popular in Maharashtra, India and also well known in rest of the world. Maharaj lived during the late 19th century and early 20th century, spending most of his life in Shegaon, where he achieved Samadhi on September 8, 1910.

== List of temples across the globe ==
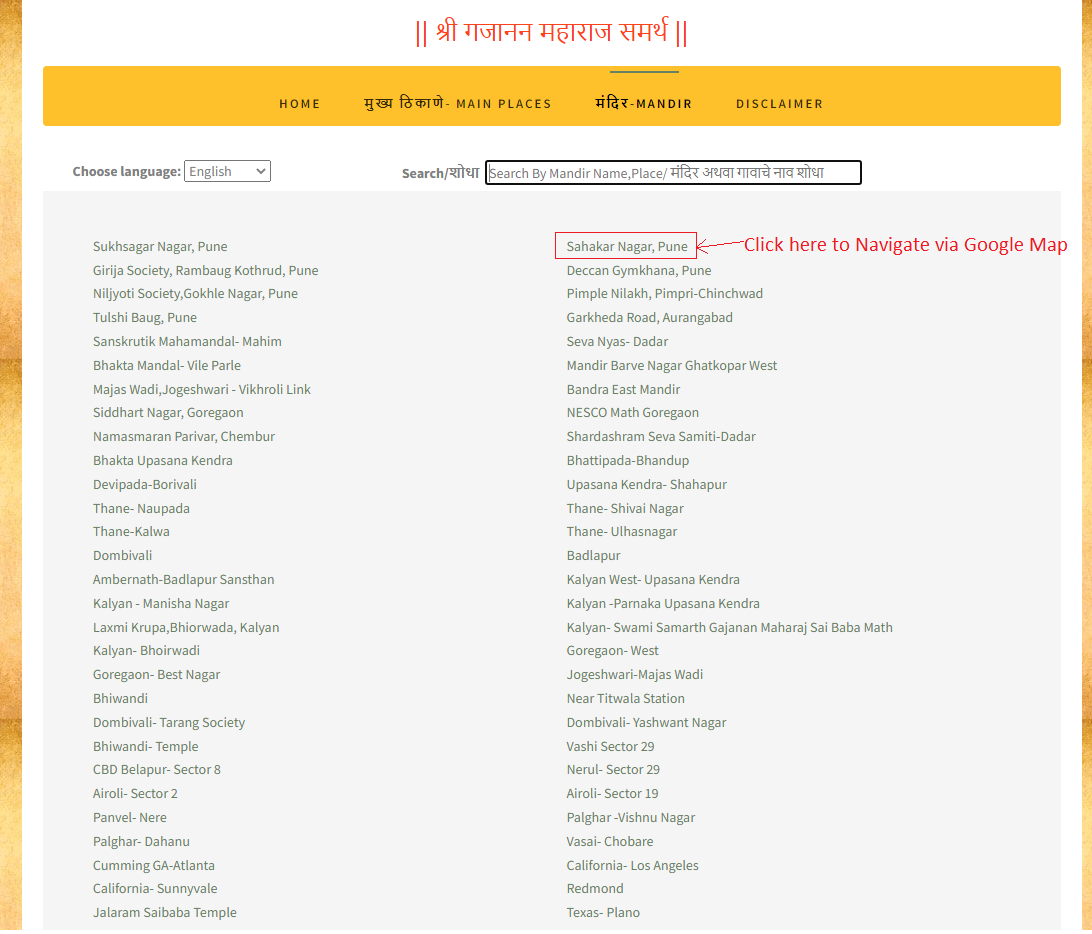
Screen Grab of list of temples of Shree Gajanan Maharaj across the globe

All temples of Shree Gajanan Maharaj are precisely located with the help of Google Maps and can be searched in Devnagari and English script on an external website http://gajanan-maharaj.com/Mandir.html

The screen grab is seen on the right side of the screen

== India ==
=== Shegaon ===
Shegaon gained a reputation as a holy place, after Shri Sant Gajanan Maharaj lived there. Shri Sant Gajanan Maharaj Temple is built at his place of Samadhi. Sant Gajanan Maharaj Sansthan is the largest temple trust in the Vidarbha region and is known as the "Pandharpur of Vidarbha". It attracts pilgrims from all over Maharashtra.

The Gajanan Maharaj Sansthan (Institution) Temple Trust coordinates the day-to-day affairs of the temple; it is headed by the Managing Trustees, who normally come from the Patil family. The Trust coordinates services in the spiritual, religious, medical and educational fields; most notably, it runs Shri Sant Gajanan Maharaj College of Engineering, in the Vidarbha region.

=== Mumbai and surrounding areas ===
Mumbai hosts multiple temples: Bandra East (Government Colony, near Y Quarters), Vile Parle East on Tejpal Scheme Road No. 3, Mahim Kapad Bazar, Goregaon West, Siddharth Nagar, Unnat Nagar, Borivali East, Ghatkopar, D. Y. Patil College in Nerul, Vashi and Dadar West. As of 2011, a new temple is under construction near Manor in Bhopoli.

There are two temples of Gajanan Maharaj in Thane. The first one is at Shivai Nagar, Thane West, Thane, Maharashtra 400606 The second one is at Kalaroksha H.S.C., Ram Maruti Rd, Thane West, Thane, Maharashtra 400602 Shri Vinay Joshi, a devotee of Maharaj, has devoted his own property for the temple. Vinay Joshi sculpted and painted the 2½-foot-tall plaster of Paris statue in "Kalpavruksha", his residence on Ram Maruti Road.

Another temple of Gajanan Maharaj is located at Titwala East in Maanda (which is also known for Maha Ganapati Mandir); it was established by the late Shri Gurunath Mhetre.

Temples are found in Dombivli, Palghar and Dahanu (outside Mumbai). Two temples are located at Parnaka and Manisha Nagar in Kalyan. A small temple is sited at Kanhor, Kulgaon, Badlapur on a hillock. Also a temple is sited at Ambernath near Railway station.

A temple is at Vasai too Chobare gaon, Papdi, Vasai west.

=== Pune ===
Several temples are found in and around Pune, at Tulsi Baug, Sahakar Nagar, on a private property in Wakad, in Old Sangavi, in Kothrud, in Nigdi-Pradhikaran and in Magazine Square, Bhosari.

=== Nagpur ===
The temple of Sant Gajanan Maharaj of Shegaon is organised by Yogiraj Gajanan Seva Pratisthan in Nagpur. Several other temples are dedicated to Gajanan Maharaj, including Reshim Baug (Varhadpande Kaka), Zenda Chowk Dharampeth (the oldest temple, after Shegaon), Lakdi Pool, Naik Road Zenda Chowk Mahal (Prati Shegaon) and Chikhali Layout. The Shree Sant Gajanan Maharaj Mandir Kirnapur at Kirnapur near Hudkeshwar Road, Nagpur.

=== Aurangabad ===
The Shri Sant Gajanan Maharaj Temple was constructed at Aurangabad during 1989–1991.

=== Indore ===
The temple of Sant Gajanan Maharaj of Indore is coordinated by Shri Sadguru Gajanan Maharaj Sevashram in Indore.

=== Other cities ===
Gajanan temples are found at Ratnagiri, Belgaum, Madgaon, Ahmedabad, Khamgaon in Nand Vihar Anikat Road Sutala, the Farshi area, Gajanan colony behind civil hospital Khamgaon, Malkapur, and in Vapi district Balsad of Gujrath.

== United States ==
=== Cumming, Georgia ===
Shri Gajanan Maharaj Murti is at Sri SatyaNarayan Swamy Temple in Cumming (north of Atlanta), Georgia.

=== North Brunswick, New Jersey ===
Shri Gajanan Maharaj murthi sthapna was done in 2021 at Sai Pariwar in North Brunswick, New Jersey

=== Dallas Area, Texas ===
Shri Gajanan Maharaj murthi sthapna was done at Ram Mandir in Plano, Texas

=== Houston, Texas ===
Shri Gajanan Maharaj murthi sthapna was done at Jalaram Saibaba Temple, in Houston, Texas

=== Seattle Area, Washington ===
Shri Gajanan Maharaj murthi sthapna was done at Shri Sai Baba Temple in Redmond, Washington

=== Los Angeles Area, California ===
Shri Gajanan Maharaj Murthi Sthapna was done at Sri Siva Kameswari Temple in Costa Mesa, California

=== Sunnyvale, California ===
Gajanan Maharaj Murti Sthapana was done at Shiv Durga Temple of Sunnyvale, California from 16 February 2017 to 18 February 2017.
