= Shamgarh railway station =

Railway station in Madhya Pradesh, India

Shamgarh

General information
- Location: Shamgarh, Mandsaur district, Madhya Pradesh
- Coordinates: 24°11′30″N 75°38′35″E
- Elevation: 465 metres (1,526 ft)
- System: Indian Railways station
- Owner: Indian Railways
- Operator: West Central Railway
- Line: New Delhi–Mumbai main line
- Platforms: 3
- Tracks: 8

Construction
- Structure type: Standard
- Parking: Yes

Other information
- Status: Functioning
- Station code: SGZ
- Zone(s): West Central Railway
- Division(s): Kota

History
- Opened: 1890
Location
- Location within Madhya Pradesh Location within India

Shamgarh railway station is located in Shamgarh city of Mandsaur district, Madhya Pradesh. Its code is SGZ. It is the largest Railway Station of Mandsaur District. It has three platforms. Passenger, MEMU, Express, and Superfast trains halt here.

== Trains ==
The following trains halt at Shamgarh railway station in both directions:

- Chennai Central–Jaipur Superfast Express
- Coimbatore–Jaipur Superfast Express
- Jaipur–Mysore Superfast Express
- Paschim Express
- Firozpur Janata Express
- Anuvrat AC Superfast Express
- Hapa–Shri Mata Vaishno Devi Katra Sarvodaya Express
- Gandhidham–Shri Mata Vaishno Devi Katra Sarvodaya Express
- Indore–New Delhi Intercity Express
- Jaipur Superfast Express
- Parasnath Express
- Golden Temple Mail
- Dehradun Express
- Ranthambore Express
- Bandra Terminus–Ghazipur City Weekly Express
- Bhagat Ki Kothi–Bilaspur Express
- Bilaspur–Bikaner Express
