= Vikramgarh Alot railway station =

Railway station in Madhya Pradesh

Vikramgarh Alot

General information
- Location: Vikramgarh Alot, Madhya Pradesh; India
- Coordinates: 23°45′53″N 75°32′19″E
- Elevation: 446 metres (1,463 ft)
- System: Indian Railways station
- Owner: Indian Railways
- Operator: West Central Railway
- Line: New Delhi–Mumbai main line
- Platforms: 2
- Tracks: 4 (Double Electrified BG)
- Connections: Auto stand

Construction
- Structure type: Standard (on-ground station)
- Parking: No
- Cycle facilities: No

Other information
- Status: Functioning
- Station code: VMA
- Zone(s): West Central Railway
- Division(s): Kota

Services
Preceding station	Indian Railways	Following station
Thuria towards ?	West Central Railway zone Ramganj Mandi–Nagda section	Luni Richha towards ?
Location
- Location within India Location within Madhya Pradesh

Vikramgarh Alot railway station is a small railway station in Ratlam district, Madhya Pradesh. Its code is VMA. It serves Alot city. The station consists of two platforms.

== Major trains ==
Bandra SVDK express HAPA SVDK express

- Bandra Terminus–Dehradun Express
- Jaipur Superfast Express
- Firozpur Janata Express
- Coimbatore–Jaipur Superfast Express
- Jaipur–Mysore Superfast Express
- Chennai Central–Jaipur Superfast Express
- Ranthambore Express
- Indore–New Delhi Intercity Express
- Puri–Jodhpur Express
- Ratlam–Mathura Passenger
- Phulera–Ratlam Fast Passenger
- Kota–Vadodara Passenger
- Ratlam–Kota Passenger
