= Durgapura railway station =

Railway station in Rajasthan, India

Durgapura
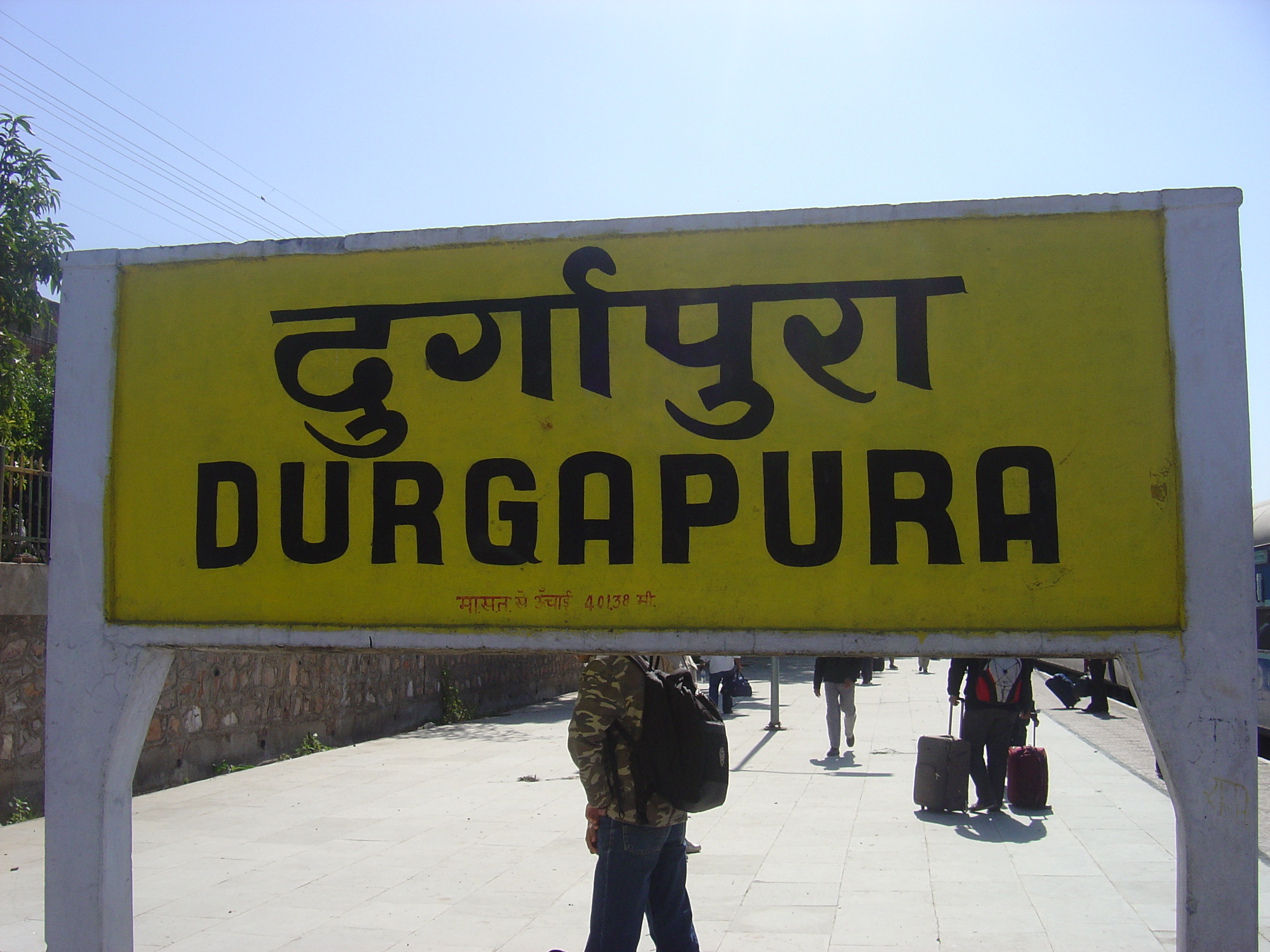

General information
- Location: Jaipur, Rajasthan; India
- Coordinates: 26.8549°N 75.7867°E
- Elevation: 401.380 metres (1,316.86 ft)
- System: Indian Railways station
- Owner: Ministry of Railways, Indian Railways
- Operator: North Western Railways
- Platforms: 2

Construction
- Structure type: Standard (on-ground station)

Other information
- Status: Functioning
- Station code: DPA
- Fare zone: North Western Railways
Location
- Location within Jaipur Location within Rajasthan

Durgapura railway station is a railway station on the North Western Railways network in the state of Rajasthan, India. It is located approximately 8 km from Jaipur railway station.

The station was ranked third in the Swachh Rail, Swachh Bharat 2019 survey about cleanliness of railway stations in India.

== Various trains passing ==
Some of the important trains that pass through Durgapura are :

Train no.	Train name	Train type
59802	FL Kota RTM Passenger	Passenger
12395/12396	Ziyarat Express	Superfast
59805	Passenger	
18243/18244	Bhagat Ki Kothi–Bilaspur Express	Mail Express
18245/18246	Bilaspur–Bikaner Express	Mail Express
12939/12940	Pune–Jaipur Superfast Express	Superfast
12977/12978	Marusagar Express	Superfast
12465/12466	Ranthambore Express	Superfast
12955/12956	Jaipur Superfast Express	Superfast
22933/22934	Bandra Terminus–Jaipur Weekly Superfast Express	Superfast
14813	Jodhpur–Bhopal Express	Mail Express
12181/12182	Dayodaya Express	Superfast
12969/12970	Coimbatore–Jaipur Superfast Express	Superfast
12746	Jodhpur–Puri Express	Superfast
12975/12976	Jaipur–Mysore Superfast Express	Superfast
12967/12968	Chennai Central–Jaipur Superfast Express	Superfast
18573/18574	Visakhapatnam–Bhagat Ki Kothi Express	Mail Express
12979/12980	Jaipur–Bandra Terminus Superfast Express	Superfast
19713	Jaipur–Secunderabad Express	Mail Express
12973/12974	Indore–Jaipur Superfast Express	Superfast
18213/18214	Durg–Jaipur Weekly Express	Mail Express
18207/18208	Durg–Ajmer Express	Mail Express
18631/18632	Ranchi–Ajmer Garib Nawaz Express	Mail Express
16863/16864	Bhagat Ki Kothi–Mannargudi Weekly Express	Mail Express
22632	Bikaner–Chennai Central Weekly Express	Superfast
14709/14710	Bikaner–Puri Express	Mail Express

== See also ==
- Jaipur district
