= Pune–Jaipur Superfast Express =

Overview
- Service type: Superfast Express
- First service: 4 July 2010; 14 years ago
- Current operator(s): North Western Railway

Route
- Termini: Pune Junction (PUNE); Jaipur Junction (JP)
- Stops: 12
- Distance travelled: 1,294 km (804 mi)
- Average journey time: 22 hours 20 minutes
- Service frequency: Two days (Note: Runs two days in a week for every direction.)
- Train number(s): 12939 / 12940

On-board services
- Class(es): AC 2 tier, AC 3 tier, Sleeper Class, General Unreserved
- Seating arrangements: No
- Sleeping arrangements: Yes
- Catering facilities: No
- Observation facilities: Large windows
- Baggage facilities: Below the seats

Technical
- Rolling stock: LHB coach
- Track gauge: 1,676 mm (5 ft 6 in)
- Operating speed: 58 km/h (36 mph) average including halts

The 12939 / 12940 Pune–Jaipur Superfast Express is an intercity train of the Indian Railways connecting Pune in Maharashtra and Jaipur of Rajasthan. It is currently being operated with 12939/12940 train numbers on bi-weekly basis.

== Service ==
The 12939/Pune–Jaipur SF Express has an average speed of 59 km/h and covers 1294 km in 22 hrs 05 mins. 12940/Jaipur–Pune SF Express has an average speed of 57 km/h and covers 1294 km in 22 hrs 50 mins.

== Route and halts ==
The important halts of the train are:

- Pune Junction
- Kalyan Junction
- Vasai Road
- Surat
- Vadodara Junction
- Ratlam Junction
- Ramganj Mandi Junction
- Kota Junction
- Sawai Madhopur Junction
- Banasthali Niwai
- Durgapura
- Jaipur Junction

== Coach composition ==
The train consists of 22 LHB coach :

- 1 AC First-class cum AC II Tier
- 2 AC II Tier
- 3 AC III Tier
- 10 Sleeper coaches
- 4 General
- 2 Second-class Luggage/parcel van

== Traction ==
Both trains are hauled by a Vadodara based WAP-7 electric locomotive from Pune to Jaipur and vice versa.

== Direction reversal ==
The train reverses its direction 1 time:

- Sawai Madhopur Junction
