= Indore–New Delhi Intercity Superfast Express =

Train in India

Overview
- Service type: Intercity Superfast Express
- Locale: Madhya Pradesh, Rajasthan, Uttar Pradesh, Haryana & Delhi
- First service: 1 July 1992; 33 years ago
- Current operator: Northern Railway

Route
- Termini: Indore (INDB); New Delhi (NDLS)
- Stops: 19
- Distance travelled: 826 km (513 mi)
- Average journey time: 12 hours 15 minutes
- Service frequency: Daily
- Train number: 12415 / 12416

On-board services
- Classes: AC First Class, AC 2 Tier, AC 3 Tier, Sleeper Class, General Unreserved
- Seating arrangements: Yes
- Sleeping arrangements: Yes
- Catering facilities: On-board Catering, E-Catering
- Observation facilities: Large windows
- Baggage facilities: Available
- Other facilities: Below the seats

Technical
- Rolling stock: LHB coach
- Track gauge: 1,676 mm (5 ft 6 in)
- Operating speed: 67 km/h (42 mph) average including halts.

The 12415 / 12316 Indore–New Delhi Intercity Superfast Express is a superfast express train service which runs between Indore, the largest city and commercial hub of Central Indian state of Madhya Pradesh and New Delhi, the capital city of India. It is also called as the rajdhani express of Indore by railfans .

This train is the only lengthy train from Indore, having a total of 22 Coaches and is the most preferable choice of the Indore people to reach Delhi. This train is the only ISO Certified train of Indore.

== Coach composition ==
The train consists of 22 LHB coaches:

- 1 AC First Class
- 2 AC II Tier
- 4 AC III Tier
- 2 AC III Tier Economy
- 6 Sleeper Class
- 3 General Unreserved
- 1 End on Generator (EoG)
- 1 Seating Luggage Rake (SLR)

== Service ==
The 12415 Indore–New Delhi Intercity Superfast Express has an average speed of 61 km/h and covers 826 km in 13 hrs 35 mins.

The 12416 New Delhi-Indore Intercity Superfast Express has an average speed of 60 km/h and covers 826 km in 13 hrs 40 mins.

== Route and halts ==
The important halts of the train are :

- Indore Junction
- Dewas Junction
- Ujjain Junction
- Nagda Junction
- Vikramgarh Alot
- Shamgarh
- Bhawani Mandi
- Ramganj Mandi Junction
- Kota Junction
- Sawai Madhopur Junction
- Gangapur City
- Shri Mahabirji
- Bayana Junction
- Bharatpur Junction
- Mathura Junction
- Faridabad
- Hazrat Nizamuddin
- New Delhi

== Schedule ==
| Train Number | Station Code | Departure Station | Departure Time | Departure Day | Arrival Station | Arrival Time | Arrival Day |
|---|---|---|---|---|---|---|---|
| 12415 | INDB | Indore Junction | 16:35 PM | Daily | New Delhi | 06:10 AM | Daily |
| 12416 | NDLS | New Delhi | 22:00 PM | Daily | Indore Junction | 11:40 AM | Daily |

== Direction reversal ==
Train reverses its direction at:

- Nagda Junction

== Traction ==
Both trains are hauled by a Tughlakabad Loco Shed based WAP-7 electric locomotive from end to end.

== See also ==
- Malwa Express
