= Ranthambore Express =

Train in India

Ranthambhore Express

Overview
- Service type: Superfast
- Locale: Rajasthan & Madhya Pradesh
- Current operator: North Western Railway

Route
- Termini: Indore Junction (INDB); Bhagat Ki Kothi (BGKT)
- Stops: 34
- Distance travelled: 914 km (568 mi)
- Average journey time: 16 hrs 20 mins
- Service frequency: Daily
- Train number: 12465 / 12466

On-board services
- Classes: Second Class Seating, AC Chair Car, AC 3 Tier, Sleeper Class, General Unreserved
- Seating arrangements: Yes
- Sleeping arrangements: Yes
- Auto-rack arrangements: Overhead racks
- Catering facilities: On-board catering
- Observation facilities: Large windows
- Baggage facilities: Available
- Other facilities: Below the seats

Technical
- Rolling stock: LHB coach
- Track gauge: 1,676 mm (5 ft 6 in)
- Operating speed: 56 km/h (35 mph) average including halts.
Route map
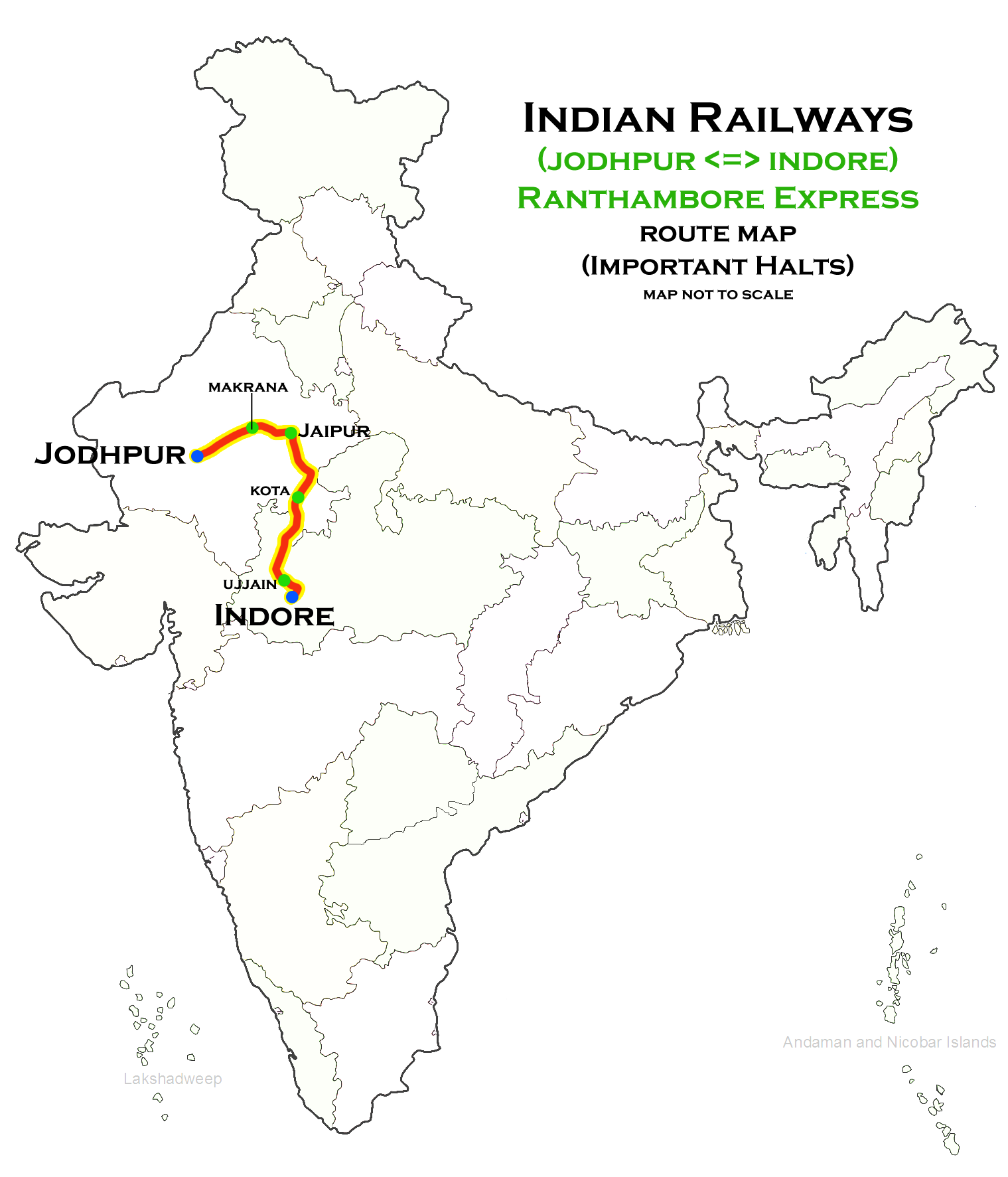

The 12465 / 12466 Ranthambhore Express is a superfast express train service which runs between Indore Junction railway station in Indore, the largest city and the commercial hub of the central Indian state Madhya Pradesh, and Bhagat Ki Kothi railway station, Jodhpur, a major city in Rajasthan, India. It is operated with 12465/12466 train numbers on a daily basis.

== Coach composition ==
The train consists of 17 coaches:

- 1 AC Chair Car
- 3 AC III Tier
- 2 Sleeper coaches
- 3 2nd Seating
- 6 General Unreserved
- 2 End-On Generator

== Service ==
- 12465 Ranthambhore Express has an average speed of 56 km/h and covers 914 km in 16 hrs 20 mins.
- 12466 Ranthambhore Express has an average speed of 56 km/h and covers 914 km in 16 hrs 20 mins.

== Route and halts ==
The important halts of the train are:

- Indore Junction
- Dewas Junction
- Ujjain Junction
- Nagda Junction
- Vikramgarh Alot
- Shamgarh
- Bhawani Mandi
- Ramganj Mandi Junction
- Kota Junction
- Sawai Madhopur Junction
- Durgapura
- Jaipur Junction
- Phulera Junction
- Sambhar Lake Town
- Nawa City
- Kuchaman City
- Makrana Junction
- Degana Junction
- Merta Road Junction
- Gotan
- Raikabag Palace Junction
- Jodhpur Junction
- Bhagat Ki Kothi.

== Schedule ==
Train number	Station code	Departure station	Departure time	Departure day	Arrival station	Arrival time	Arrival day
12465	INDB	Indore Junction	06:00 AM	Daily	Bhagat Ki Kothi	22:35 PM	Daily
12466	BGKT	Bhagat Ki Kothi	05:00 AM	Daily	Indore Junction	22:25 PM	Daily

== Rake sharing ==
The train shares its rake with 14801/14802 Jodhpur–Indore Express.

== Direction reversals ==
The train reverses its direction twice at:

- Nagda Junction
- Sawai Madhopur Junction.

== Traction ==
Both trains are hauled by a Bhagat Ki Kothi Loco Shed or Vadodara Loco Shed-based WAP-7 electric locomotive from Indore to Bhagat Ki Kothi and vice versa.

== See also ==
- Jodhpur–Indore Express
- Indore–Jaipur Superfast Express
- Indore–Ajmer Link Express
- Bhopal–Jodhpur Passenger
