= Jaipur–Bandra Terminus Superfast Express =

Train in India

Overview
- Service type: Superfast Express
- Locale: Rajasthan, Madhya Pradesh, Gujarat & Maharashtra
- Current operator: North Western Railway

Route
- Termini: Jaipur Junction (JP); Bandra Terminus (BDTS)
- Stops: 17
- Distance travelled: 1,148 km (713 mi)
- Average journey time: 16 hours 42 minutes
- Service frequency: Tri-weekly
- Train number: 12979 / 12980

On-board services
- Classes: AC First Class, AC 2 Tier, AC 3 Tier, AC 3 Tier Economy, Sleeper Class, General Unreserved
- Seating arrangements: Yes
- Sleeping arrangements: Yes
- Catering facilities: On-board catering, E-catering
- Observation facilities: Large windows
- Baggage facilities: No
- Other facilities: Below the seats

Technical
- Rolling stock: LHB coach
- Track gauge: 1,676 mm (5 ft 6 in)
- Operating speed: 130 km/h (81 mph) maximum, 70 km/h (43 mph) average including halts.

The 12979 / 12980 Jaipur–Bandra Terminus Superfast Express is a Superfast train belonging to Indian Railways that runs between Jaipur Junction and Bandra Terminus in India.

It operates as train number 12980 from Jaipur Junction to Bandra Terminus and as train number 12979 in the reverse direction. It runs on every Monday, Wednesday and Friday from Jaipur Junction and on every Tuesday, Thursday and Saturday from Bandra Terminus.

== Coaches ==
The train has LHB coaches that run at maximum speed of 130 kmph. The train consists of 22 coaches:

- 1 AC I cum AC II Tier
- 2 AC II Tier
- 6 AC III Tier
- 7 Sleeper coaches
- 4 General Unreserved
- 2 Generator cum Luggage Rake

As with most train services in India, coach composition may be amended at the discretion of Indian Railways depending on demand.

== Service ==
12980 Jaipur–Bandra Terminus Superfast Express covers the distance of 1148 kilometres in 16 hours 45 mins (70 km/h) & in 16 hours 40 mins (70 km/h) as 12979 Bandra Terminus–Jaipur Superfast Express.

As the average speed of the train is above 55 km/h, as per Indian Railways rules, its fare includes a Superfast surcharge.

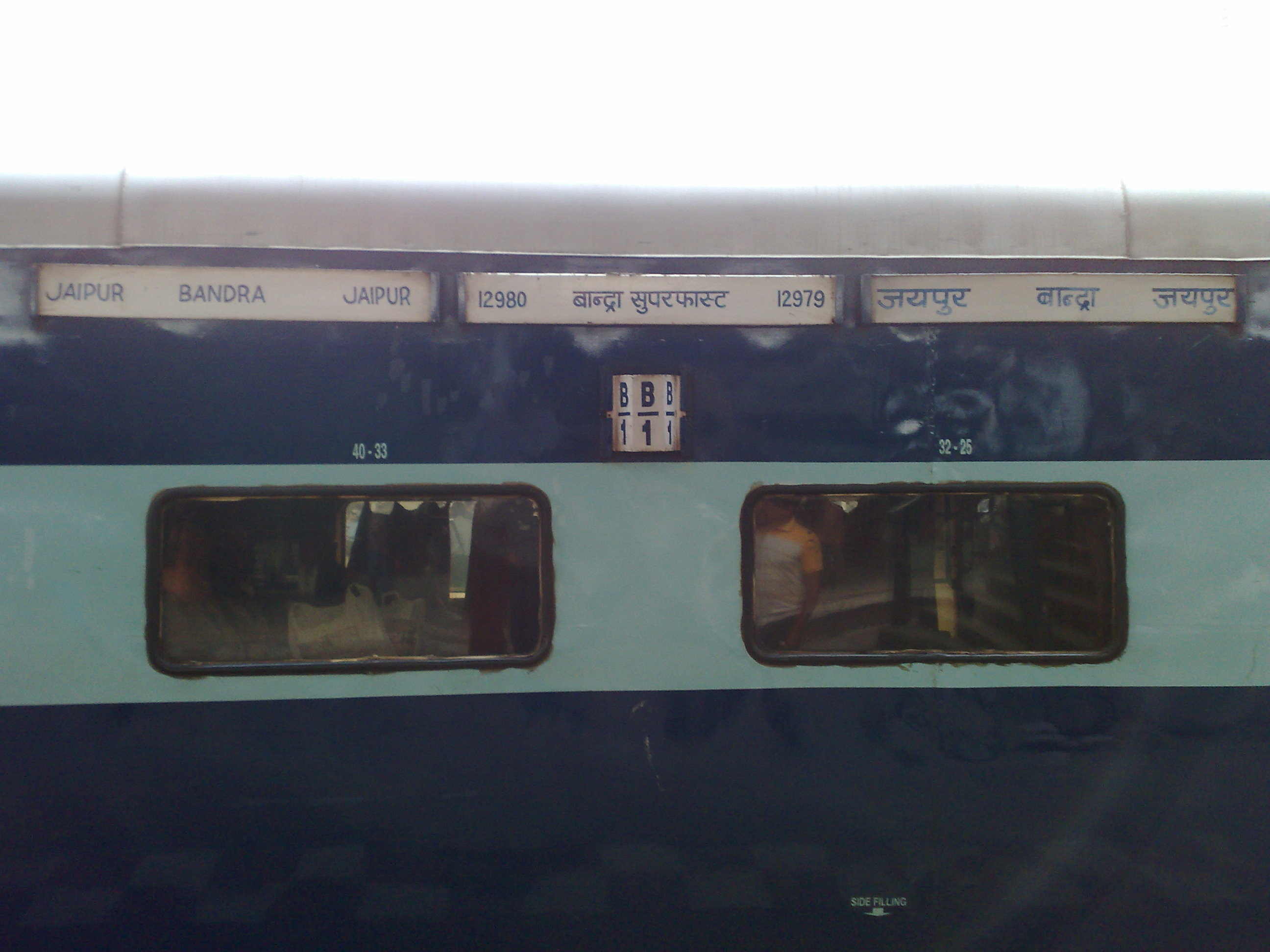
Bandra Terminus Jaipur Superfast Express – AC 3 tier coach

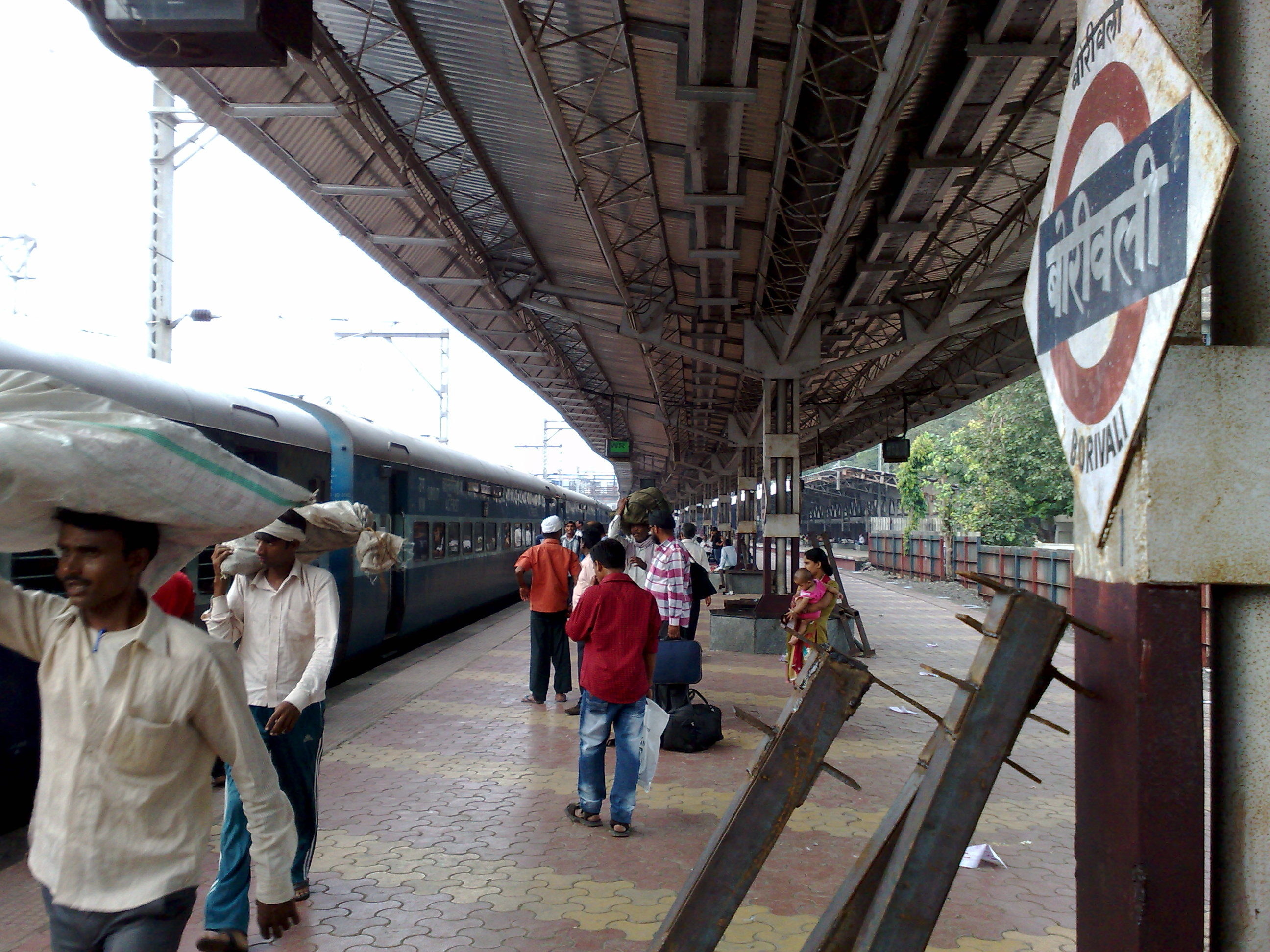
Bandra Terminus Jaipur Superfast Express at Borivali station

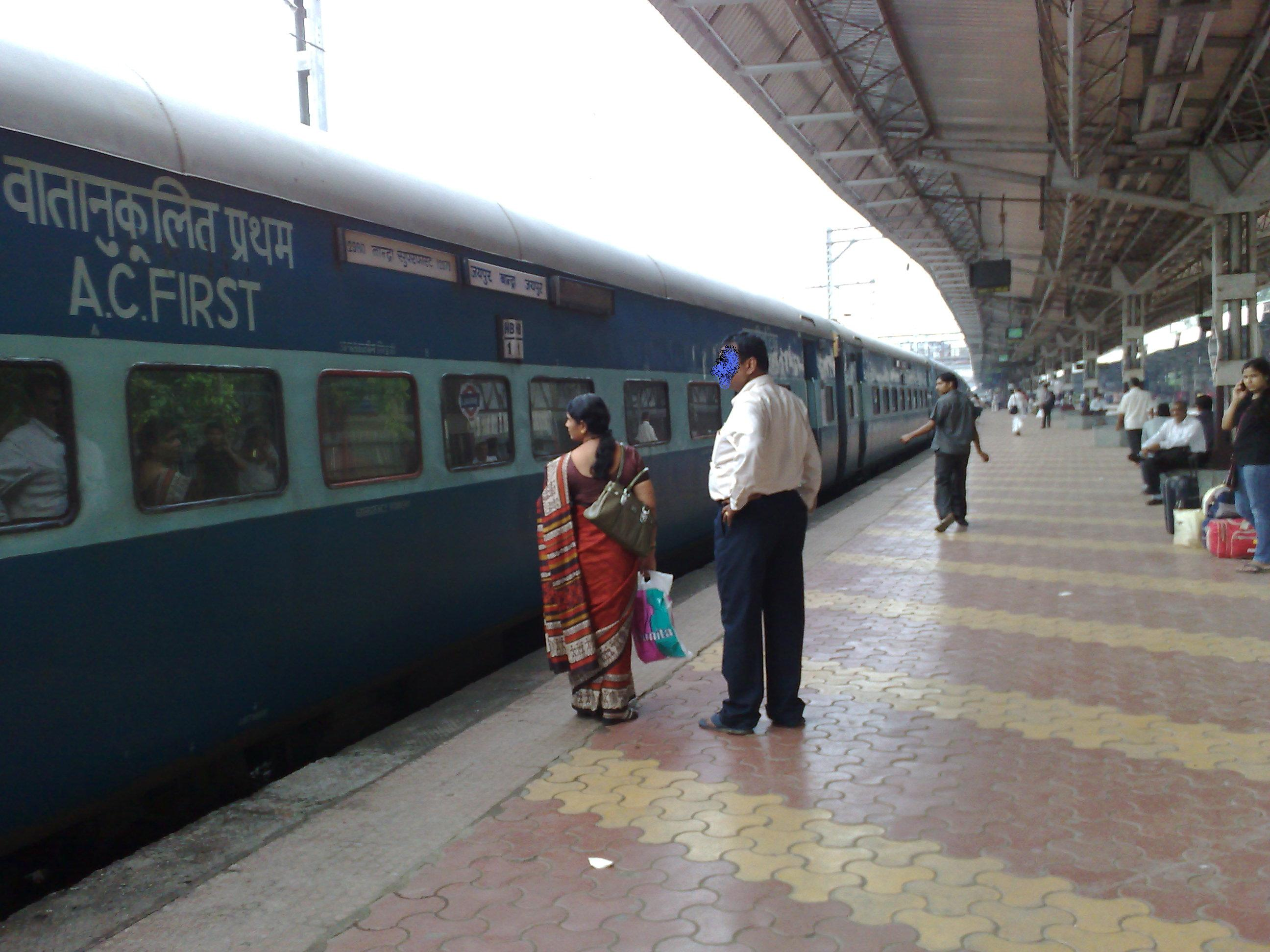
Bandra Terminus Jaipur Superfast Express – AC 1st Class coach

== Route and halts ==
The important halts of the train are:

- Jaipur Junction
- Durgapura
- Sawai Madhopur Junction
- Kota Junction
- Nagda Junction
- Ratlam Junction
- Meghnagar
- Dahod
- Godhra Junction
- Vadodara Junction
- Surat
- Navsari
- Valsad
- Vapi
- Palghar
- Borivali
- Andheri
- Bandra Terminus

== Schedule ==
Train number	Station code	Departure station	Departure time	Departure day	Arrival station	Arrival time	Frequency
12980	JP	Jaipur Junction	20:25 PM	Mon, Wed, Fri	Bandra Terminus	13:10 PM	Tue, Thu, Sat
12979	BDTS	Bandra Terminus	17:05 PM	Tue, Thu, Sat	Jaipur Junction	09:45 AM	Sun, Wed, Fri

== Direction reversal ==
The train reverses direction one time at Sawai Madhopur Junction.

== Traction ==
An Abu Road-based WDM-3A or Bhagat Ki Kothi-based WDP-4 hauls the train between Jaipur Junction and Sawai Madhopur Junction.

Prior to Western Railways switching to AC traction, it would get a Vadodara-based WAP-4E or locomotive until Valsad after which a WCAM-1 would take over until Bandra Terminus.

Western Railways completed DC electric conversion to AC on 5 February 2012 & it is now regularly hauled by a Vadodara-based WAP-5 or WAP-7 locomotive from Jaipur Junction until Bandra Terminus.
