= Marusagar Express =

Train in India

The Marusagar Express is a weekly express train that runs between Ajmer and Ernakulam, connecting Rajasthan, Madhya Pradesh, Gujarat, Maharashtra, Goa, Karnataka to Kerala. The train runs through four zones of Indian Railways, travelling 2860 km in around 48 hours. There are 32 halts along the way. It starts from Ajmer on Friday morning and reaches Ernakulam Junction on Sunday early morning, and starts back to Ajmer on Sunday evening to reach Ajmer on Tuesday afternoon.

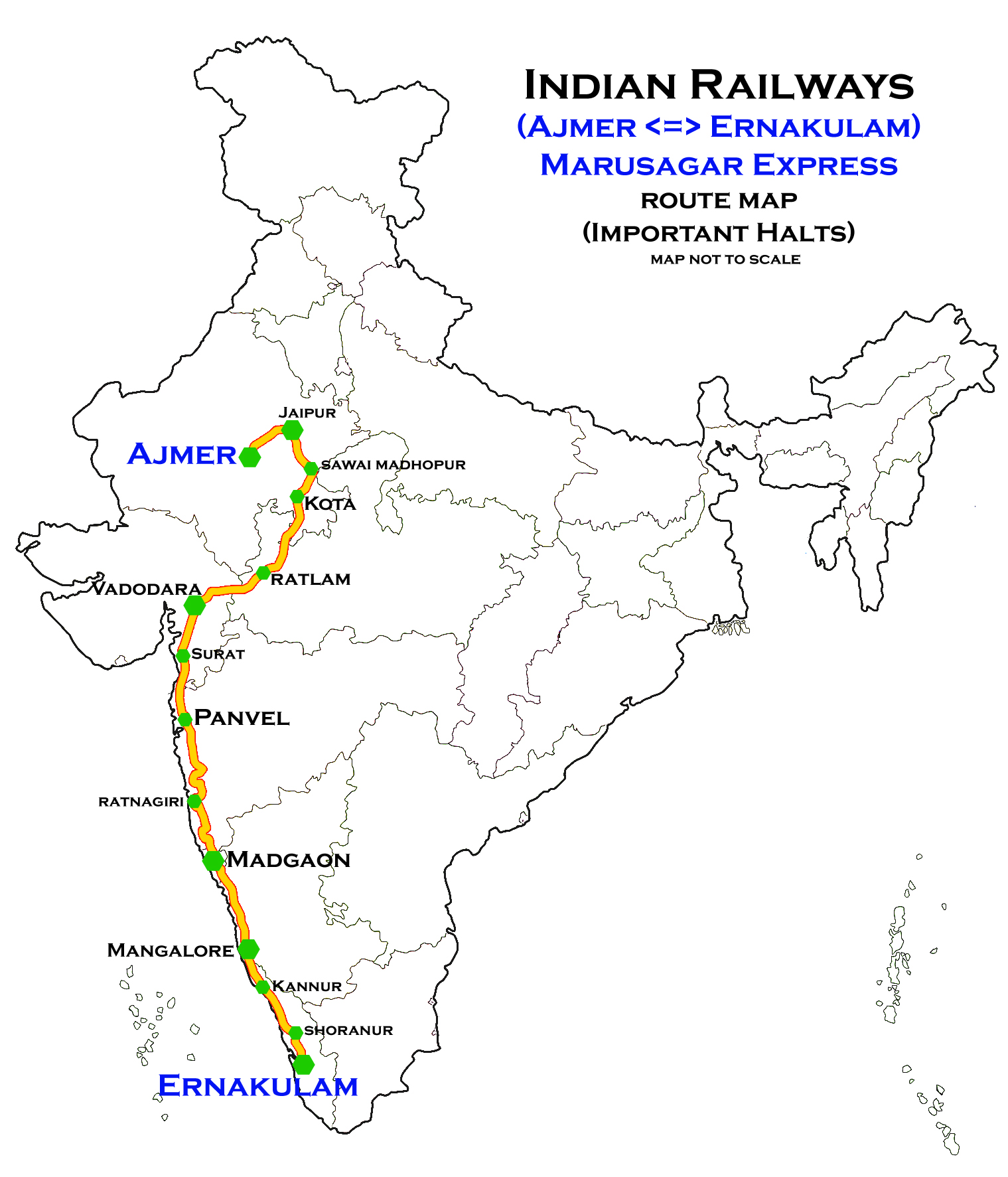
Marusagar Express (Ajmer–Ernakulam) route map

== History ==
The service of this train was proposed in year 1999 rail budget from Indore Junction railway station of Indore, Madhya Pradesh as Indore–Mangalore Weekly Express but due to non-availability of the rake and traction and delay in the service at Mangalore, the erstwhile Indore–Chennai Ahilyanagari Express got extended to Cochin & Trivandrum Central via Ernakulam. A weekly train was also started from Indore Junction to Kochuveli via Mangalore. Later after several demands the train was started on 4 September 2002 from Ratlam Junction, Madhya Pradesh to Mangalore Junction as 'Ratlam–Mangalore Superfast Express' with 10 AC coaches, 10 Sleeper, 2 General and 2 SLR coaches. Since, Ratlam was an intermediate station for Jaipur and Vadodara respectively and to avoid the changes made in the route of Ratlam–Mangalore Express, Later in year 2003 it got extended to Jaipur on one side and to Ernakulam on other side. From 2009 September onwards, the service of this train was extended up to Ajmer Junction. It is the fourth fastest train of North Western Railways after 12973/12974 Indore–Jaipur Express, 12181/12182 Jaipur–Jabalpur Super Fast Express & 12465/12466 Jodhpur–Indore Intercity Express. This train is in the "Superfast" category, and so has more importance than normal passenger and express train.

== Origin of name ==
The word "MaruSagar" essentially means "Desert-Ocean". The word "Maru" refers to the Thar Desert in Rajasthan and the word "Sagar" refers to the ocean (the Arabian Sea). Thus, the train connects the desert state of Rajasthan to the Arabian Sea coast in the West. It travels from Ajmer in Rajasthan to Kochi, in Kerala, passing through the towns of Jaipur, Sawai Madhopur, Kota, Nagda, Ratlam Junction, Vadodara, Panvel, Raigad, Ratnagiri, Goa, Mangalore, Kasaragod, Kannur, Kozhikode, Tirur, Shoranur Junction and Thrissur on the way. After Vadodara, the train travels along the western coast of India beside the Arabian Sea.

== Train details ==
- 12978 DN Ajmer -> Ernakulam (Friday)
- 12977 UP Ernakulam -> Ajmer (Sunday)

== Train composition ==
LOCO-SLR-GS-GS-S1-S2-S3-S4-S5-S6-S7-S8-S9-S10-PC-B5-B4-B3-B2-B1-A1-HB1-GS-GS-SLR;

== Loco link ==
earlier was WDP-4. The train runs hauls by A Erode Wap 7 & Ghaziabad Wap 5 on its entire journey.

== See also ==
- Konkan Railway
