= Indore–Jaipur Superfast Express =

Train in India

Overview
- Service type: Superfast
- Locale: Madhya Pradesh, & Rajasthan
- First service: 5 August 1997; 28 years ago
- Current operator: North Western Railways

Route
- Termini: Indore Junction (INDB); Jaipur Junction (JP)
- Stops: 7
- Distance travelled: 600 km (373 mi)
- Average journey time: 9 hours 55 minutes
- Service frequency: Bi-weekly
- Train number: 12973 / 12974

On-board services
- Classes: AC First Class, AC II Tier, AC III Tier, General Unreserved
- Seating arrangements: Yes
- Sleeping arrangements: No
- Auto-rack arrangements: Available
- Catering facilities: Available
- Observation facilities: Large windows
- Baggage facilities: Available

Technical
- Rolling stock: LHB coach
- Track gauge: 1,676 mm (5 ft 6 in)
- Operating speed: 60 km/h (37 mph) average with halts

The 12973 / 12974 Indore–Jaipur Superfast Express is a Superfast train which runs between Indore Junction and Jaipur Junction. It is currently being operated with 12973/12974 train numbers on bi-weekly basis.

== Coach composition ==
The train consists of 21 coaches:

- 1 AC First Class
- 2 AC II Tier
- 4 AC III Tier
- 8 Sleeper Class
- 4 General Unreserved
- 2 End On Generator

== Service ==
12973/Indore–Jaipur Superfast Express has an average speed of 61 km/h and covers 600 km in 9 hrs 55 mins.

12974/Jaipur–Indore Superfast Express has an average speed of 60 km/h and covers 600 km in 10 hrs 05 mins.

== Route and halts ==
The important halts of the train are :

- Indore Junction
- Dewas Junction
- Ujjain Junction
- Nagda Junction
- Ramganj Mandi Junction
- Kota Junction
- Sawai Madhopur Junction
- Durgapura
- Jaipur Junction

== Schedule ==
Train number	Station code	Departure station	Departure time	Departure day	Arrival station	Arrival time	Arrival day
12973	INDB	Indore Junction	22:25 PM	Mon, Sat	Jaipur Junction	08:20 AM	Sun, Tue
12974	JP	Jaipur Junction	21:05 PM	Sun, Fri	Indore Junction	07:10 AM	Mon, Sat

== Traction ==
Both trains are hauled by a Vadodara Locomotive Shed-based WAP-5 or WAP-4E electric locomotive between Indore Junction and Sawai Madhopur Junction. After Sawai Madhopur Junction, both trains are hauled by a Bhagat Ki Kothi Diesel Loco Shed-based WDP-4D or WDP-4B or WDP-4 up to Jaipur Junction and vice versa.
