= Jaipur–Mysore Superfast Express =

Train in India

Jaipur–Mysuru Superfast Express
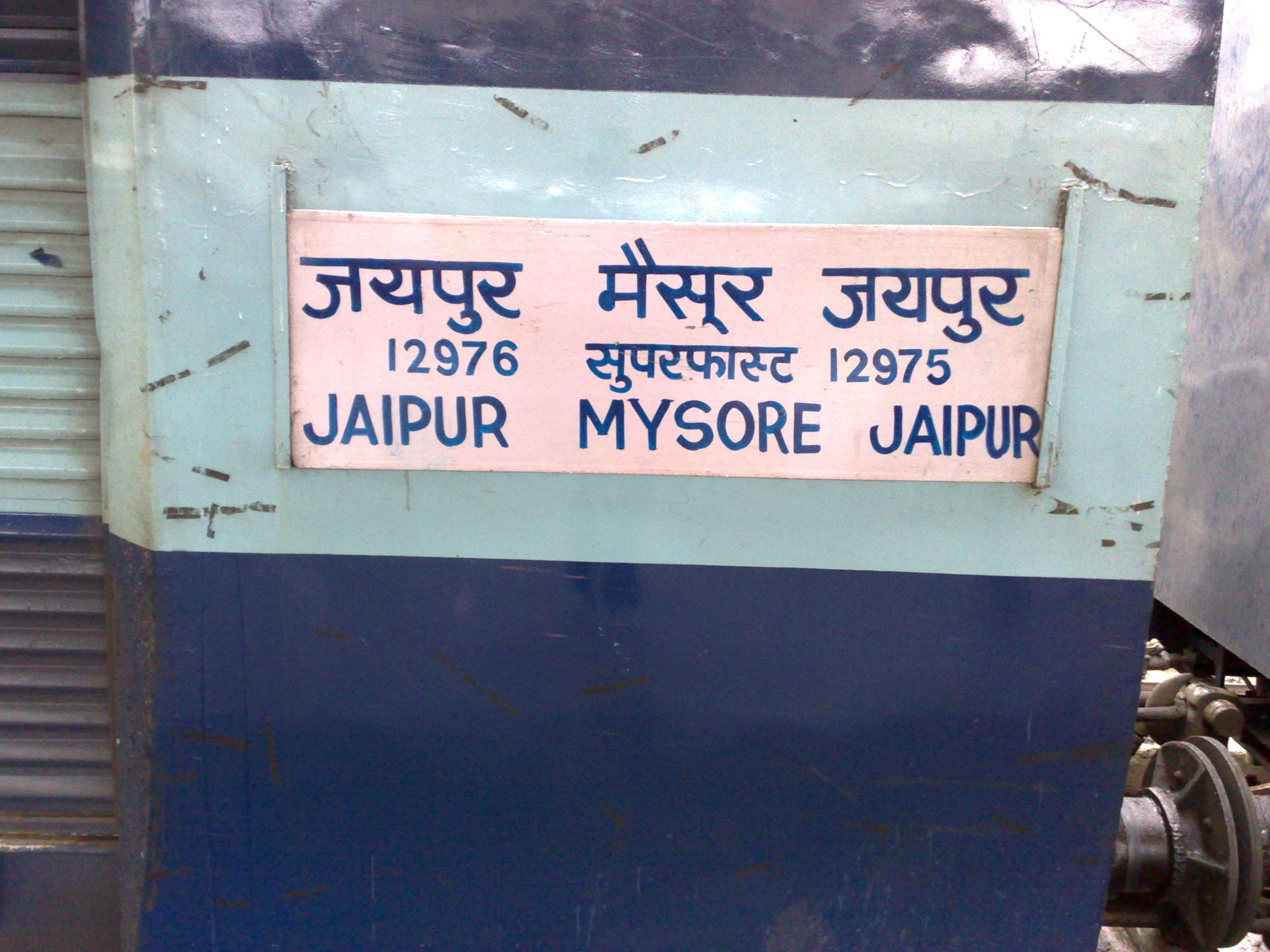

Overview
- Service type: Superfast Express
- Locale: Rajasthan, Madhya Pradesh, Maharashtra, Telangana, Andhra Pradesh & Karnataka
- First service: 2 September 2000; 25 years ago
- Current operator: North Western Railways

Route
- Termini: Jaipur (JP); Mysuru Junction (MYS)
- Stops: 40
- Distance travelled: 2,479 km (1,540 mi)
- Average journey time: 44 hours 00 minutes
- Service frequency: Bi-weekly
- Train number: 12975 / 12976

On-board services
- Classes: AC 1st Class, AC 2 tier, AC 3 tier, Sleeper class, General Unreserved
- Seating arrangements: Yes
- Sleeping arrangements: Yes
- Catering facilities: Available
- Observation facilities: Rake sharing with 19713/19714 Jaipur–Secunderabad Express
- Baggage facilities: Available

Technical
- Rolling stock: LHB coach
- Track gauge: 1,676 mm (5 ft 6 in)
- Operating speed: 110 km/h (68 mph) maximum 56 km/h (35 mph) average including halts
Route map
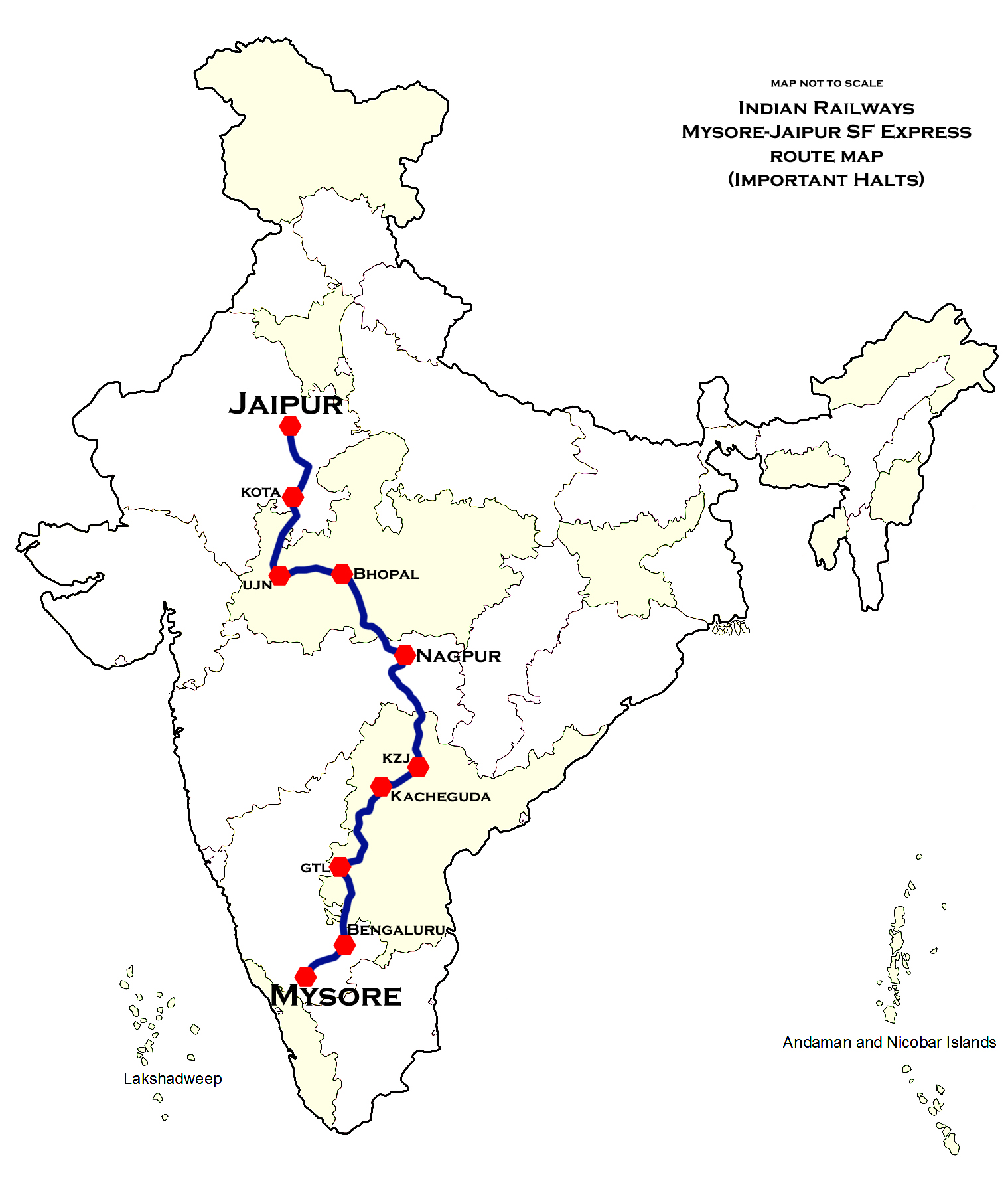

The 12975 / 12976 Jaipur–Mysuru Superfast Express is Superfast Express train belonging to Indian Railways that runs between Jaipur Junction and Mysuru Junction in India.

It operates as train number 12976 from Jaipur Junction to Mysore Junction and as train number 12975 in the reverse direction. Has pantry car in both directions, but with only vegetarian menu. No non veg is served. Not even egg.

== Coaches ==
12975/12976 Jaipur–Mysore Superfast Express presently has 1 AC 1st Class cum AC 2 tier, 2 AC 2 tier, 5 AC 3 tier, 11 Sleeper class, 4 General Unreserved coaches & 1 Pantry Car coach.

As with most train services in India, coach composition may be amended at the discretion of Indian Railways depending on demand.

== Service ==
12976 Jaipur–Mysuru Superfast Express covers the distance of 2479 kilometres in 44 hours 00 mins (56.34 km/h) and in 44 hours 55 mins (55.19 km/h) as 12975 Mysuru–Jaipur Superfast Express.

As the average speed of the train is above 55 km/h, as per Indian Railways rules, its fare includes a Superfast surcharge.

== Direction reversal ==
The train reverses its direction 3 times during its journey at;

- Sawai Madhopur Junction
- Nagda Junction
- Guntakal Junction.

== Routing ==
The train runs from Jaipur Junction via Durgapura, Sawai Madhopur, Kota Junction, Nagda, Ujjain Junction, Bhopal Junction, Itarsi Junction, Nagpur, Sewagram, Balharshah, Kazipet, Kacheguda, Kurnool City, Dhone, Guntakal, Dharmavaram, KSR Bengaluru

to

Mysuru Junction .

== Rake sharing ==
The train shares its rake with 19713/19714 Jaipur–Secunderabad Express.

== Gallery ==
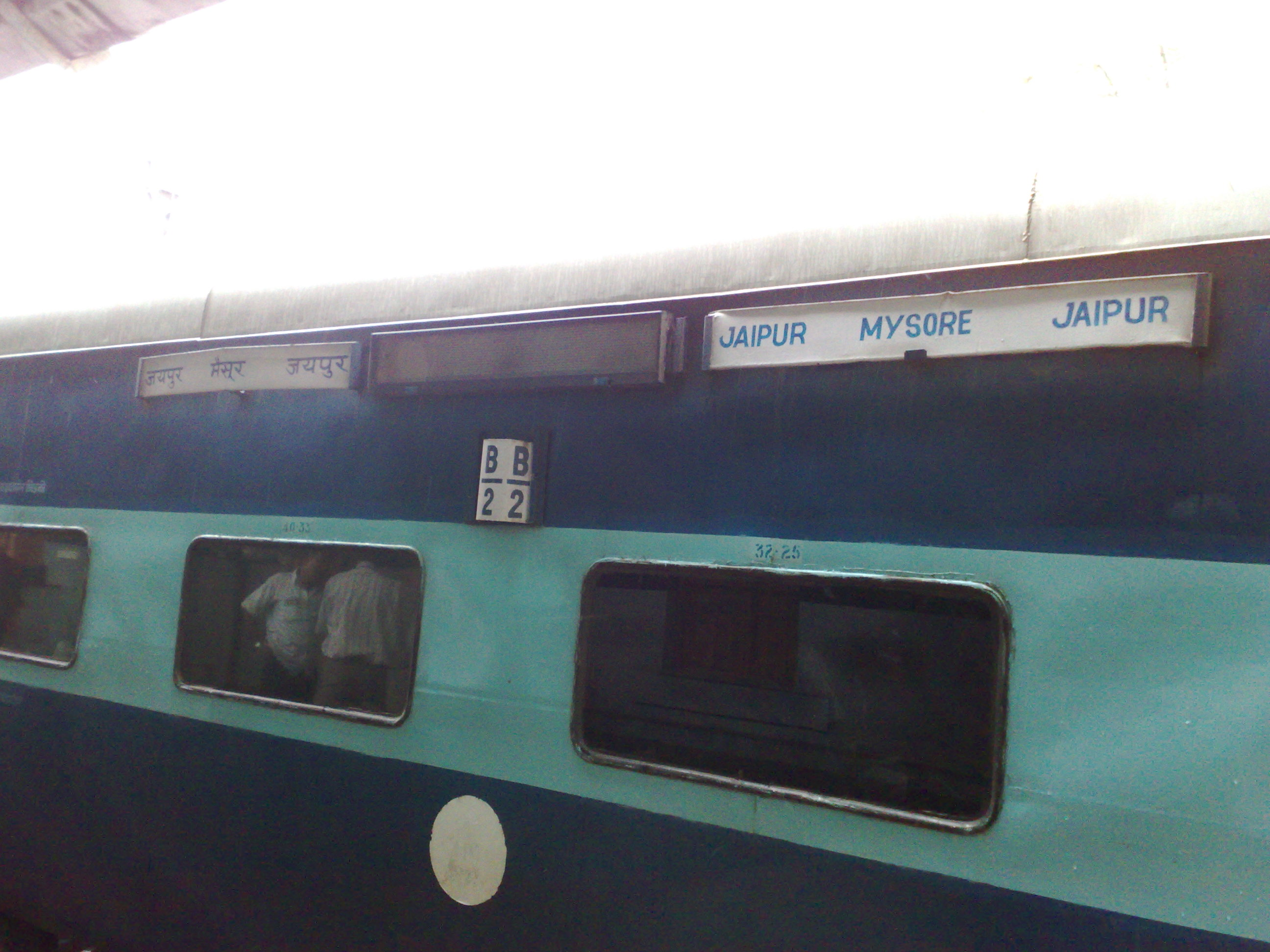
12976 Jaipur Mysore Express – AC 3 tier coach

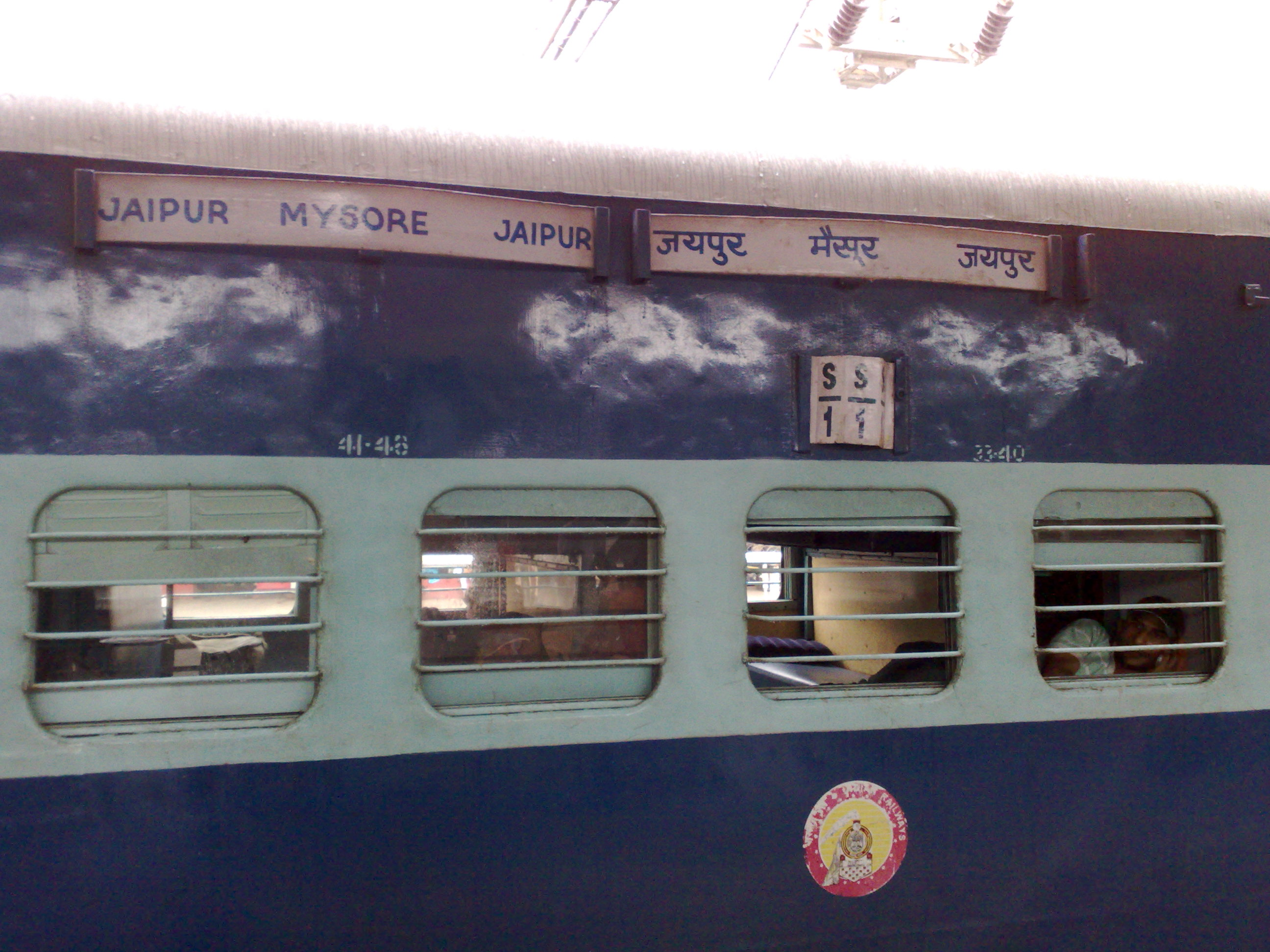
12976 Jaipur Mysore Express – Sleeper coach

== Traction ==
It is hauled by Lallaguda-based WAP-7 from Jaipur to Mysuru Junction and vice-versa .

== Time table ==
- 12976 Jaipur–Mysore Superfast Express leaves Jaipur Junction every Monday & Wednesday at 19:35 hrs IST and reaches Mysore Junction at 16:20 hrs IST on the 3rd day.
- 12975 Mysore–Jaipur Superfast Express leaves Mysore Junction every Thursday & Saturday at 10:15 hrs IST and reaches Jaipur Junction at 06:15 hrs IST on the 3rd day.
