= Shamgarh =

- Location in Madhya Pradesh, India Shamgarh (India)
- Coordinates: 24.18°N 75.63°E
- Country: India
- State: Madhya Pradesh
- District: Mandsaur
- Founder: Rao Pratap Singh Panwar Bijoliya

Government
  - Type: republic
- Elevation: 459 m (1,506 ft)

Population (2011)
  - Total: 24,637
- Time zone: UTC+5:30 (IST)

Shamgarh is a City and a nagar parishad in Mandsaur district in the Indian state of Madhya Pradesh. Shamgarh is located at 24.18°N 75.63°E.

== Demographics ==
As of 2001 India census, Shamgarh had a population of 21,455. Males constitute 52% of the population and females 48%. Shamgarh has an average literacy rate of 69%, higher than the national average of 59.5%: male literacy is 79%, and female literacy is 59%. In Shamgarh, 15% of the population is under 6 years of age.
