= Mumbai Central–Jaipur Superfast Express =

Train in India

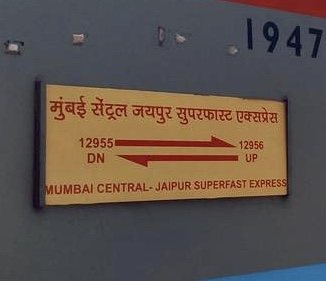

Overview
- Service type: Superfast Express
- Status: Running
- Locale: Maharashtra, Gujarat, Madhya Pradesh & Rajasthan
- First service: 30 January 1993; 33 years ago
- Current operator: Western Railways
- Ridership: Daily

Route
- Termini: Mumbai Central (MMCT); Jaipur (JP)
- Stops: 19
- Distance travelled: 1,162 km (722 mi)
- Average journey time: 16 hours 55 minutes
- Service frequency: Daily
- Train number: 12955 / 12956

On-board services
- Classes: AC 1st Class, AC 2 Tier, AC 3 Tier, Sleeper class, General unreserved
- Seating arrangements: Yes
- Sleeping arrangements: Yes
- Auto-rack arrangements: Upper
- Catering facilities: Available
- Observation facilities: Large windows
- Baggage facilities: Overhead

Technical
- Rolling stock: LHB coach
- Track gauge: 1,676 mm (5 ft 6 in)
- Electrification: Fully Electrified
- Operating speed: 130 km/h (81 mph) maximum, 70 km/h (43 mph) average with halts
Route map
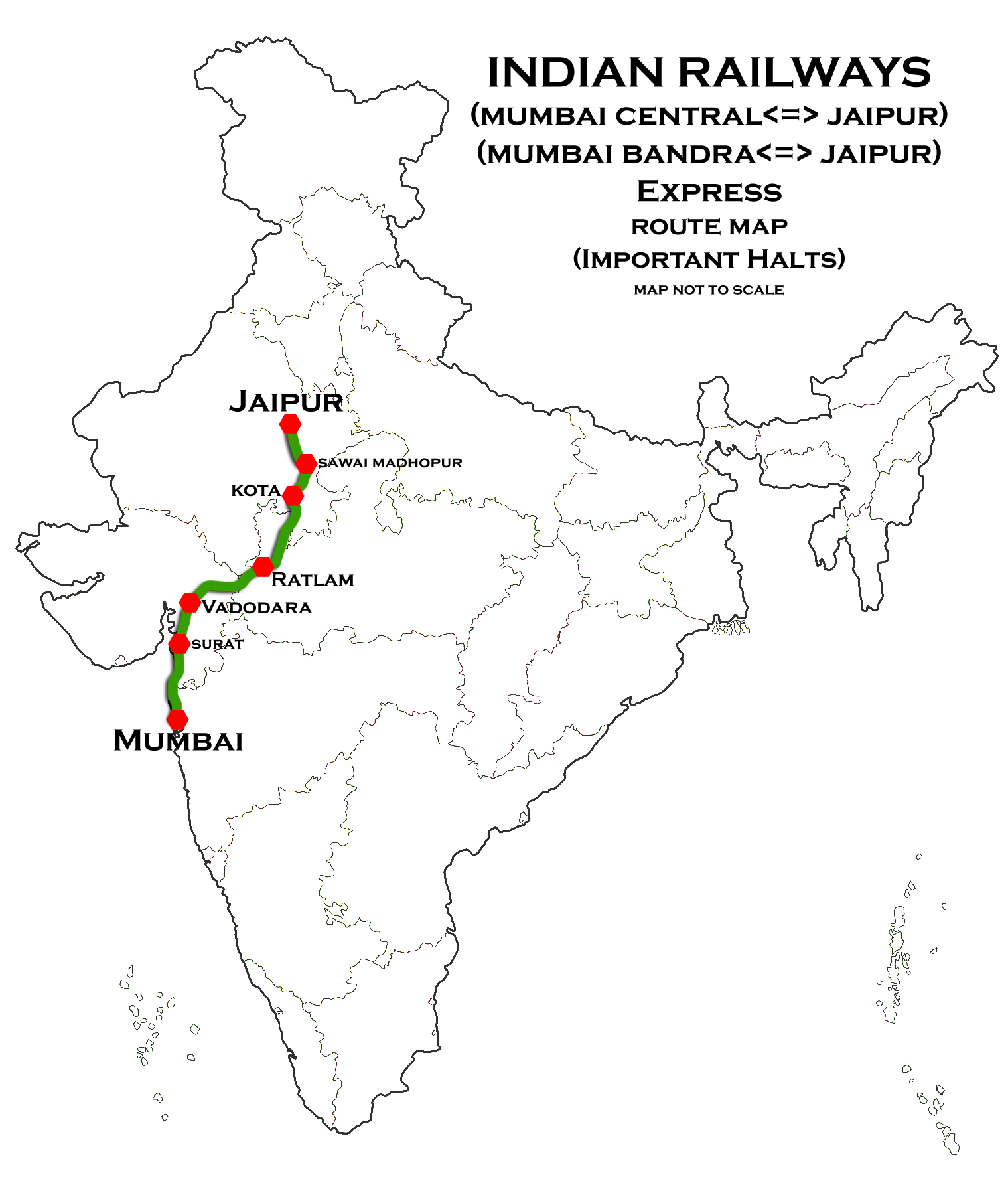

Mumbai Central Superfast Express (Trains 12955/12956) is a daily superfast express train. It is one of the most important trains of India’s Western Railway running between Mumbai in Maharashtra and Jaipur in Rajasthan, India. It was the first direct train between these two cities. It is the fastest train under Superfast category of trains; which is running between Mumbai and Jaipur.

== Overview ==
This train is the first broad-gauge train from Jaipur Junction and it came into service on 30 January 1993. Jaipur Superfast is also informally known as Gangaur Express. Before Jaipur Junction was upgraded to broad-gauge, this train ran between Mumbai Central and Durgapura station, another railway station in Jaipur.

It operates as train number 12955 in the northbound direction from Mumbai Central to Jaipur Junction and in the southbound direction as train number 12956 between Jaipur Junction and Mumbai Central. It covers a distance of 1,162 kilometres (722 mi) in 16 hours and 55 minutes with an average speed of 70 km/h (43 mph) (with halts) in the both directions, with a maximum speed of 130 km/h (81 mph). The train is equipped with Bio toilets. A scheme of meal coupons was first experimented on this train.

== Important halts ==
The train halts at important stations such as Borivali, Surat, Vadodara, Ratlam, Kota, Sawai Madhopur and Durgapura in the down and up directions.

== Schedule ==
It leaves Mumbai Central at 19:05, and arrives at Jaipur the next day at 12:00.

Station Code	Station Name	Arrival	Departure
MMCT	Mumbai Central	---	19:05
BVI	Borivali	19:40	19:42
ST	Surat	22:30	22:35
BRC	Vadodara Junction	00:08	00:18
RTM	Ratlam Junction	04:05	04:10
KOTA	Kota Junction	07:45	07:55
SWN	Sawai Madhopur Junction	09:25	09:45
DPA	Durgapura	11:27	11:30
JP	Jaipur Junction	12:00	---

After stopping in Jaipur, it starts its return to Mumbai Central at 14:00, and arrives the next day at 06:55.

Station Code	Station Name	Arrival	Departure
JP	Jaipur Junction	---	14:00
DPA	Durgapura	14:08	14:11
SWM	Sawai Madhopur Junction	15:50	16:05
KOTA	Kota Junction	17:10	17:20
RTM	Ratlam Junction	21:10	21:20
BRC	Vadodara Junction	00:56	01:06
ST	Surat	02:48	02:53
BVI	Borivali	05:56	06:00
MMCT	Mumbai Central	06:55	---

== Coach composition ==
The train is running with LHB coach effectively from 1 November 2019. The train has total 22 coaches with 1 end-on-generator car, 1 coach of First AC, 3 coaches of Second AC Coach, 6 coaches of Third AC, 6 coaches of Second Sleeper, 3 unreserved coaches, 1 Pantry Car and 1 High Capacity Parcel Van both down and up services.

Loco	1	2	3	4	5	6	7	8	9	10	11	12	13	14	15	16	17	18	19	20	21	22
	EOG	D1	S1	S2	S3	S4	S5	S6	PC	B1	B2	B3	B4	B5	B6	A1	A2	A3	H1	D2	DL1	HCVP

== Traction ==
Prior to DC to AC Conversion of Western Line Suburban Railway in Mumbai; it departed from Mumbai Central with a Valsad Loco Shed WCAM 2/2P locomotive in order to use Mumbai's DC traction wires. There was a locomotive change at Vadodara where it used to swap the WCAM 2/2P for a Vadodara Loco Shed WAP 4E .

At Sawai Madhopur Junction it got a WDP 4/4B/4D from Bhagat Ki Kothi shed for its remaining journey upto Jaipur. Sawai Madhopur Junction is also where it gets a reversal in direction.

The Western railway completed DC to AC electric conversion on 5 February 2012. After the complete AC electrification of Western Line suburban system in Mumbai; it was hauled by WAP 5 or WAP 4E between Mumbai Central and Sawai Madhopur Junction.

North Western Railway completed electrification of Jaipur - Sawai Madhopur rail route in August, 2021. Now it is haul by a Vadodara Loco Shed based WAP 7 locomotive for its end-to-end journey.

== Incidents ==
On 31 July 2023, a RPF constable Chetan Singh on escort duty of 12956 Jaipur–Mumbai Central Superfast Express between Surat and Mumbai Central, shot and killed his senior, assistant sub-inspector Tikaram Meena, and three other passengers in different coaches of the train.

== Gallery ==
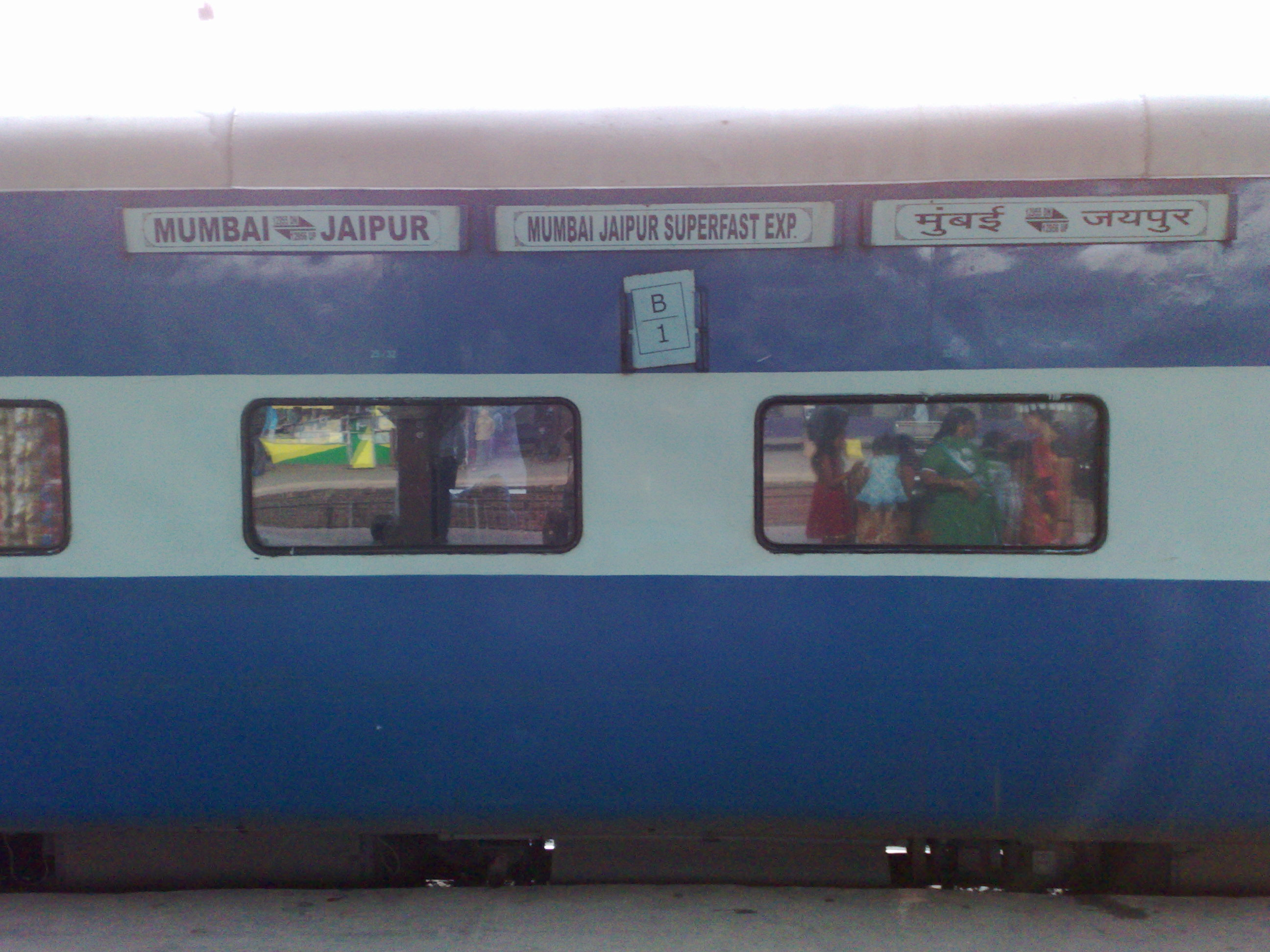
12956 Jaipur Superfast Express

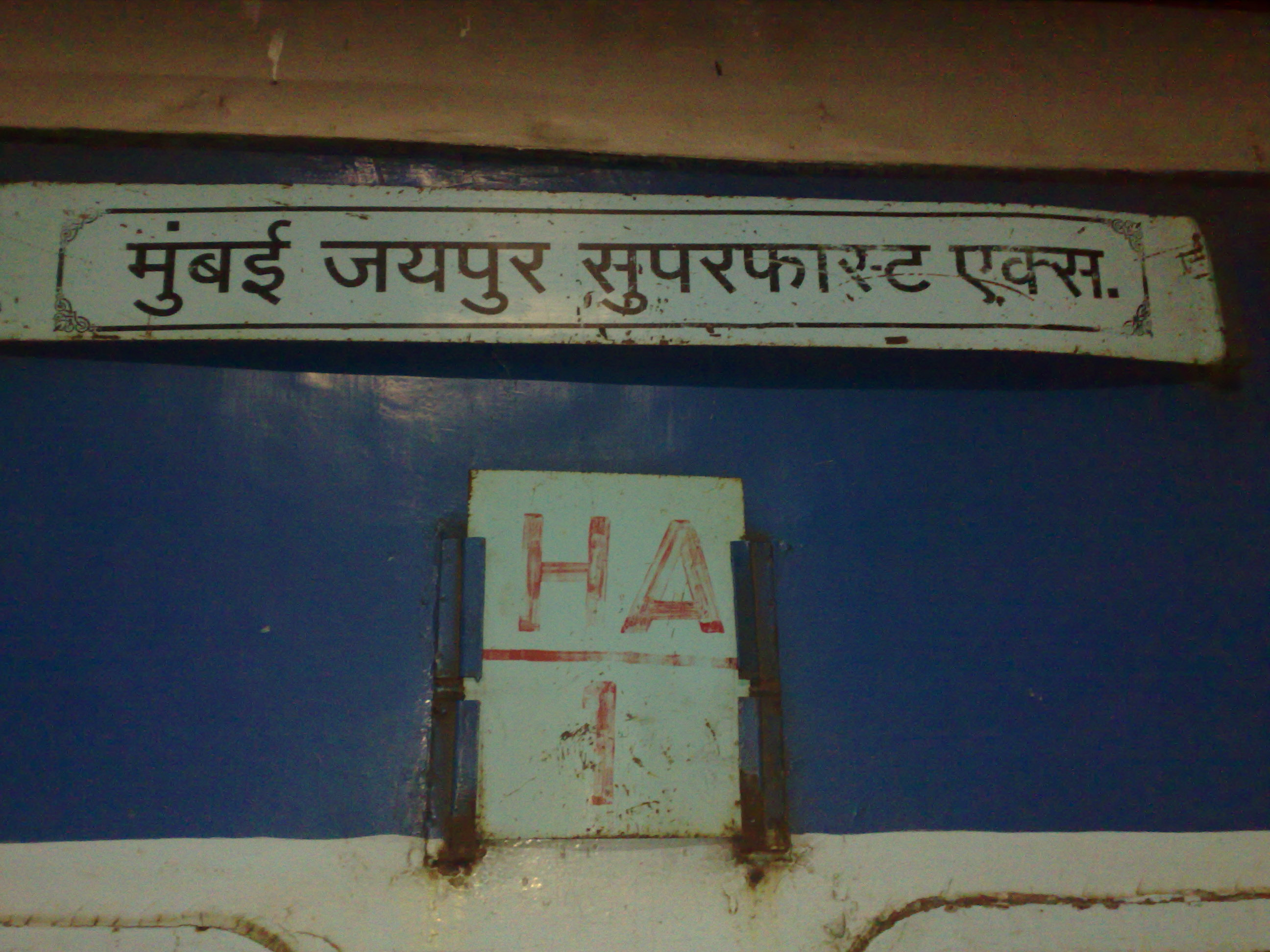
Coach HA1 – 12955 Jaipur Superfast Express

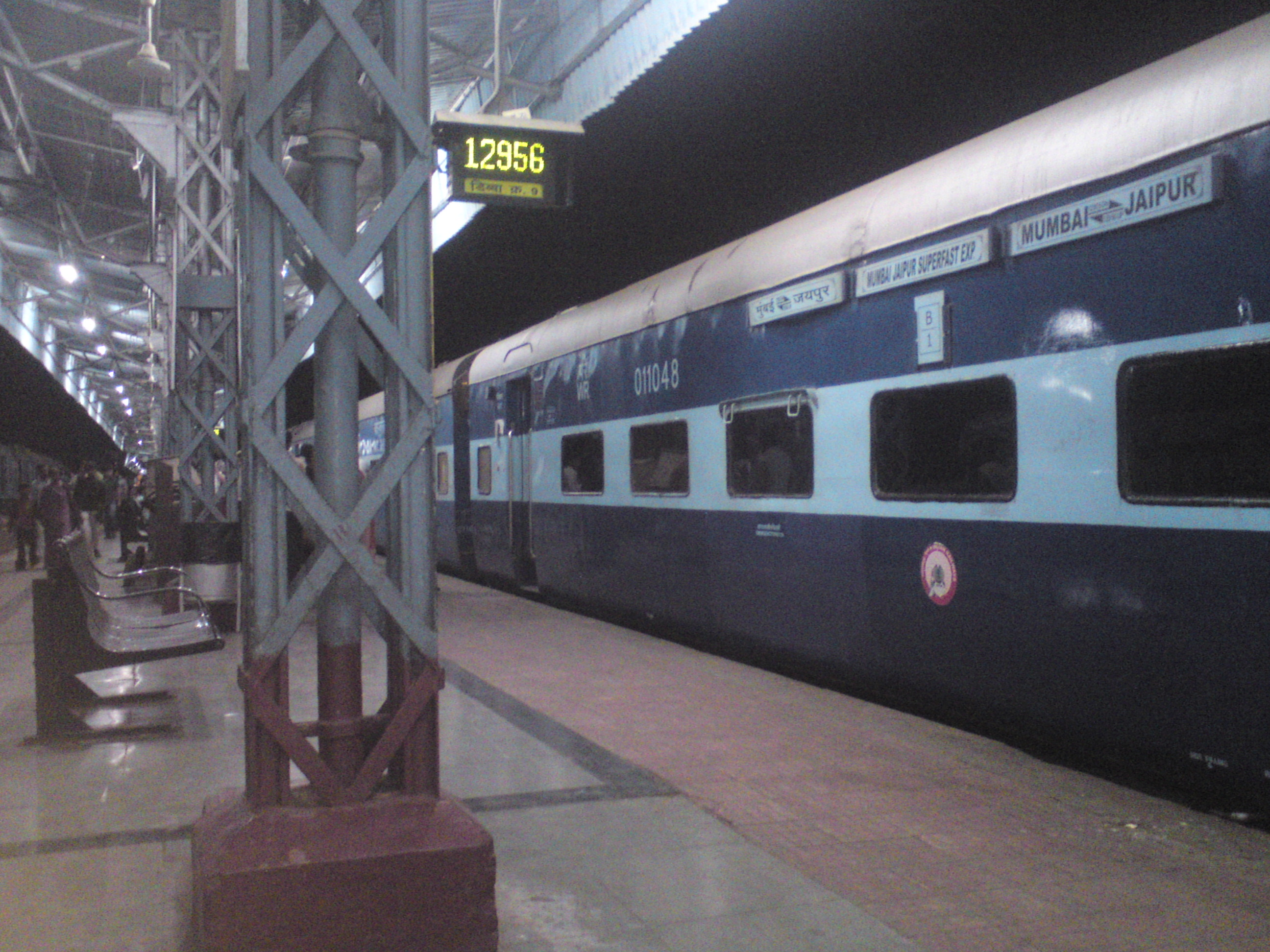
Jaipur Superfast Express at Ratlam Junction

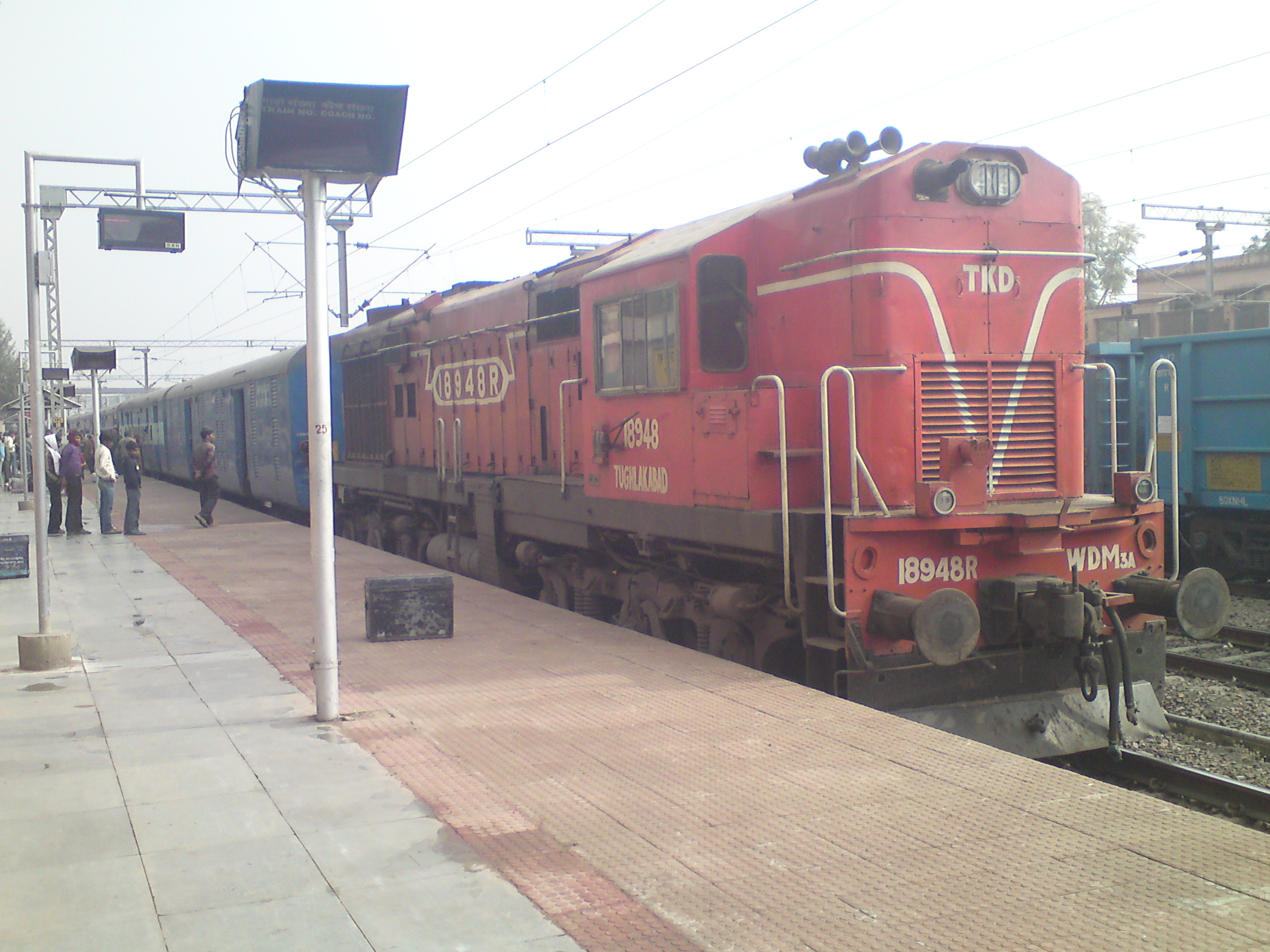
Diesel loco for Jaipur Junction

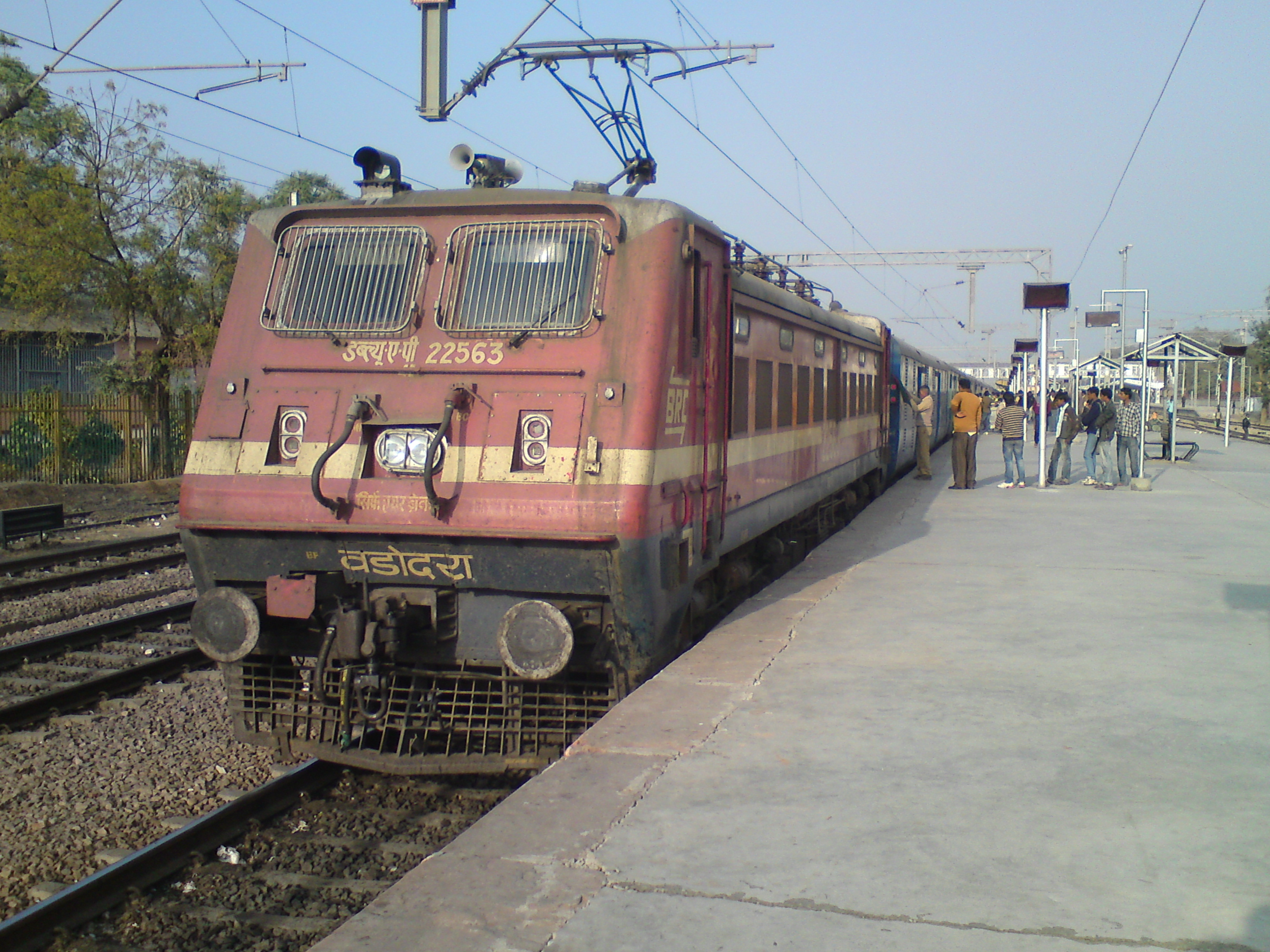
WAP-4 loco up to Mumbai Central at Sawai Madhopur Junction

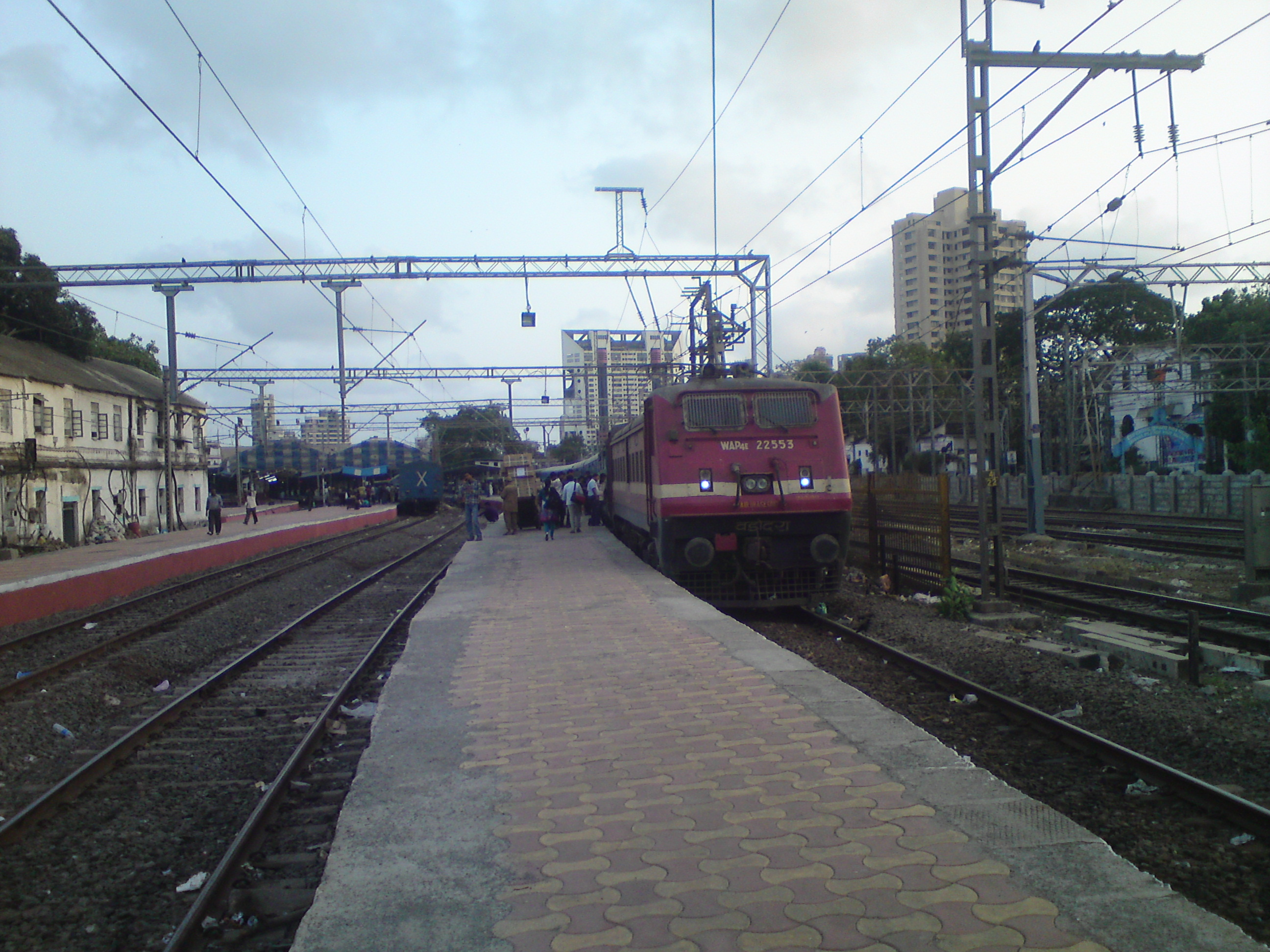
Jaipur Superfast Express ready to depart from Mumbai Central railway station Platform 1

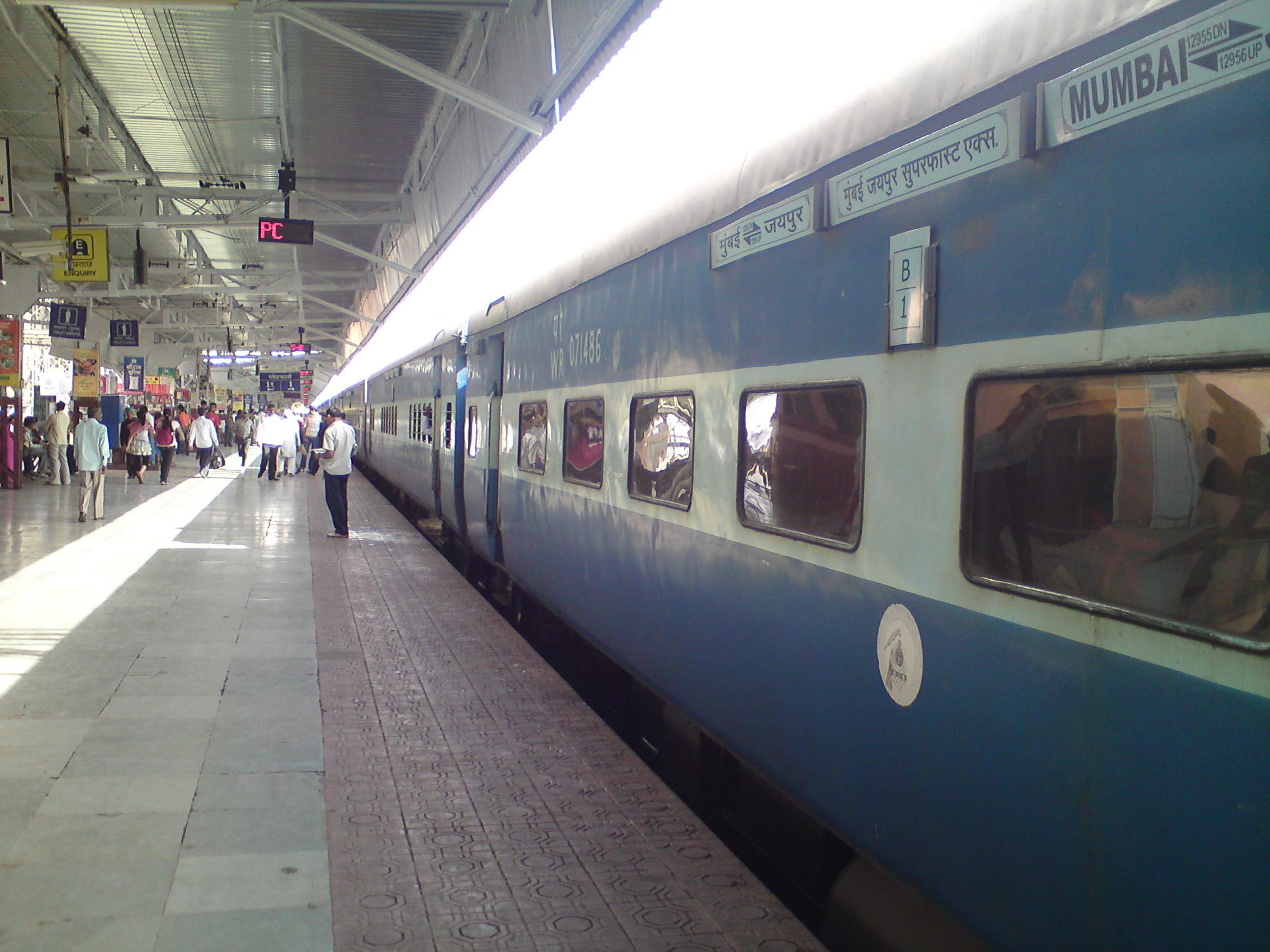
Jaipur Superfast Express at Kota Junction

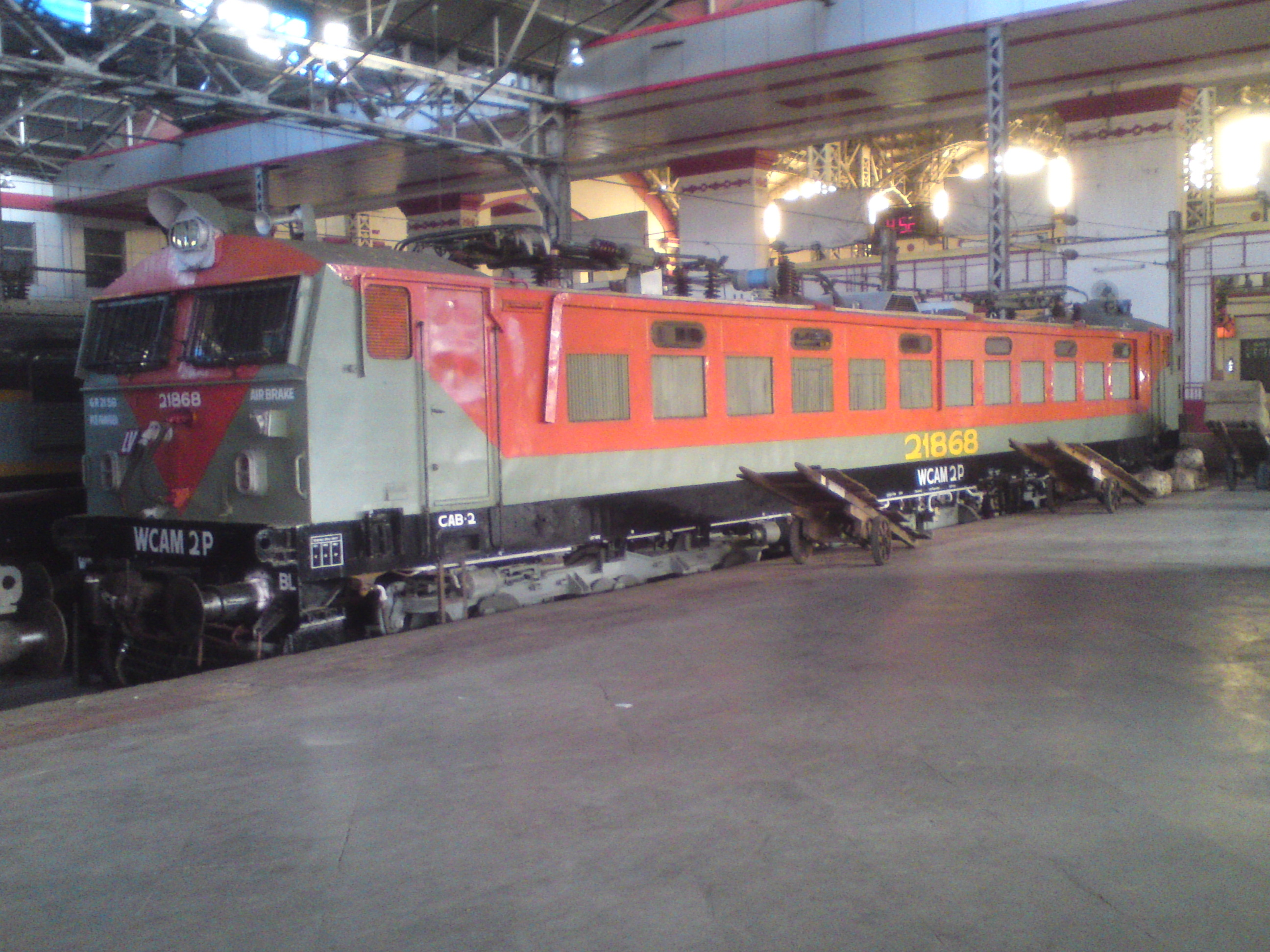
WCAM-2P locomotive was used to haul Jaipur Superfast between MMCT and Vadodara

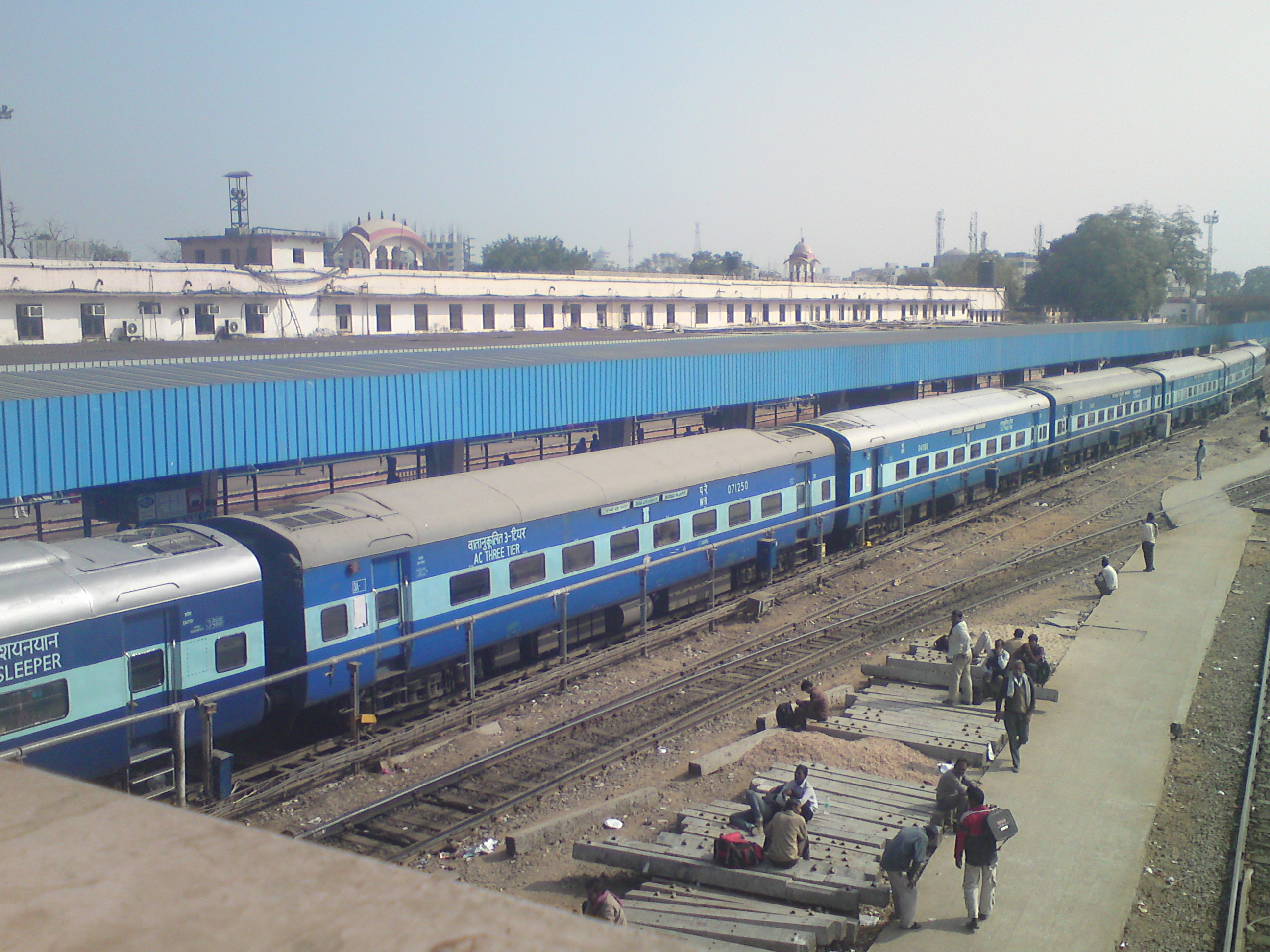
Jaipur Superfast Express at Jaipur railway station
