= Chauth Ka Barwara railway station =

Railway station in Rajasthan, India

Chauth Ka Barwara

General information
- Location: Chauth Ka Barwara, Sawai Madhopur district India
- Coordinates: 26.050593°N 76.149184°E
- System: Indian Railways station
- Owner: Indian Railways
- Operator: North Western Railway
- Line: Jaipur–Sawai Madhopur line
- Platforms: 2
- Tracks: 2

Construction
- Structure type: Standard (on ground station)
- Parking: Yes

Other information
- Status: Functioning
- Station code: CKB
- Zone(s): North Western Railway
- Division(s): Jaipur
Location
- Location within India Location within Rajasthan

Chauth Ka Barwara railway station is a railway station in Sawai Madhopur district, Rajasthan. Its code is CKB. It serves Chauth Ka Barwara. The station consists of 2 platforms. Passenger, Express and Superfast trains halt here.
