= Coimbatore–Jaipur Superfast Express =

Train in India

Coimbatore – Jaipur Express

Overview
- Service type: Superfast Express
- First service: 1 January 1998; 28 years ago
- Current operator: North Western Railways

Route
- Termini: Coimbatore Junction (CBE); Jaipur Junction (JP)
- Stops: 38
- Distance travelled: 2,678.4 km (1,664.3 mi)
- Average journey time: 44 hours 55 minutes
- Service frequency: Weekly
- Train number: 12969/12970

On-board services
- Classes: AC First, AC Two Tier, AC Three Tier, Sleeper, General Unreserved
- Seating arrangements: Yes
- Sleeping arrangements: Yes
- Catering facilities: Yes

Technical
- Rolling stock: LHB coach
- Track gauge: 1,676 mm (5 ft 6 in)
- Operating speed: 59 km/h (37 mph) average with halts
Route map
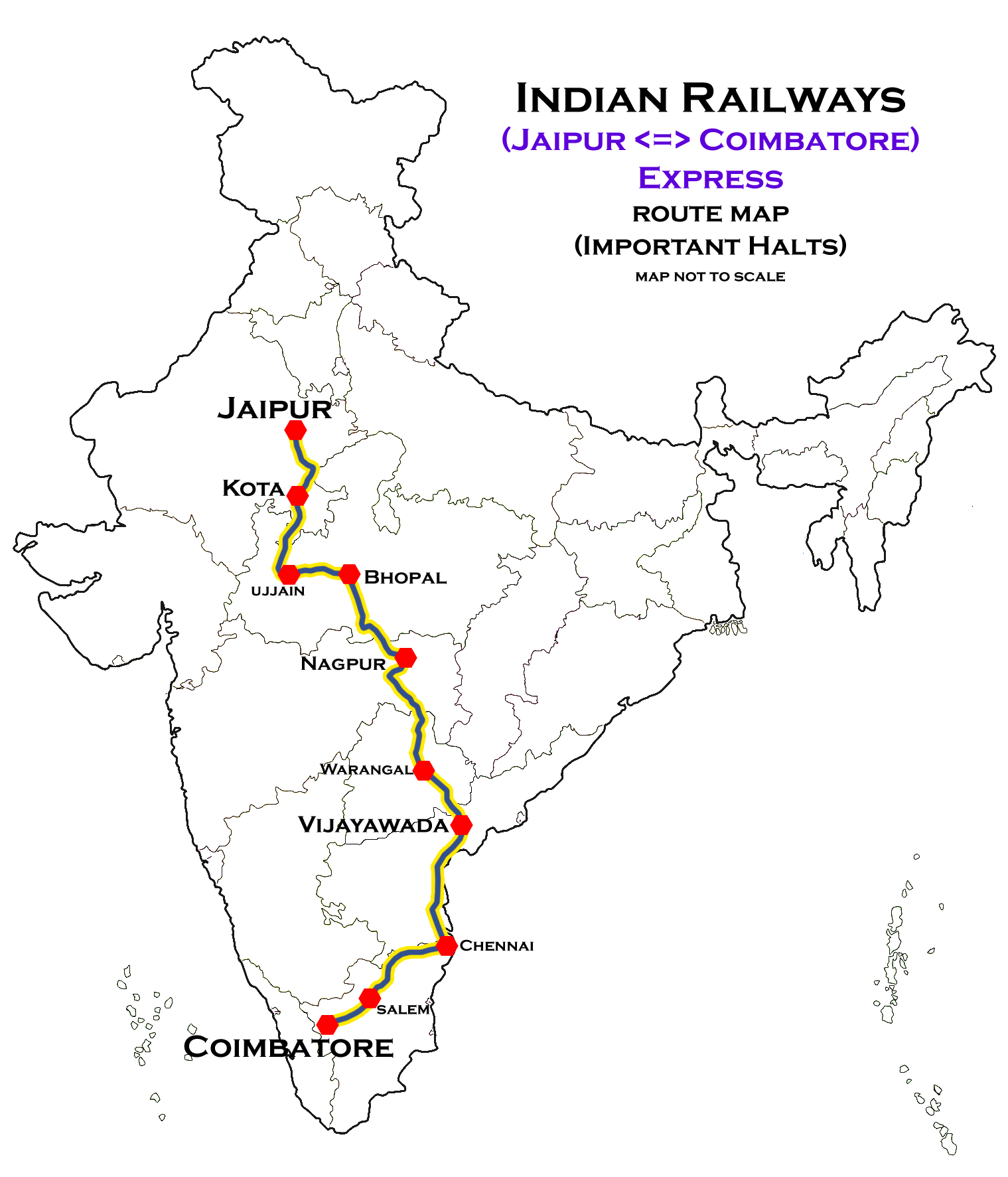

The Coimbatore–Jaipur Superfast Express is a Superfast Express weekly train run by Indian Railways between Coimbatore Junction in Tamil Nadu and Jaipur in Rajasthan.It runs with the numbers 12969/12970. It is now running with LHB coaches from January 2021.

== Service and schedule ==
The train leaves Jaipur on every Tuesdays at 7.35pm and reaches Coimbatore on every Thursdays at 4.50pm. In return it leaves Coimbatore at 9.25am on every Fridays, to reach Jaipur on Sundays at 6.45am by covering the total distance of 2,678.4 kilometres (1,664.3 mi) in approximately 45 hours.

== Route and stations ==
This train passes through 37 intermediate stations including Sawai Madhopur, Kota, Nagda, Ujjain, Bhopal, Itarsi, Nagpur, Balharshah, Warangal, Vijayawada, Gudur, Chennai Central, Katpadi, Jolarpettai, Salem and Erode. It gets its reversal done three times in its journey at Sawai Madhopur, Nagda and at Chennai Central.

== Coach and rake ==
- 1 AC First Class Cum AC Two Tier
- 2 AC Two Tier
- 6 AC Three Tier
- 6 Sleeper Class
- 1 Pantry Car
- 4 General Unreserved
- 2 Generator Cars

It shares its rakes with

1. Jaipur - Chennai Central Express
2. Jaipur - Mysore Express

The train is pulled by Erode WAP-4, Vadodara WAP-4 and Bhagat Ki Kothi WDP-4B.
