= Chennai Central–Jaipur Superfast Express =

Train in India

Chennai Central – Jaipur Superfast Express

Overview
- Service type: Superfast Express
- First service: 1 January 1998; 28 years ago
- Current operator: North Western Railways

Route
- Termini: Chennai Central (MAS); Jaipur Junction (JP)
- Stops: 31
- Distance travelled: 2,185 km (1,358 mi)
- Average journey time: 37 hours 05 minutes
- Service frequency: Weekly
- Train number: 12967/12968

On-board services
- Classes: AC First Class, AC Two Tier, AC Three Tier, Sleeper Class, General Unreserved
- Seating arrangements: Yes
- Sleeping arrangements: Yes
- Catering facilities: Yes

Technical
- Rolling stock: LHB coach
- Track gauge: 1,676 mm (5 ft 6 in)
- Operating speed: 59 km/h (37 mph) average with halts
Route map
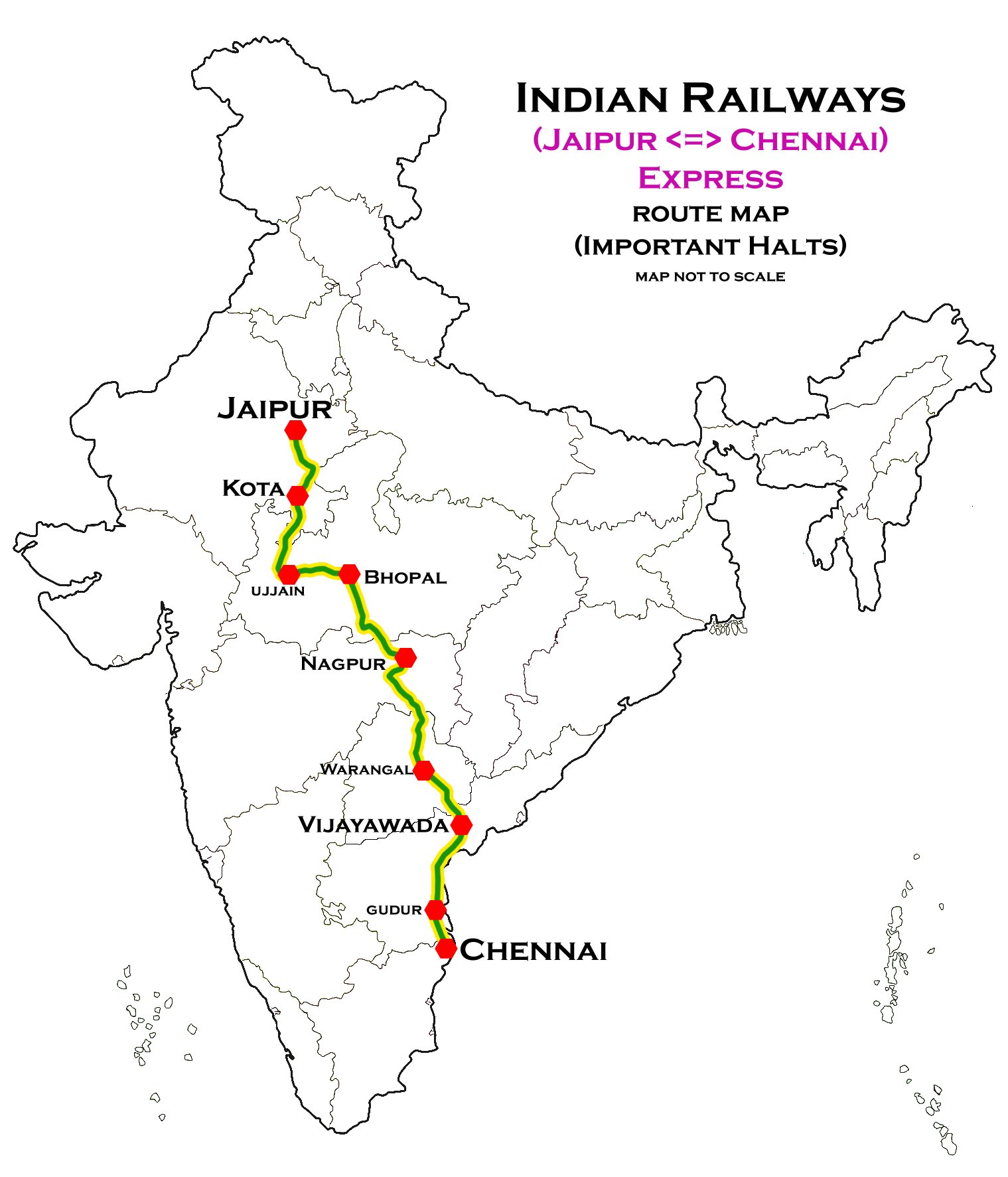

The 12967/12968 Chennai Central–Jaipur Superfast Express is a Superfast Express which belongs to North Western Railway zone that runs between Chennai Central of Tamil Nadu and Jaipur Junction of Rajasthan in India. It runs with highly refurbished LHB coaches from January 2021.

== Service and schedule ==
The train departs Jaipur from every Fridays and Sundays at 19.35hrs to reach Chennai Central on every Sundays and Tuesdays at 08.20hrs. In return it leaves from Chennai at 17.40hrs on every Sundays and Tuesdays to reach Jaipur at 06.45 on every Tuesdays and Thursdays, by covering the total distance of 2,185 kilometres (1,358 mi) in approximately 36 hours.

== Route and stations ==
This train passes through 30 intermediate stations including Sawai Madhopur, Kota, Nagda, Ujjain, Shujalpur, Bhopal, Itarsi, Nagpur, Balharshah, Warangal, Vijayawada and Gudur

== Coach and rake ==
It has totally 22 LHB coaches.

- 1 AC First Class Cum AC Two Tier,
- 2 AC Two Tier
- 6 AC Three Tier
- 6 Sleeper Class
- 1 Pantry Car
- 4 General Unreserved
- 2 Generator Cars

It shares its rakes with

1. Jaipur - Coimbatore Superfast Express

2. Jaipur - Mysuru Superfast Express

The train is pulled by Erode WAP-4, Royapuram WAP-7 Lallaguda WAP-4 and Abu Road WDM-3A.
