= Ramganj Mandi Junction =

Railway station in Rajasthan, India

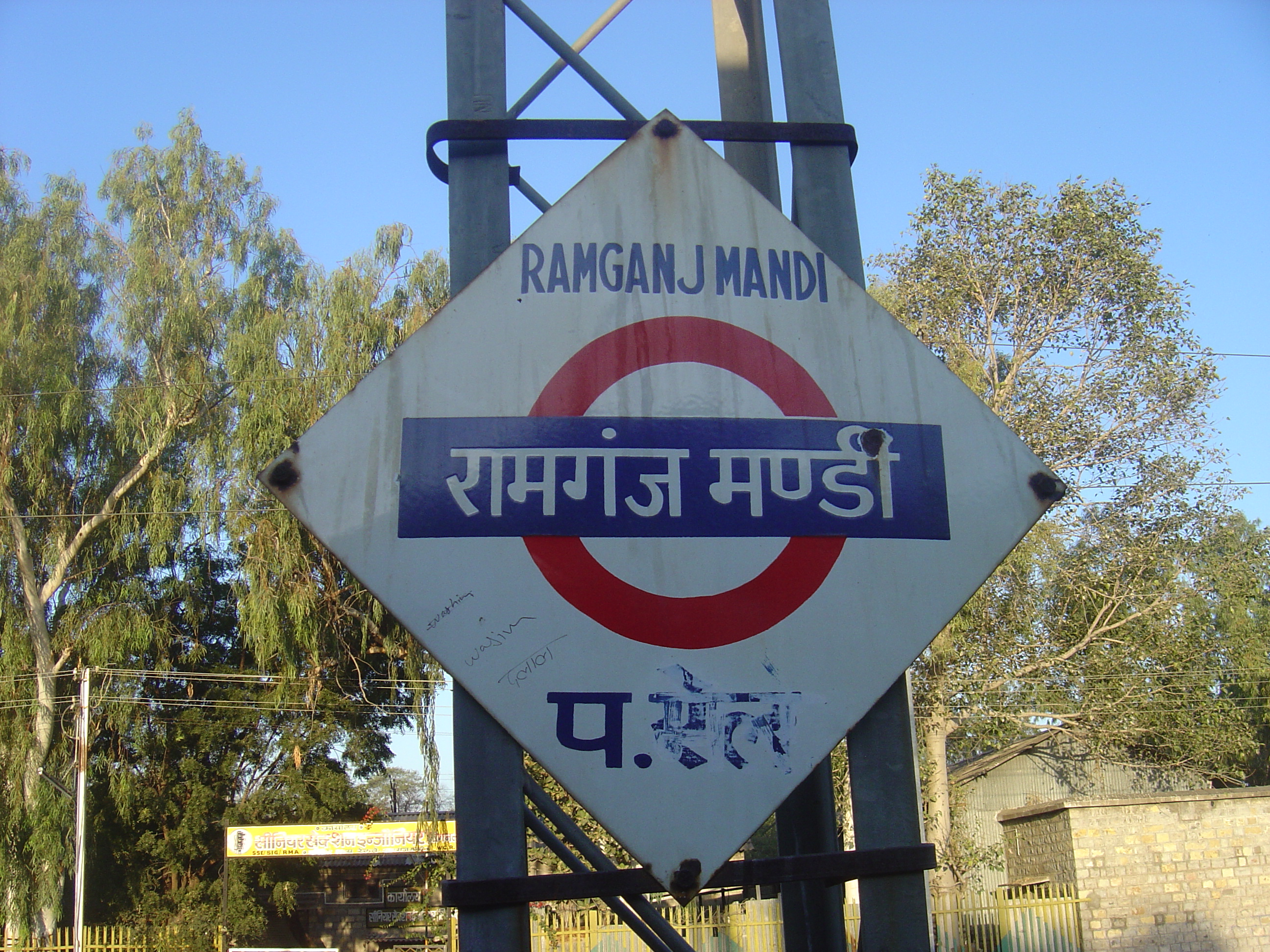

General information
- Location: Gandhi Chowk, bazar no. 1 Ramganj Mandi
- Coordinates: 24.6440°N 75.9398°E
- Elevation: 358 metres (1,175 ft)
- System: Indian Railways station
- Owner: Indian Railways
- Line: Delhi–Mumbai Rajdhani Route Ramganj Mandi–Jhalawar–Bhopal (under construction)
- Platforms: 3
- Tracks: 4

Construction
- Structure type: Standard on-ground station
- Platform levels: Single (ground level)
- Parking: Yes

Other information
- Status: Functioning
- Station code: RMA
- Zone(s): West Central Railway zone
- Division(s): Kota

History
- Opened: 1912

Passengers
- 4500 (daily)
Location

Ramganj Mandi is a railway station in Ramganj Mandi, Rajasthan, India. It is categorized as "NSG-4" station in Kota division of West Central Railway zone of Indian Railways.

== Rail lines ==
Ramganj Mandi has the following rail lines:

- Kota–Nagda–Ratlam section, existing:

Services operational from Delhi and Northwest India (Ludhiana-Hisar-Jaipur) to central and south India via Ratlam, it forms an important link on the busy Delhi–Mumbai trunk route.

- Bhopal-Ramganj Mandi line, under-construction with target completion by December 2027:

This line will provide shorter route from Ludiana-Hisar-Jaipur-Kota to Bhopal. In November 2024, 42% work was complete with 115 km out of total of 276 km already operationalised. Ramganj Mandi–Jhalawar City-Kalisindh Thermal Power Plant section of this line is already operational.

== Services ==
Service on the new Ramganj Mandi–Jhalawar City section started on 21 June 2013 with a daily passenger train to Kota Junction; freight service began on 23 March 2014.

== See also ==
- Future of rail transport in India
