= Sawai Madhopur Junction railway station =

Railway station in Rajasthan, India

Sawai Madhopur Junction (SWM)
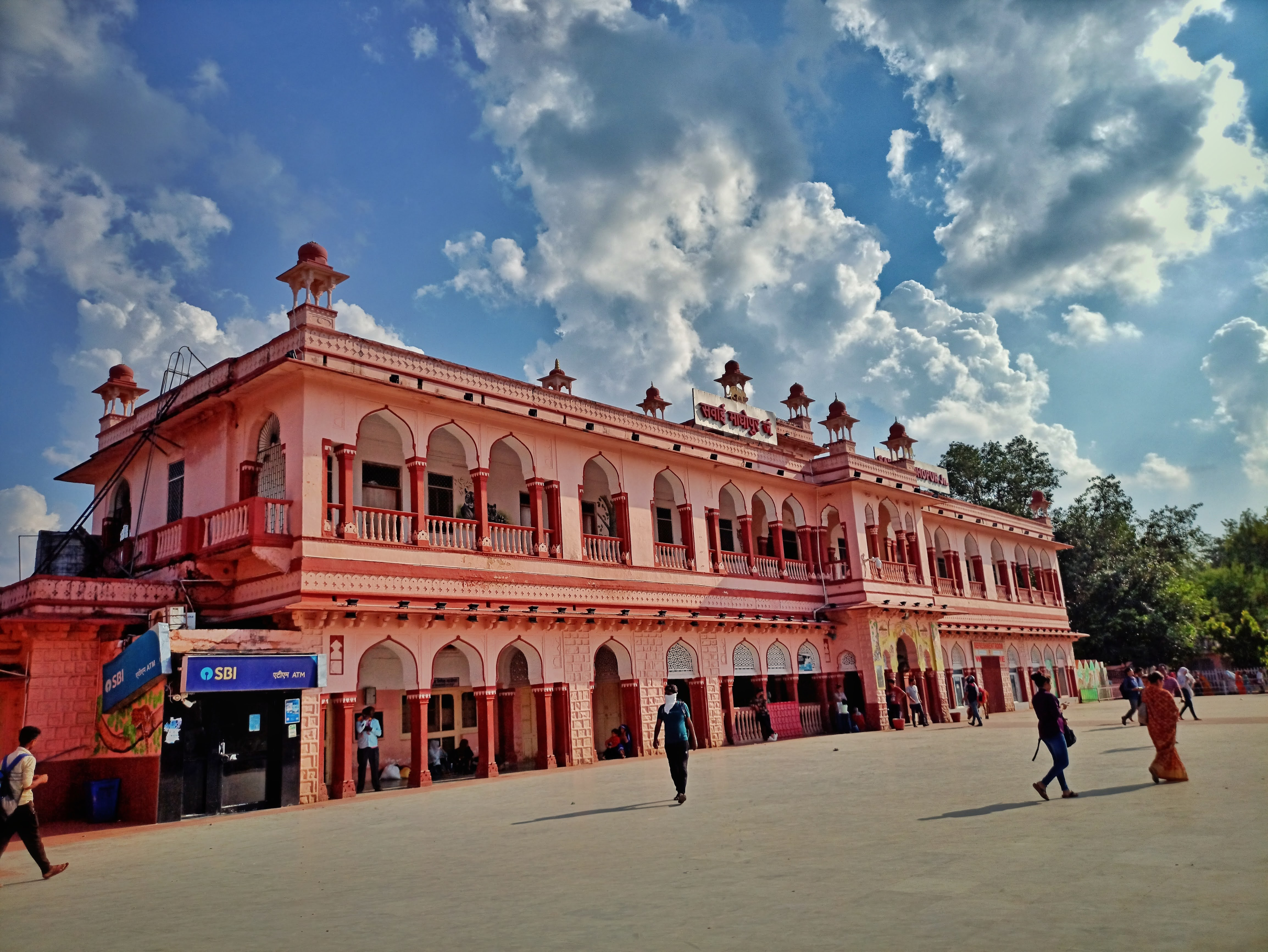
- Main Entrance of Sawai Madhopur Junction Railway Station

General information
- Location: Sawai Madhopur, Rajasthan; India
- Coordinates: 26°01′08″N 76°21′26″E
- Elevation: 265.785 metres (872.00 ft)
- System: Indian Railways junction station, Regional Rail, express train and passenger train station and light rail station
- Owner: Indian Railways
- Operator: West Central Railway zone
- Lines: New Delhi–Mumbai main line, Kota–Rewari railway line, Sawai Madhopur–Sheopur–Shivpuri–Jhansi railway line, Jaipur–Sawai Madhopur line
- Platforms: 4 (1, 2, 3, 4)
- Tracks: 6 Broad Gauge
- Connections: Auto, taxi and bus stands

Construction
- Structure type: Standard (on-ground station)
- Parking: Available
- Accessible: Available

Other information
- Status: Functioning
- Station code: SWM
- Zone(s): West Central Railway zone
- Division(s): Kota

History
- Opened: 1905; 121 years ago
- Electrified: 2020; 6 years ago
Location
- Location within Rajasthan
- Interactive map

Sawai Madhopur Junction railway station (station code: SWM) is a major junction railway station on the New Delhi–Mumbai main line in Rajasthan. It is operated by the Kota Division of West Central Railway and serves as an important interchange between the Delhi–Mumbai and Jaipur–Mumbai rail routes.

== Administration ==
This station falling under Kota railway division of West Central Railway zone has been classified under 'NSG-3' category.

== Lines ==
The main lines passing through Sawai Madhopur are:

- Mumbai–New Delhi line via Kota (Electrified Triple Broad-Gauge Line) :- Trunk Route 3 of Indian Railways, runs for 1,389 kilometres (863 mi) from New Delhi to Mumbai via Mathura, Bharatpur, Kota, Nagda, Ratlam, Vadodara, Surat, Valsad, Vapi & Vasai.
- Jaipur–Sawai Madhopur line (single Electrified broad-gauge line) :- Covering 132 kilometres (82 mi) and currently under doubling, this line connects Jaipur with many parts of India.

== Important Trains ==
A few Important trains stopping at Sawai Madhopur are:

- August Kranti Rajdhani Express
- Golden Temple Mail
- Paschim Express
- Swaraj Express
- Sarvodaya Express
- Ranthambore Express
- Parasnath Express
- Ananya Express
- Ziyarat Express
- Azimabad Express
- Vande Bharat Express
- Awadh Express
- Dwarka Express
- Dayodaya Express

and so on.

== Trains Lost ==
Before 2007, the Agra - Achhnera - Bharatpur - Bandikui line was Meter Gauge, hence many trains to Jaipur used Sawai Madhopur line. But from 2007, Sawai Madhopur lost many trains which permanently diverted to Agra - Achhnera - Bharatpur - Bandikui line. Notable among these trains are:-

- Both pairs of Howrah-Jodhpur Express (12307/12308 & 22307/22308 Jodhpur/Bikaner Superfast).
- Both pairs of Bikaner-Guwahati Express (15631/15632 & 15633/15634 Bikaner/Barmer Express).
- Ajmer-Sealdah Express (12987/12988 Sealdah-Ajmer Superfast).
- All 3 Marudhar Express (14853/14854, 14863/14864 & 14865/14866 Marudhar Express)
- Ranthambore Express (12465/12466 Ranthambore Express)

== Further extension ==
A Final Location Survey for 6.98 km long Sawai Madhopur–bypass line was sanctioned in February 2020 after construction of which trains from Jaipur can run up to Kota and beyond without loco reversal at Sawai Madhopur. A delay of more than 30 minutes for an engine change at Sawai Madhopur will thus be avoided. The estimated cost of the linking project is Rs 252 crore.

The government has approved the construction of a new broad-gauge line between Ajmer (Nasirabad) and Sawai Madhopur (Chauth Ka Barwara) via Tonk in Rajasthan. The total length of the new line will be 165 km. The line is planned to be completed in eight years during the 13th Plan period. It will be an alternate route between Chittaurgarh and Sawai Madhopur on the Delhi–Ahmedabad route.

== Luxury tourist trains ==
Several Luxury trains make a scheduled stop at Sawai Madhopur Junction on their eight-day round trip of tourist destinations.

- Palace on Wheels
- Royal Rajasthan on Wheels
- Maharaja Express
- Deccan Odyssey

The station got the award for the Best Tourist Friendly Railway Station by Lok Sabha Speaker Sumitra Mahajan at a glittering ceremony at Vigyan Bhawan in New Delhi on the occasion of the Union Tourism Ministry's ‘National Tourism Awards for the year 2014-2015’. Earlier, Sawai Madhopur railway station has also been awarded as the ‘First Heritage Railway Station’.

== Initiative ==
The Indian Railways considered the proposal of the World Wildlife Fund to promote sanctuaries as tourist destinations, to showcase jungle life and to spread awareness about conservation and promote tourism, and began the campaign with railway stations at Sawai Madhopur and Bharatpur Junction for pictorial representation of natural habitats, wildlife, trees, bushes, waterbodies. These paintings have made the railway station a living art museum.

== Gallery ==
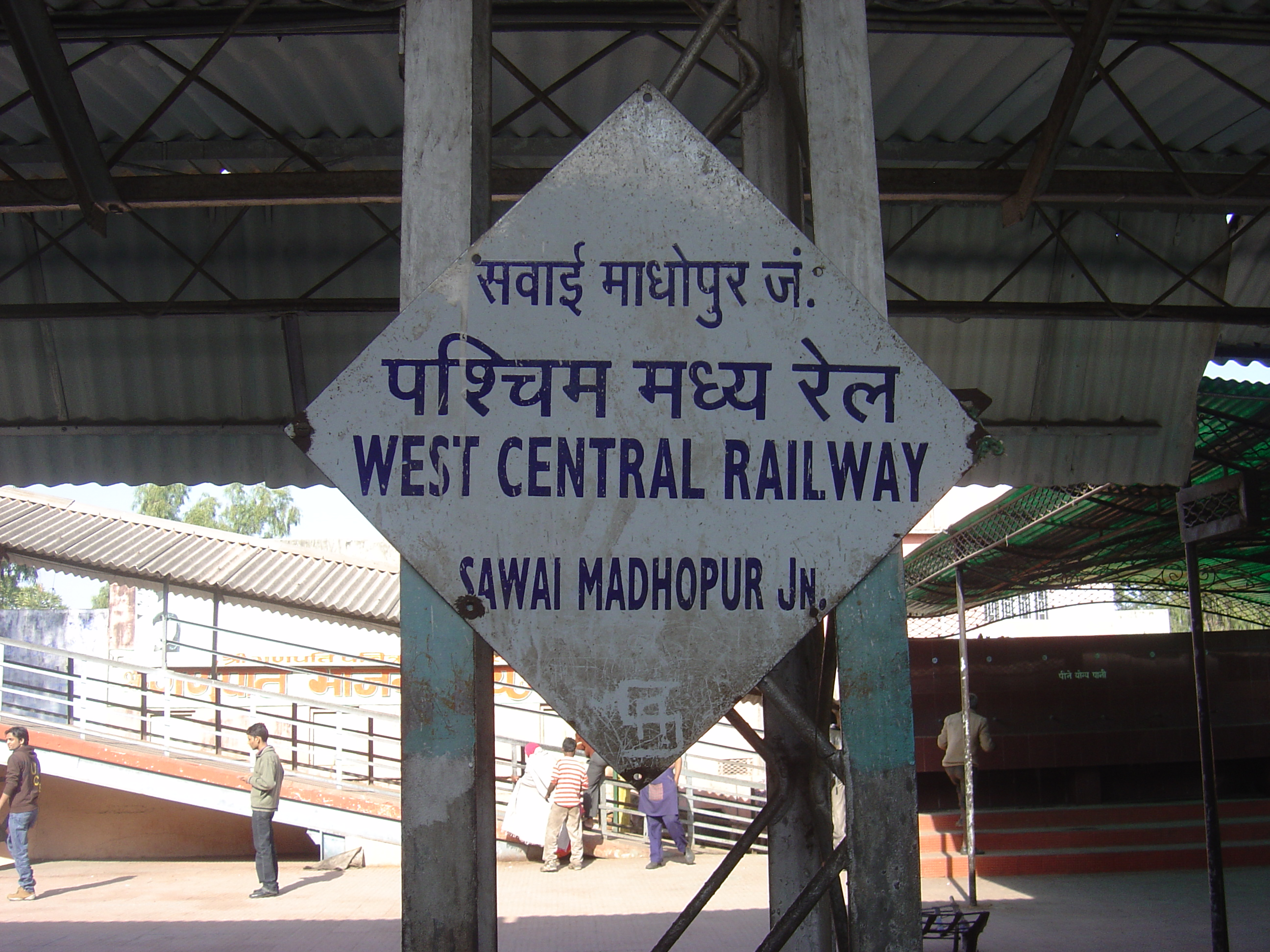
Sawai Madhopur Junction platform board

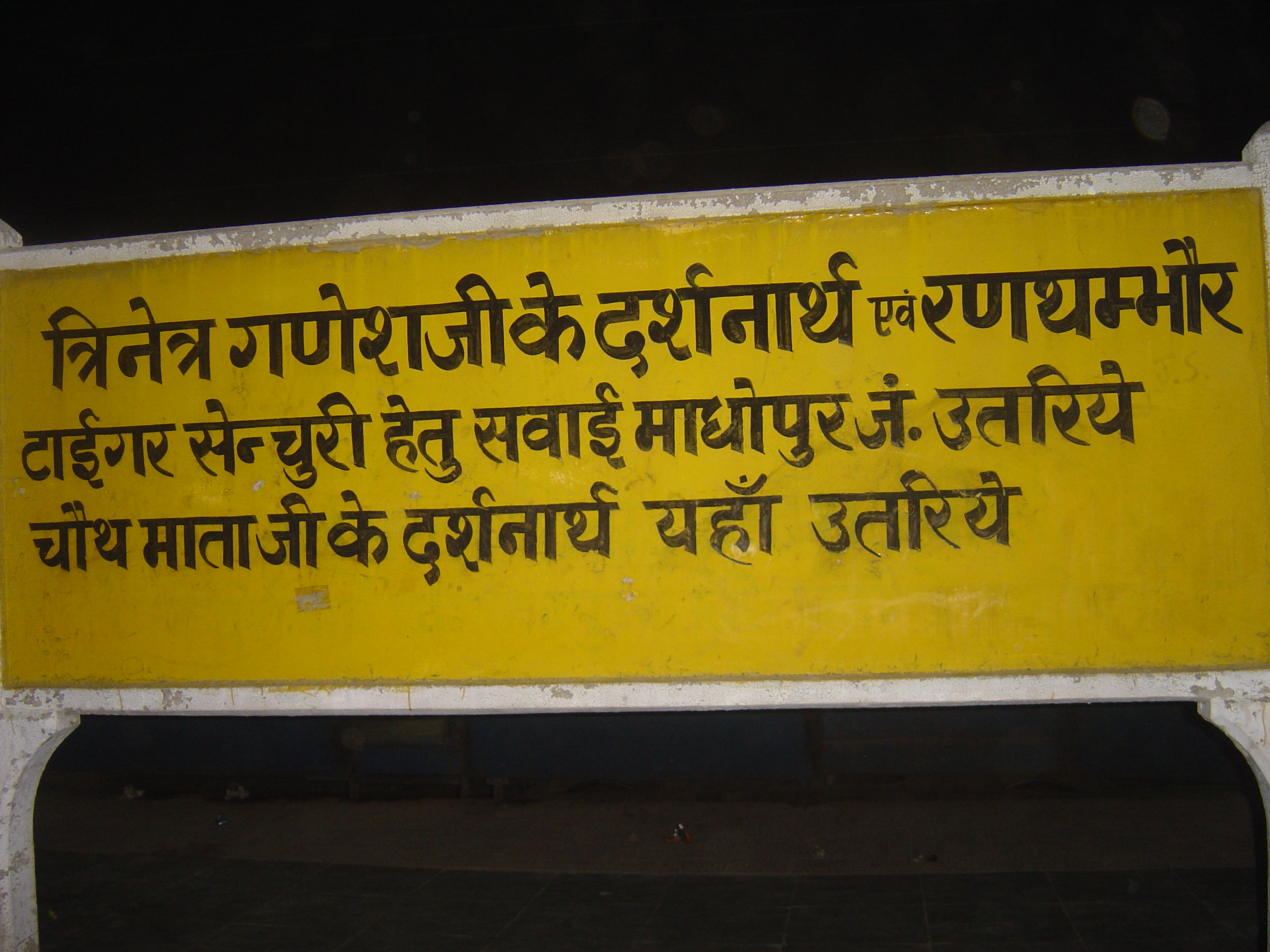
Sawai Madhopur Junction – Info board

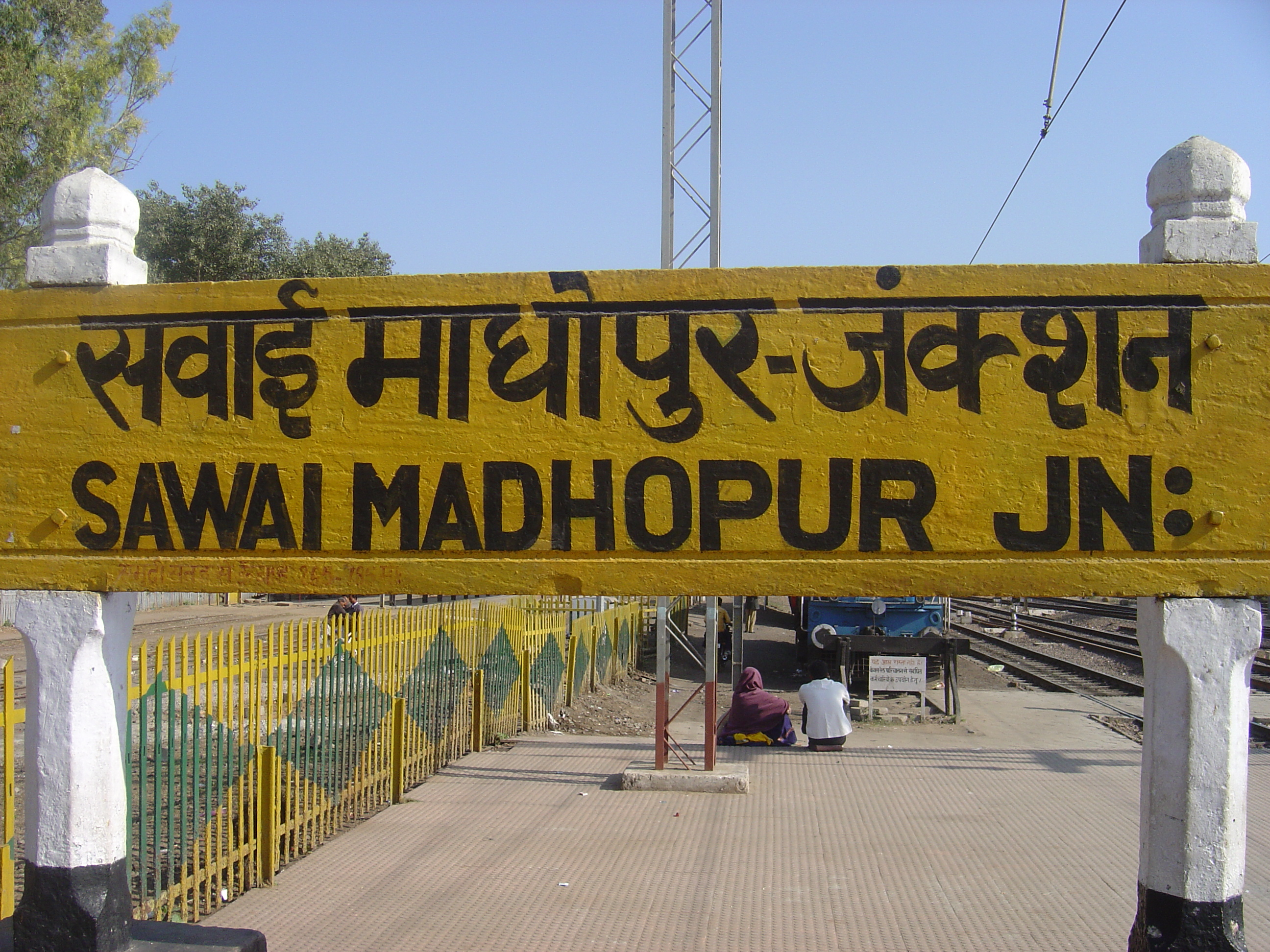
Sawai Madhopur railway station

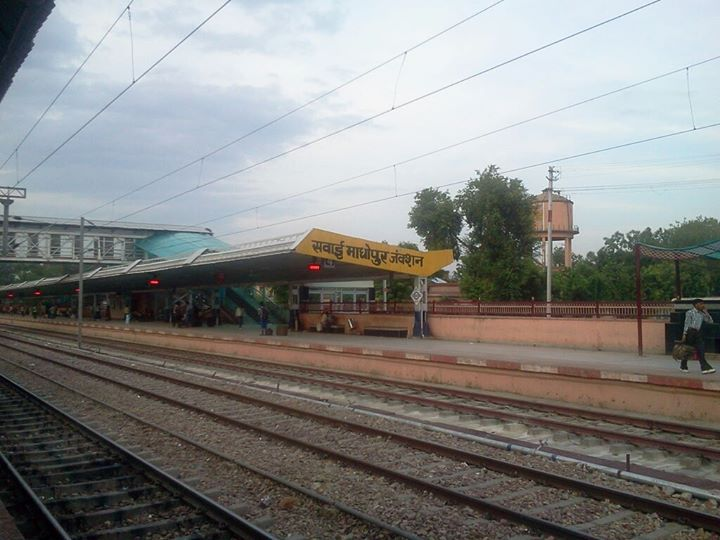
Platform-4

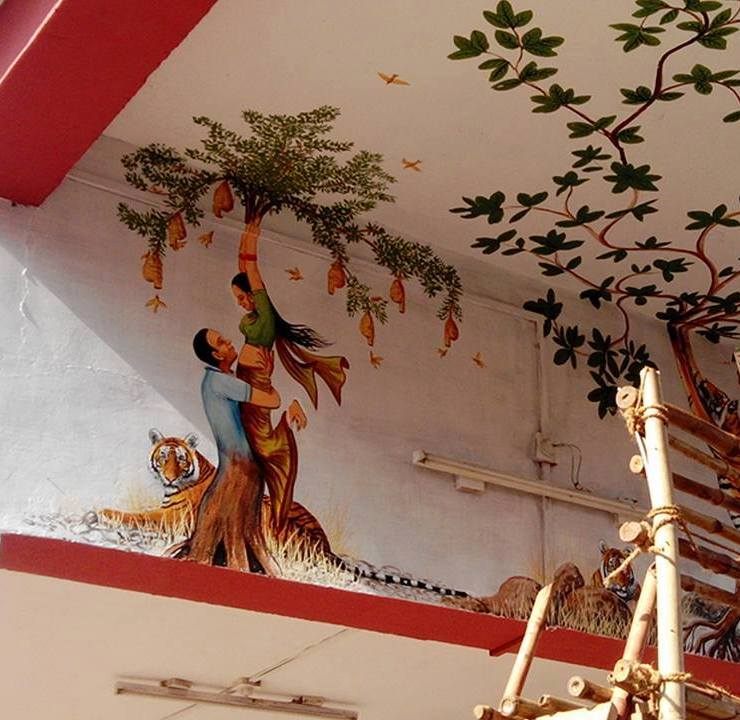
Wildlife image

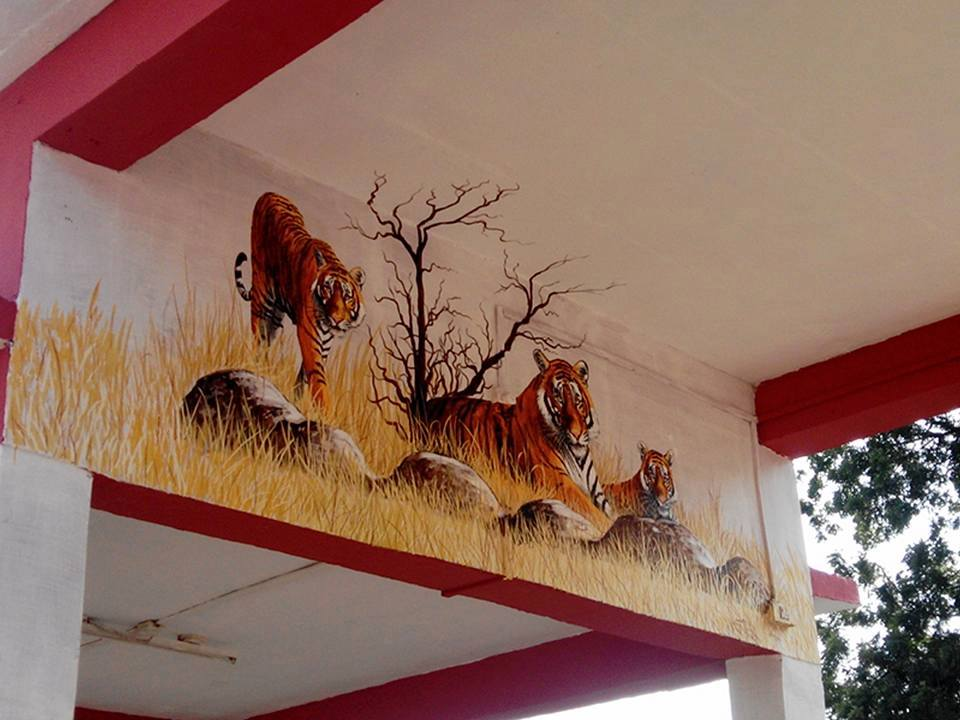
Wildlife image

== See also ==
- Ranthambore National Park
- Ranthambore Fort
- Sawai Madhopur
- Sawai Madhopur District
- Rajiv Gandhi Regional Museum of Natural History
- Shilpgram, Sawai Madhopur
