= Chambal =

Chambal may refer to:

- Chambal River, river in the Indian states Madhya Pradesh and Rajasthan
  - Chambal (region), the region of the river in India
  - Chambal division, in the state of Madhya Pradesh in India
  - Chambal Express, passenger train in India
  - Chambal Garden, garden on the river's bank in Kota, Rajasthan, India
  - Chambaleshwar Dam, dam in Madhya Pradesh, India
- Chambal (film), a 2019 Indian Kannada-language thriller film
- Chambal Fertilisers, fertilizer manufacturer in India
