= Kota Airport =

Airport of Rajasthan, India

- IATA: KTU; ICAO: VIKO

Summary
- Airport type: Public
- Operator: Airports Authority of India
- Serves: Kota
- Location: Kota, India
- Elevation AMSL: 273 m (896 ft)
- Coordinates: 25°09′36.39″N 075°50′44.27″E

Map
- Location of the airport in Rajasthan KTU (India)

Runways
Direction	Length		Surface
Direction	m	ft	Surface
08/26	1,200	4,000	Asphalt

Statistics (April 2025 – March 2026)
- Passengers: 165 (▼43.5%)
- Aircraft movements: 54 (▼37.2%)
- Cargo tonnage: 0 ( 0%)
- Source: AAI

Kota Airport (IATA: KTU, ICAO: VIKO) is a domestic airport in Kota in the state of Rajasthan, India.

== History ==
Spread over 152 acres, Kota Airport was originally built by the royal family of the princely state of Kota and was taken over by the government in 1951. This Airport Also Known As Rajputana Airport. Originally serviced by Indian Airlines Dakota aircraft and later by Vayudoot and Jagson Airlines, shutdown of major industries and Kota becoming a major railway junction effected decreased demand for air transport and the withdrawal of the airlines.

== Current status ==
The airport is spread over 447 acres, with one 1200 metre runway. The terminal building has an area of 400 square metres and can handle 50 passengers per hour. The airport is suitable for Code-B type of aircraft. The airport is surrounded by densely populated areas and hence acquisition of land for further expansion is not feasible. Since 1997, there have been no scheduled operations at this airport, though Air India examined the feasibility of starting flights to Mumbai and Delhi. The last airline to fly to Kota was Vayudoot. In 2005, it was reported that Airports Authority of India, which maintains the airport spends Rs. 6.3 million annually on maintenance, whereas the income is Rs. 600,000, while six acres of the airports property has been encroached upon by slums.

== Development of Greenfield airport at Kota ==
The representative of Rajasthan Government intimated that runway length of Existing Kota Airport is only 4000 feet, which restricts flight operations under the UDAN Regional Connectivity Scheme. Hence, a new Greenfield Airport is to be constructed in Kota. State Government has earmarked required land for this purpose. State Government has provided Meteorological Information of past 10 years and AAI has carried out pre-feasibility survey & provided its report to the State Government. 1250 Acres of land has to be acquired by the State Government and handed over to AAI for development of New Greenfield Airport. A tripartite Memorandum of Understanding was signed in July 2024 between the Airports Authority of India (AAI), the Urban Development Department, and the Civil Aviation Department of Rajasthan Government for the development of the greenfield airport. On May 05, 2025, the ministry of Civil Aviation granted in-principle approval for the establishment of the Greenfield airport.
