= Geparnath Mahadev Temple =

- गेपरनाथ महादेव मंदिर
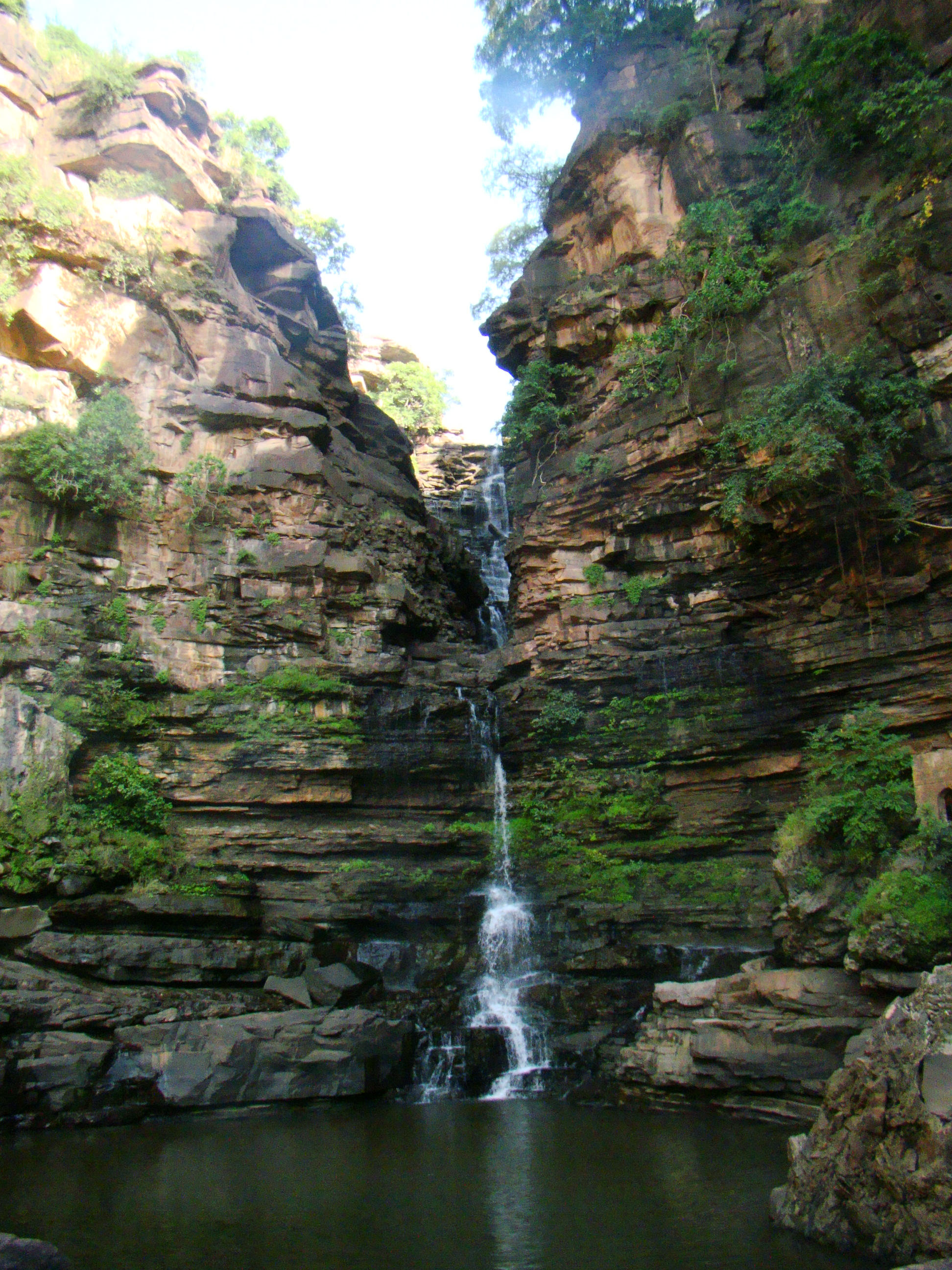
- A view of Geparnath Mahadev Temple

- Location in Rajasthan

Religion
- Affiliation: Hinduism
- District: Kota, Rajasthan
- Deity: Shiva
- Festival: Maha Shivaratri

Location
- State: Rajasthan
- Country: India
- Interactive map of Geparnath Mahadev Temple
- Coordinates: 25.06826°N 75.71438°E

Architecture
- Creator: Wife of King Bhoj
- Established: 1520

Geparnath Mahadev Temple is a Hindu temple dedicated to the deity Shiva, located near Kota in Rajasthan, India. A natural water stream flows over the Shiva Lingam, which is used primarily for the Abhisheka ritual (sacred bathing). The temple is also a host to the annual Maha Shivaratri festival, which attracts devotees from the surrounding region. The Temple is visited alike by both pilgrims and tourists.

== History ==
The temple is traditionally believed to have been commissioned in the 16th century by the wife of Raja Bhoj. Situated approximately 400 feet (121 meters) within a hillside, it is accessible by a descent of approximately 350 steps.

== Architectural features ==
The temple stands on the banks of the Chambal River. A natural reservoir is located nearby, where devotees bathe as part of a religious practice.

== Conservation and Improvements ==
Since 1961, the temple has been under the protection of the Archaeological Survey of India, which is responsible for the preservation of its historical culture and architectural heritage. Local residents have proposed infrastructure improvements to facilitate access to the temple.

== Incidents ==
- 2008 step collapse: A portion of the temple’s steps collapsed, trapping 135 visitors. The incident resulted in three fatalities. Rescue operations were carried out by the Rajasthan Armed Constabulary (RAC), with assistance from cranes and helicopters. Among those rescued were thirty-five children and thirty women.
- 2022 drowning incident: Two students, one from Bihar and the other from Madhya Pradesh, drowned in the temple’s reservoir.

== See also ==
- Bhimlat Mahadev Temple
- Kishore Sagar Talab
