= Kota, Rajasthan =

Kota Koṭā (Hindi)
- Metropolis
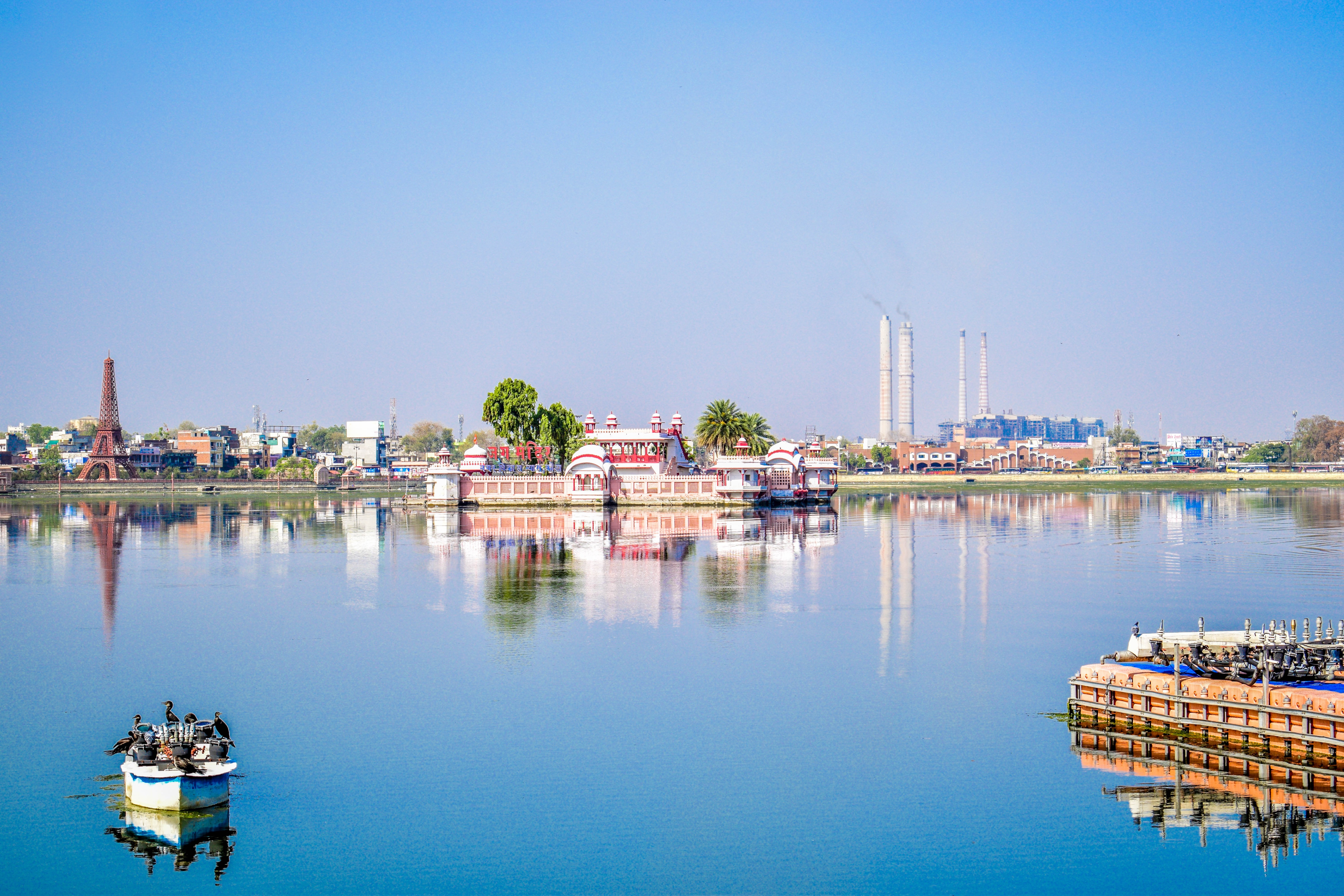
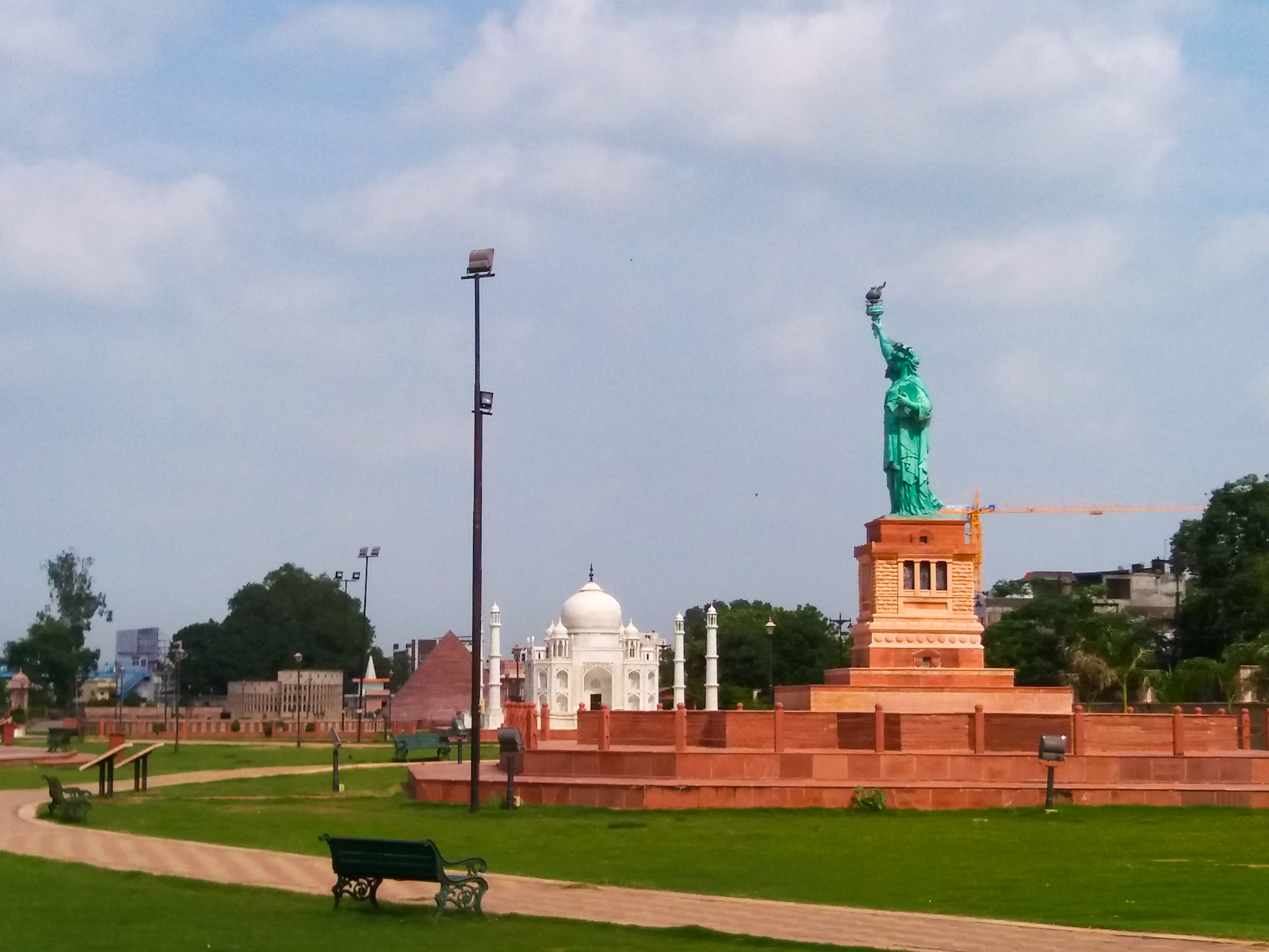
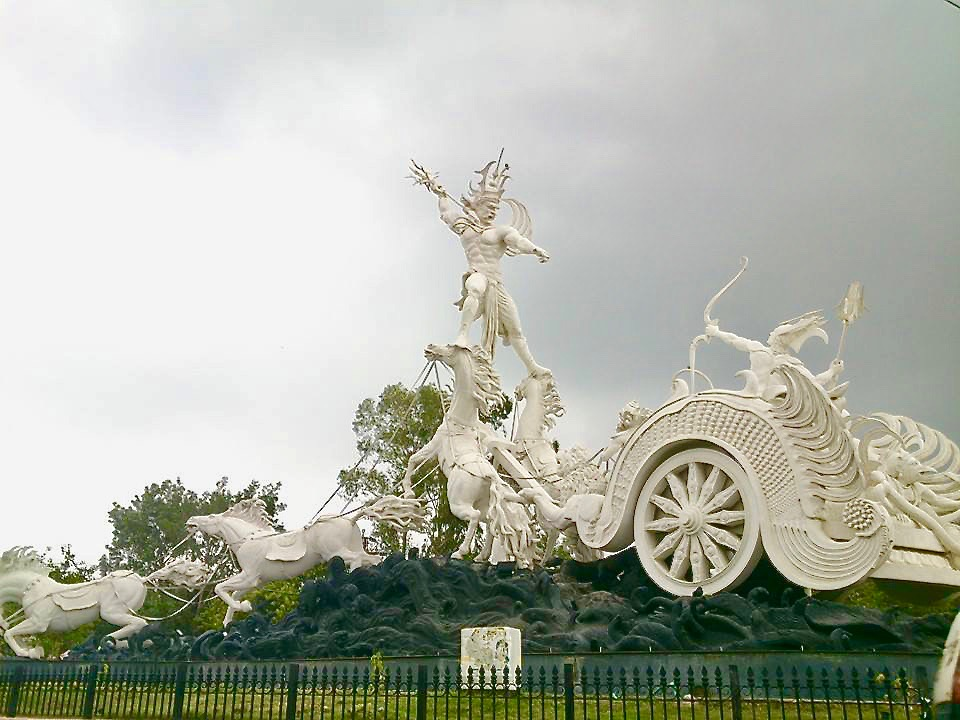
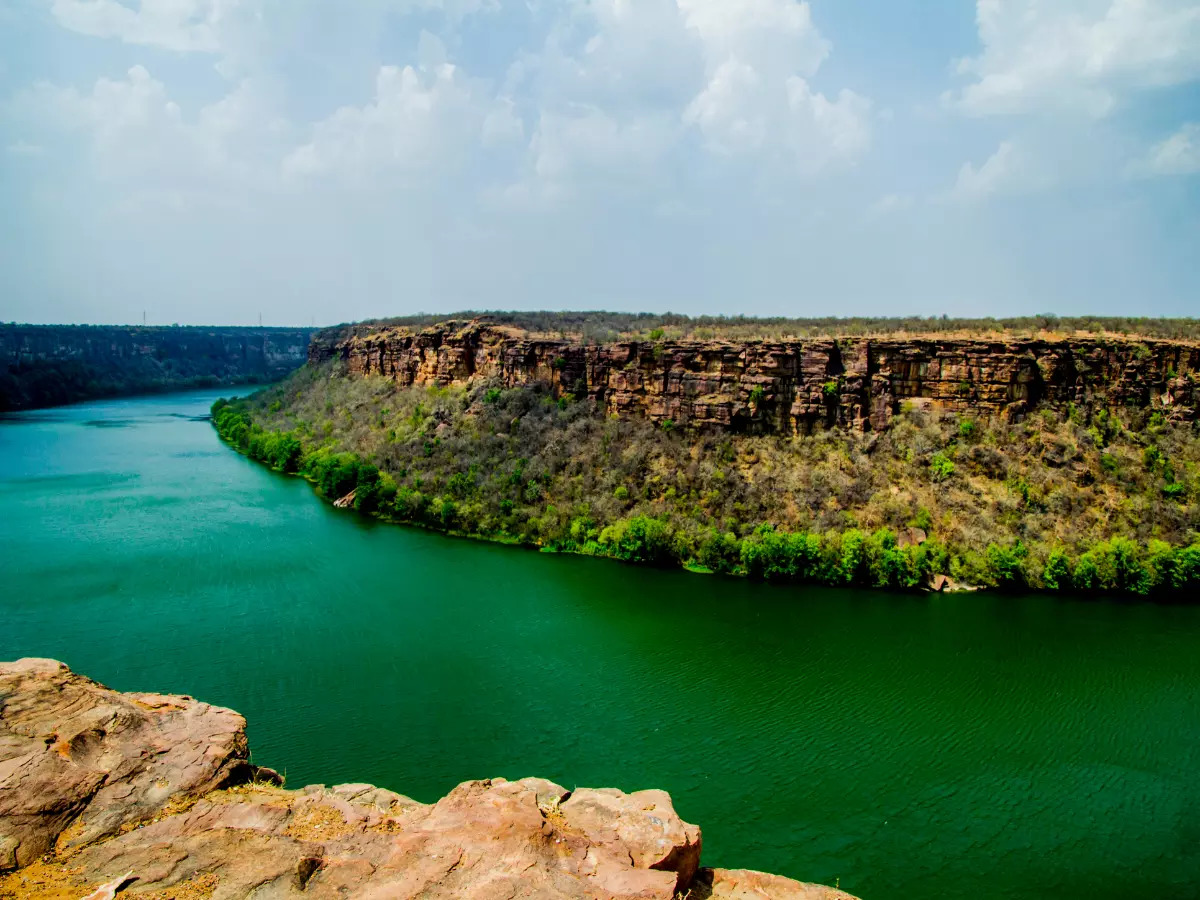
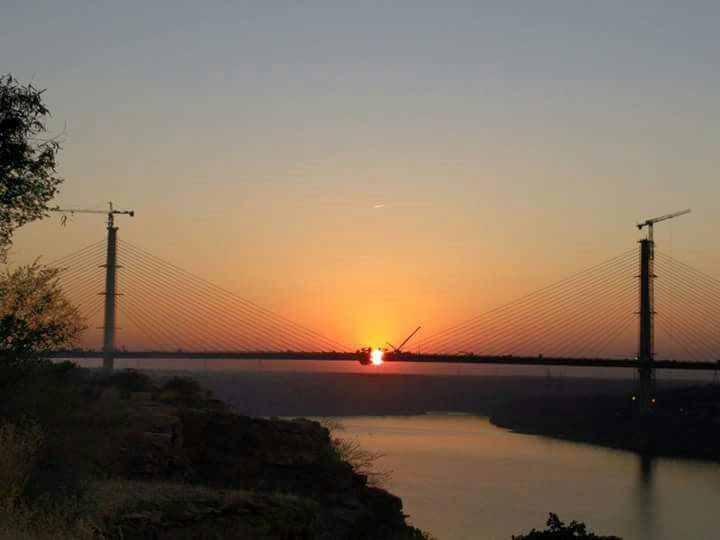
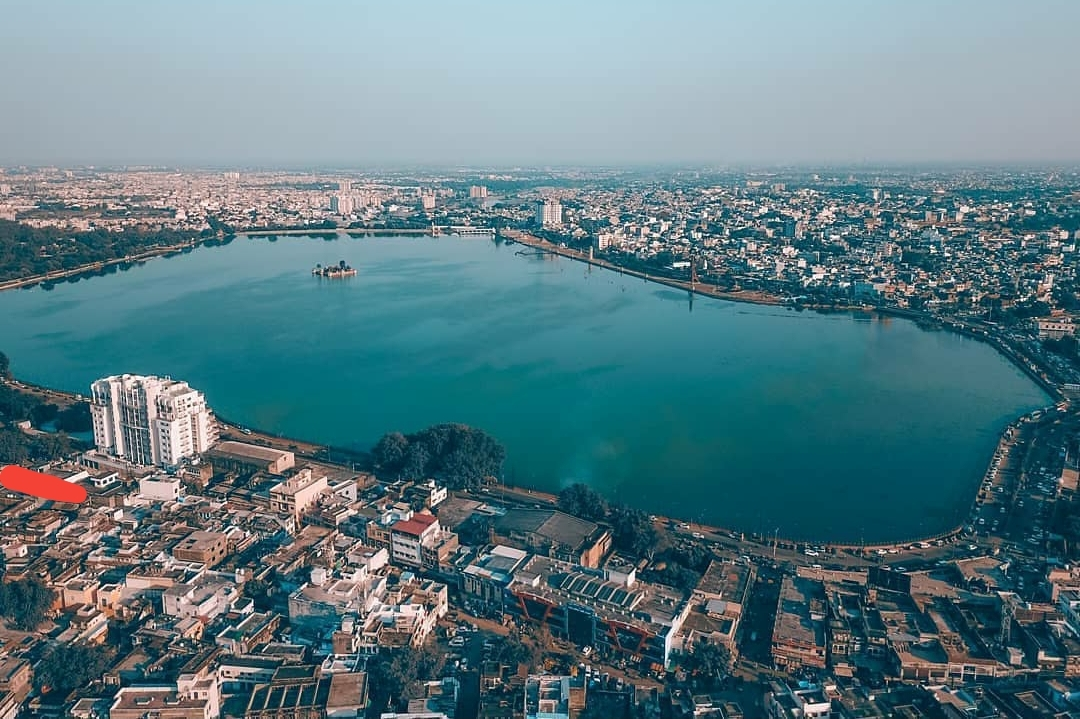
- Jag Mandir Palace Seven Wonders Park Ghatotkacha Circle Chambal river Kota Hanging Bridge Kota City Aerial View
- Nickname: Coaching capital of India
- Location within Rajasthan Location within India
- Coordinates: 25.18°N 75.83°E
- Country: India
- State: Rajasthan
- District: Kota
- Division: Kota Division (Hadoti Region)
- Established: 1631
- Named for: Kotia Bhil

Government
  - Type: Municipal Corporation
  - Body: Kota Municipal Corporation
  - Mayor: Anusuya Goswami (BJP)
  - Municipal Commissioner: Anurag Bhargav, RAS

Area
  - Total: 527 km^{2} (203 sq mi)
- Elevation: 271 m (889 ft)

Population (2011)
  - Total: 1,001,694
  - Rank: 46th
  - Density: 1,900/km^{2} (4,920/sq mi)

Languages
  - Official: Hindi, English
  - Native: Rajasthani, Harauti
- Time zone: UTC+5:30 (IST)
- PIN: 324001 to 324011 and 324022
- Telephone code: 0744
- ISO 3166 code: RJ-IN
- Vehicle registration: RJ-20
- Sex ratio: 895 ♀/♂
- Website: kotamc.org

Kota (Hindi pronunciation: [ko.ʈɐ]), previously known as Kotah, is the third-largest city of the Indian state of Rajasthan. It is located about 230 km (143 mi) south of the state capital, Jaipur, on the banks of the Chambal River. As of 2024, with a population of over 1.5 million, it is the third most populous city in Rajasthan, after Jaipur and Jodhpur. It is also India's first and world's second traffic signal free city after Bhutan's capital Thimphu. It serves as the administrative headquarters for the Kota district and Kota division. It was founded as a walled city in the 14th century in the erstwhile Bundi state and became the capital of the princely state of Kota in 1625, following the separation of the Bundi and the Kota state. Kota is renowned for its coaching institutes for engineering and medical entrance exams, such as JEE and NEET. Each year, over 200,000 students move to Kota to prepare for these competitive exams.

In addition to several monuments, Kota is known for its palaces and gardens. The city was included among 98 Indian cities for the Smart Cities Mission initiated by the Indian Prime Minister Narendra Modi in 2015 and was listed at 67th place after the results of the first round were released. Afterward, the top 20 cities were further selected for funding in the immediate financial year.

== History ==
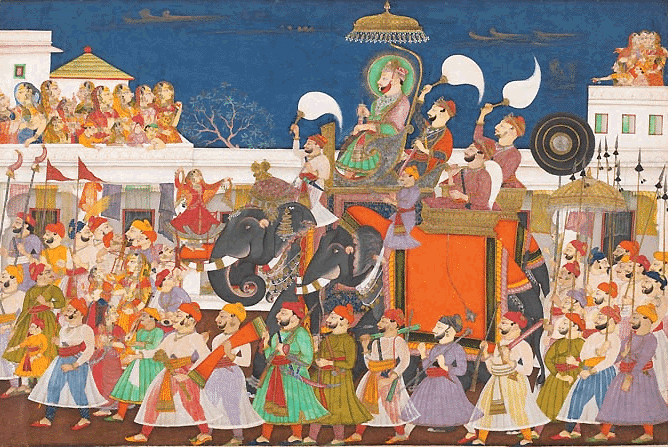
Procession of Raja Ram Singh II of Kota, Later Mughal Period, c. 1850

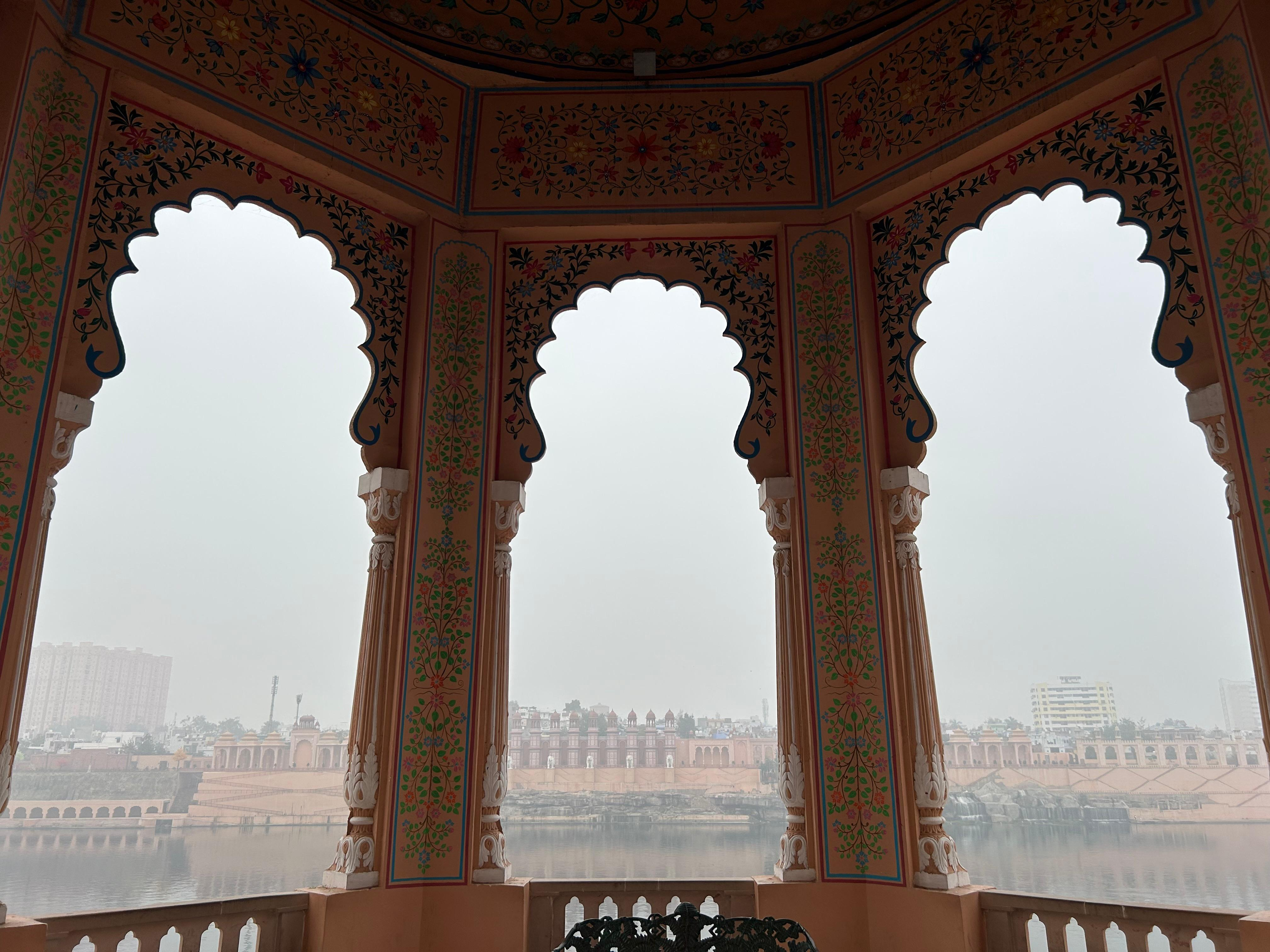
Chambal riverfront

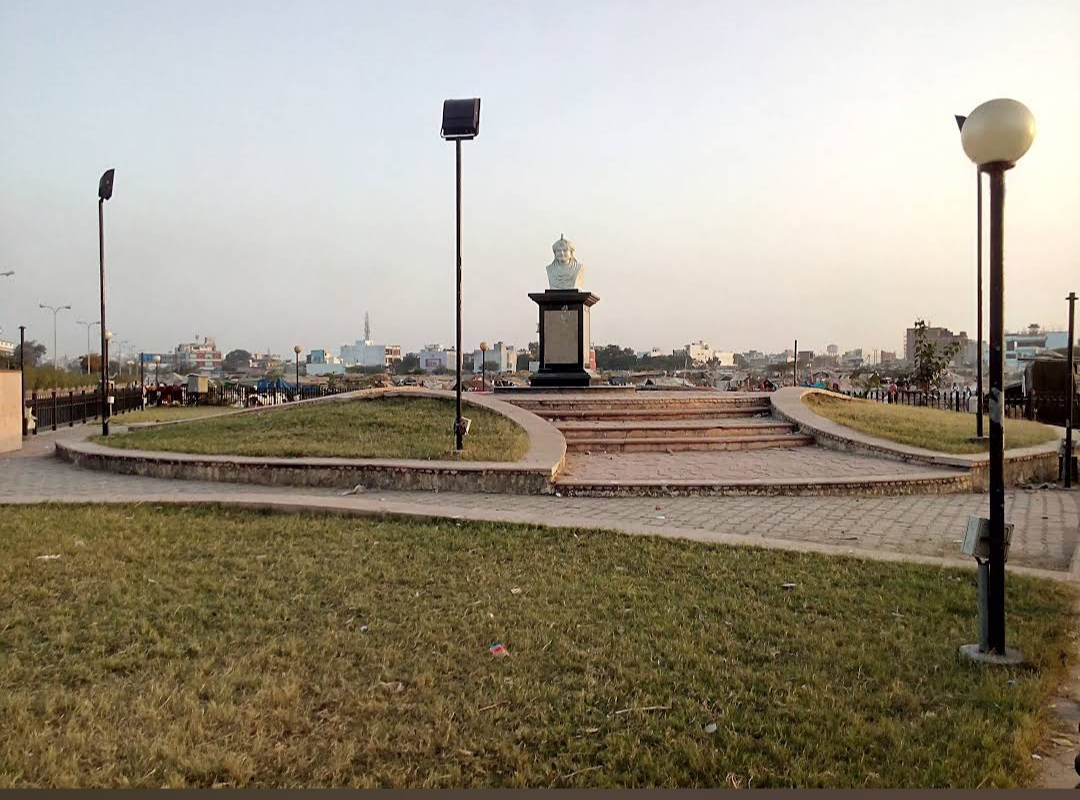
Statue of King Kotia Bhil Smarak

The history of the city dates back to the 12th century CE, when Rao Deva, a Chauhan Rajput chieftain belonging to the Hada clan, conquered the territory and founded Bundi and Hadoti. Later, in the early 17th century, during the reign of the Mughal Emperor Jahangir, the ruler of Bundi – Rao Ratan Singh, gave the smaller principality of Kota to his son, Madho Singh. Since then Kota has been recognized as a hallmark of the Rajput gallantry and culture.

Princely city: Kota (कोटा)
Region	Hadoti
19th-century flag
Independence from:	Bundi State
State existed:	1579–1949
Dynasties	Rajput Chauhan Hada
Capital	Kota

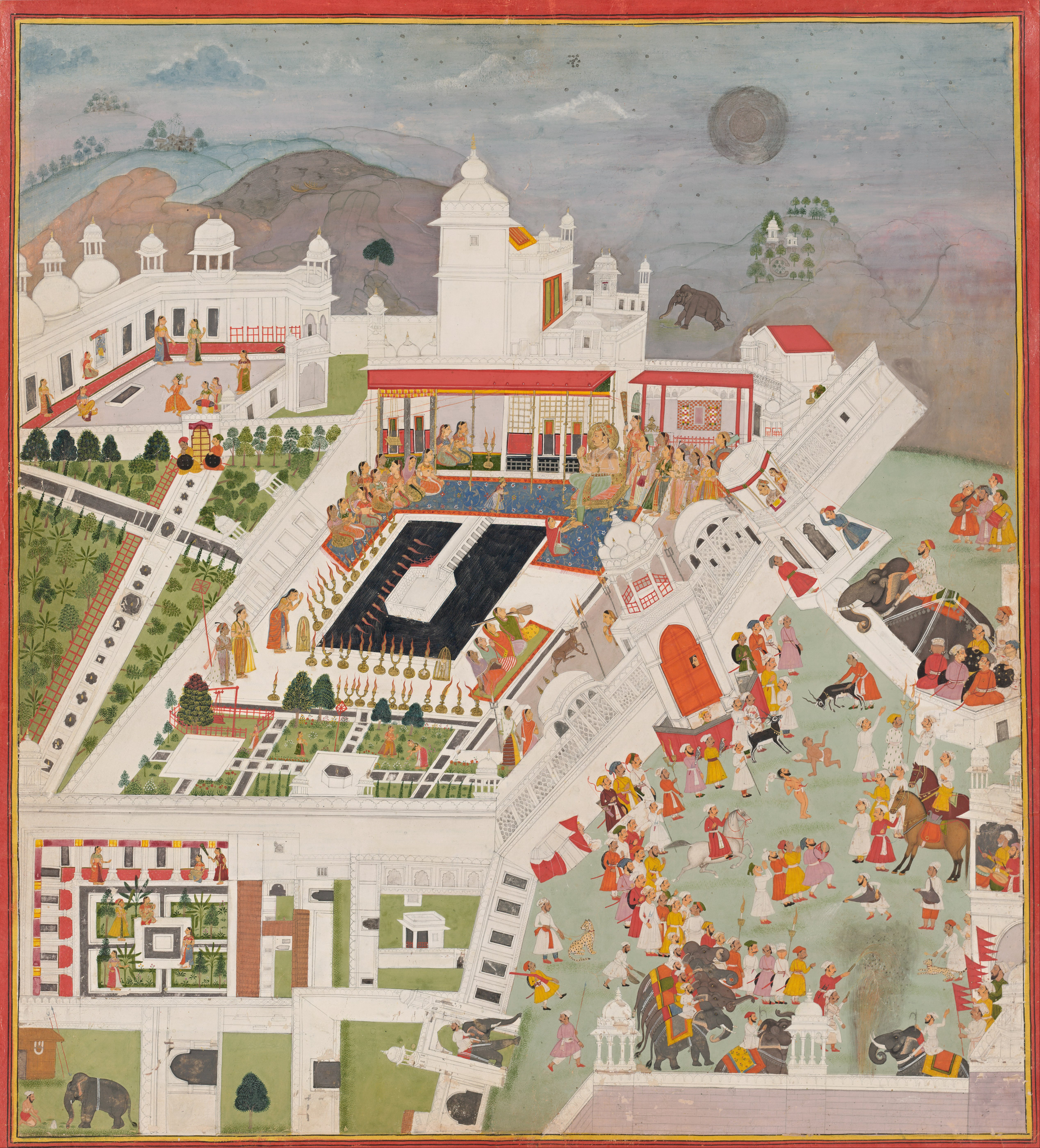
Diwali celebrations at Kota, 1690s

Kota became an independent state in 1631 when Rao Madho Singh, the second son of Rao Ratan of [Bundi], was made the ruler by the Mughal Emperor Jahangir. Soon, Kota outgrew its parent state as it expanded in area, became wealthier in revenue, and more powerful. Maharao Bhim Singh played a pivotal role in Kota's history, having held a 'Mansab' of five thousand and being the first in his dynasty to have the title of Maharao. Zalim Singh, a diplomat and statesman, emerged as another prominent figure of the state in the 18th century. Although initially being a general of Kota's army, he rose to the regent of the kingdom after the king died, leaving a minor on the throne. He remained a direct administrator of the state. In 1817, a treaty of friendship was signed between him and the British on the condition of carving out part of the existing state for his descendants, resulting in the formation of Jhalawar State in 1838. Kota was not involved in the earlier events of the Indian Rebellion of 1857. However, when in October 1857, rebels murdered the local British resident and his two sons, British forces responded by storming the city and, after some resistance, capturing it in March 1858.

In the 1940s, social activist Guru Radha Kishan organised trade union activities and campaigned against the colonial government. He left Kota after the local administration learned of the arrest warrant issued against him for his participation in Indian Independence activities.

== Geography ==
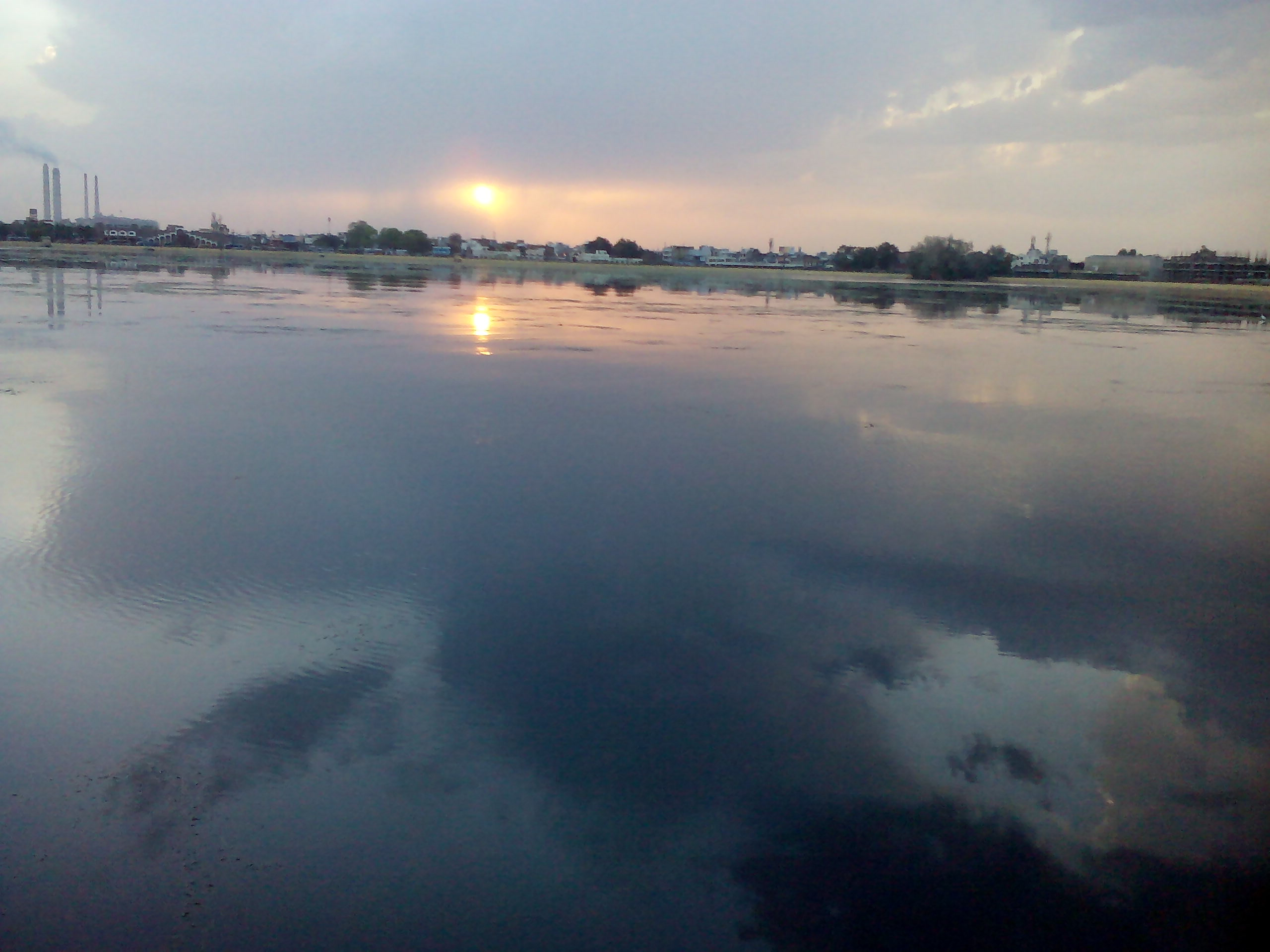
Kishore Sagar Lake

Kota is situated along the banks of the Chambal River in the southern part of Rajasthan. It is the third-largest city of Rajasthan after Jaipur and Jodhpur. The cartographic coordinates are 25.18°N 75.83°E. It covers an area of 221.36 km^{2} (85.47 sq mi). It has an average elevation of 271 metres (889 ft). The district is bound on the north and northwest by Sawai Madhopur, Tonk, and Bundi districts. The Chambal River separates these districts from the Kota district, forming the natural boundary.

The city of Kota is situated at the centre of the southeastern region of Rajasthan, a region very widely known as Hadoti, the land of the Hadas. Kota lies along the banks of the Chambal river on a high sloping tableland forming a part of the Malwa Plateau. The general slope of the city is towards the north. The comparatively rocky, barren, and elevated land in the southern part of the city descends towards a plain agricultural land in the north. The Mukundara hills run from the southeast to the northwest axis of the town.

Kota has fertile land and greenery with irrigation facilities through canals. The two main canals, referred to as the left main canal (towards Bundi) and the right main canal (towards Baran), originate from the reservoir created by Kota Barrage. The tributaries of these canals form a network in the city and surrounding areas of Rajasthan and Madhya Pradesh, and supplements the irrigation of these areas.

=== Climate ===
Kota

Climate chart (precipitation, max. and min. temperature)
J	F	M	A	M	J	J	A	S	O	N	D
10 23 11	20 26 13	10 33 19	10 39 25	20 42 29	50 40 29	250 34 26	240 32 26	110 34 25	20 34 22	10 30 16	10 25 12
- █ Average max. and min. temperatures in °C
- █ Precipitation totals in mm
- Source: Kota weather
Imperial conversion
J	F	M	A	M	J	J	A	S	O	N	D
0.4 74 51	0.8 79 55	0.4 91 65	0.4 101 77	0.8 108 85	2 103 83	9.8 92 79	9.4 89 79	4.3 94 77	0.8 93 72	0.4 85 60	0.4 77 54
- █ Average max. and min. temperatures in °F
- █ Precipitation totals in inches

Kota has a semi-arid climate (Köppen climate classification BSh), bordering on a Monsoon-influenced humid subtropical climate (Köppen: Cwa), with high temperatures throughout the year. Summers are long, hot, and dry, starting in late March and lasting till the end of June. The temperatures average above 40 °C in May and June, frequently exceed 45 °C, with temperatures as high as 48.5 °C have also been recorded. The monsoon season follows with comparatively lower temperatures, but higher humidity and frequent, torrential downpours. The monsoons subside in October and temperatures rise again. The brief, mild winter starts in late November and lasts until the last week of February. Temperatures hover between 26.7 °C (max) to 12.0 °C (min). This can be considered the best time to visit Kota because of the intense heat in the summer.

The average annual rainfall in the Kota district is 800.6 mm. Most of the rainfall can be attributed to the southwest monsoon, which usually begins around the last week of June and may last till mid-September. Pre-monsoon showers usually occur around the middle of June, with post-monsoon rains occasionally occurring in October. The winter is largely dry, although some rainfall does occur as a result of the Western Disturbance passing over the region.

Climate data for Kota Airport (1991–2020, extremes 1961–2020)
Month	Jan	Feb	Mar	Apr	May	Jun	Jul	Aug	Sep	Oct	Nov	Dec	Year
Record high °C (°F)	33.9 (93.0)	38.3 (100.9)	42.8 (109.0)	47.5 (117.5)	48.5 (119.3)	47.8 (118.0)	47.2 (117.0)	42.0 (107.6)	41.0 (105.8)	41.1 (106.0)	38.0 (100.4)	33.9 (93.0)	48.5 (119.3)
Mean daily maximum °C (°F)	23.2 (73.8)	27.1 (80.8)	33.3 (91.9)	39.3 (102.7)	42.6 (108.7)	40.3 (104.5)	34.3 (93.7)	32.2 (90.0)	33.9 (93.0)	34.6 (94.3)	30.1 (86.2)	25.7 (78.3)	33.1 (91.6)
Daily mean °C (°F)	17.3 (63.1)	20.8 (69.4)	26.6 (79.9)	32.6 (90.7)	36.3 (97.3)	34.7 (94.5)	30.5 (86.9)	29.0 (84.2)	29.6 (85.3)	28.5 (83.3)	23.7 (74.7)	18.7 (65.7)	27.4 (81.3)
Mean daily minimum °C (°F)	11.2 (52.2)	14.3 (57.7)	19.8 (67.6)	25.7 (78.3)	30.0 (86.0)	29.5 (85.1)	27.0 (80.6)	25.8 (78.4)	25.5 (77.9)	22.3 (72.1)	16.9 (62.4)	12.6 (54.7)	21.8 (71.2)
Record low °C (°F)	1.7 (35.1)	2.2 (36.0)	8.6 (47.5)	14.0 (57.2)	17.5 (63.5)	18.8 (65.8)	16.4 (61.5)	18.0 (64.4)	16.4 (61.5)	13.0 (55.4)	7.1 (44.8)	2.6 (36.7)	1.7 (35.1)
Average rainfall mm (inches)	5.7 (0.22)	8.2 (0.32)	2.7 (0.11)	8.4 (0.33)	9.7 (0.38)	80.3 (3.16)	296.7 (11.68)	269.6 (10.61)	108.7 (4.28)	18.9 (0.74)	3.8 (0.15)	3.6 (0.14)	816.2 (32.13)
Average rainy days	0.7	0.7	0.6	0.8	1.0	4.7	11.6	11.2	5.8	0.9	0.4	0.3	38.6
Average relative humidity (%) (at 17:30 IST)	40	30	19	13	15	33	62	69	54	31	31	37	36
Source 1: India Meteorological Department
Source 2: Tokyo Climate Center (mean temperatures 1991–2020)

Kota has been ranked 38th best “National Clean Air City” (under Category 1 >10L Population cities) in India.

== Demographics ==
Religion in Kota City (2011)
Religion	Percent
Hinduism	80.50%
Islam	15.87%
Jainism	2.17%
Sikhism	0.86%
Christianity	0.42%
Other or not stated	0.18%
Distribution of religions

According to the 2011 census of India, Kota City had a population of 1,001,694, of which male and female are 528,601 and 473,093 respectively. The provisional results of the 2011 census reported the city's population as 1,001,365. The urban agglomeration of Kota consists of the city only. The sex ratio was 895, and 12.14% were under six years of age. The effective literacy rate was 82.80%, with male literacy at 89.49% and female literacy at 75.33%.

According to the 2011 census, Hinduism is the majority religion in the city, practiced by about 80.5% of the population. Muslims form a significant minority (15.9%), followed by Jains (2.2%), Sikhs (0.9%), and Christians (0.4%).

Languages of Kota (2011)
1. Hindi (55.6%)
2. Hadoti (29.4%)
3. Rajasthani (4.38%)
4. Urdu (3.12%)
5. Sindhi (2.16%)
6. Malvi (1.13%)
7. Others (4.24%)

Harauti, a dialect of Rajasthani, is widely spoken in Kota, alongside Hindi, Marwari, and English, being the other languages spoken.

== Government institutions and courts ==
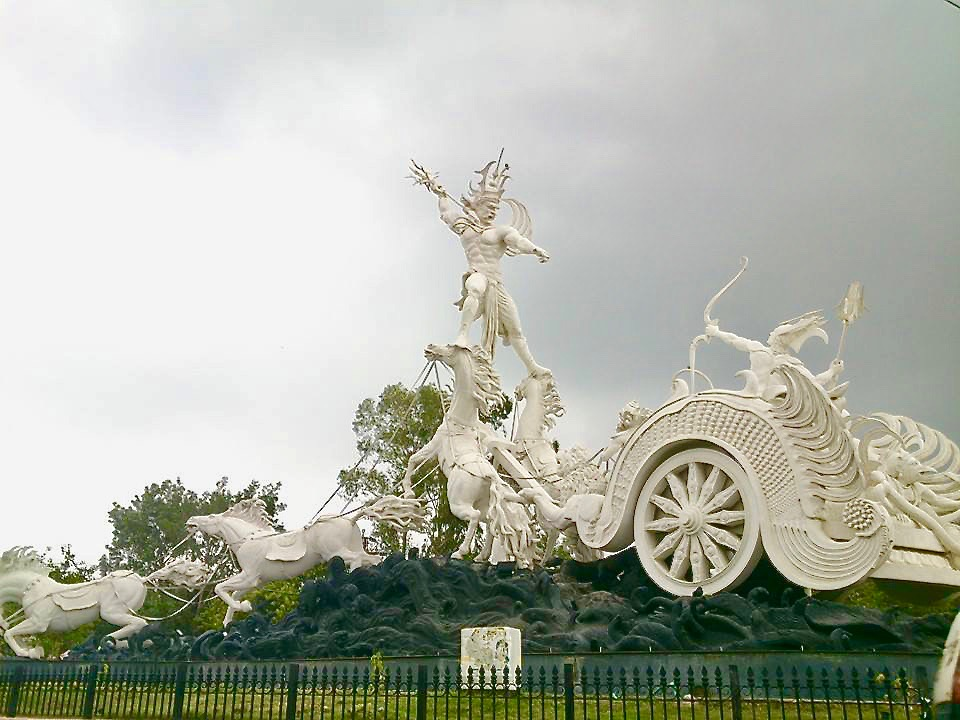
Karna Ghatotkacha fight sculpture in Kota

Governmental institutions in Kota include:

- Municipal Corporation (North-South)
- Collectorate
- Office of the Divisional Commissioner
- Rajasthan Housing Board
- Command Area Development (CAD)
- Urban Improvement Trust (UIT) Now (KDA) Kota Development Authority
- Office of the Superintendent of Police, Inspector General of Police, and the Income Tax commissioner of the Kota range.
- Office of the Divisional Railway Manager, Kota Division, West Central Railway
- Office of the Deputy Commissioner of central excise and service tax

Instrumentation Ltd is a Public Sector company based in Kota. Its clientele includes public sector entities such as the Indian Railways, BSNL, and VSNL. Presently, it has been shut down.

The District court provides court and notary services.

== Economy ==
The city is the trade centre for an area in which cotton, millet, wheat, coriander, and oilseeds are grown; industries include cotton and oilseed milling, textile weaving, distilling, dairying, and the manufacture of metal handicrafts. Kota also has an extensive industry of stone-polishing (tiles) of a stone called Kota Stone, used for the floor and walls of residential and business buildings. Over the last 15 years, Kota has emerged as an Education hub of the country as producing excellent results in IIT-JEE and medical entrance exams.

=== Kota educational industry ===
Kota is recognised as a major center for competitive test preparation, attracting around 150,000 students each year, as reported in 2023. These students come from across the country to enroll in coaching institutes that prepare them for national entrance exams for engineering and medical colleges. The industry generates an estimated $350–$450 million annually, with over 300 coaching centers, including the Allen Career Institute, which tutors more than one million students nationwide.

The coaching industry in Kota originated in the 1980s when Vinod Kumar Bansal, a mechanical engineer, began tutoring students after being diagnosed with a degenerative condition that confined him to a wheelchair. His methods, inspired by the Kumon method of learning, emphasized systematic problem solving. Bansal's success in helping students gain admission to prestigious institutions like the Indian Institutes of Technology (IIT) drew more students to the city. Over time, other coaching centers were established by former colleagues and associates, eventually transforming Kota into an educational hub. The city currently has multiple engineering, medical, law, commerce, arts, and sciences colleges.

=== Kota Doria or Kota Doriya and Sarees ===
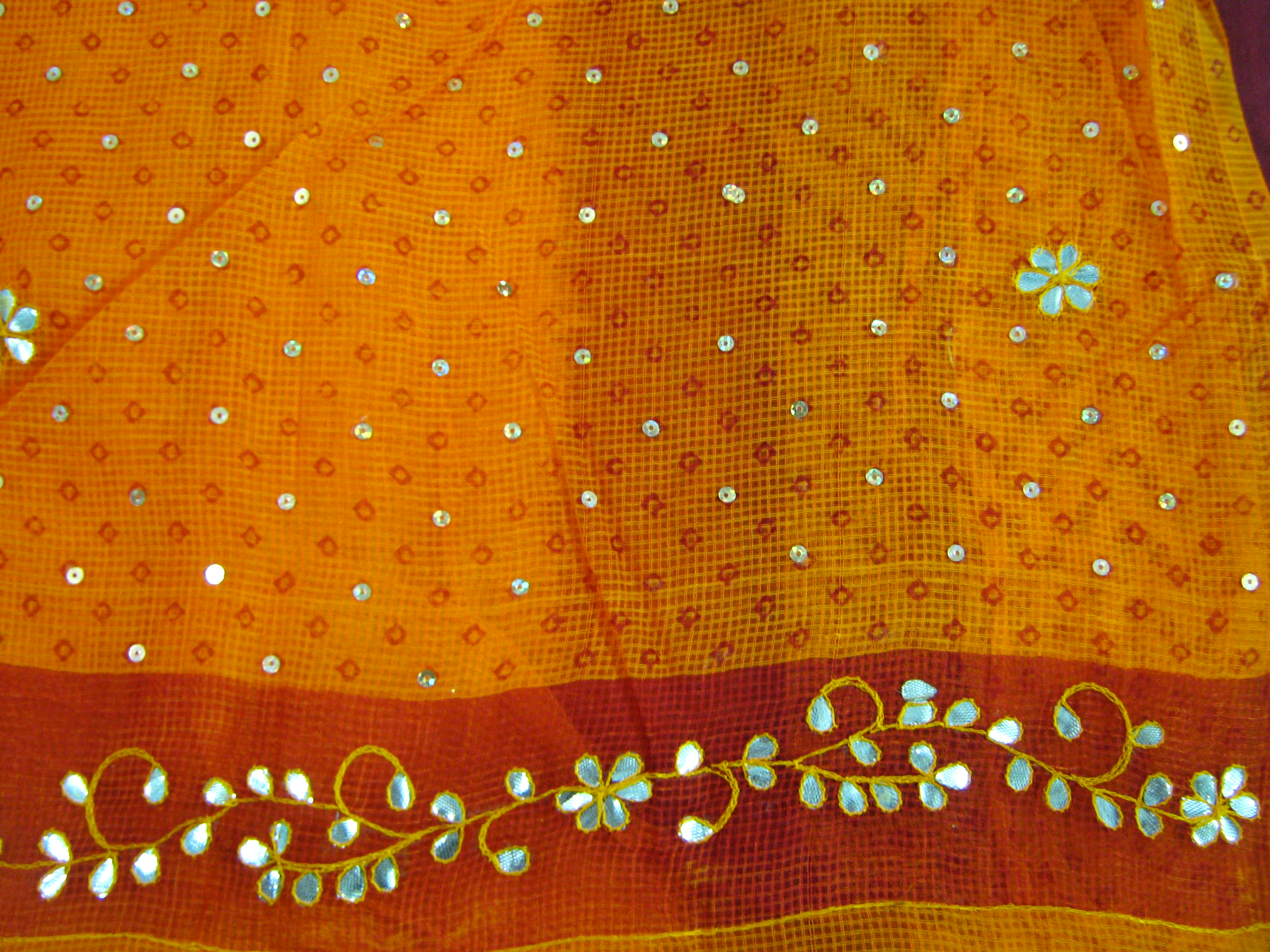
Kota Sari with Gota Patti embroidery

Weaving in Kota was started by Maharana Bhimdev in the 18th century.

The Kota saris, like most traditional pieces of work, had started becoming lost before designer Vidhi Singhania moved to Kota and started working with the workers to revive its market. Many textile shops in the city sell different varieties of Kota doriya. These saris have become one of the trademarks of the city.

=== Kota stone ===
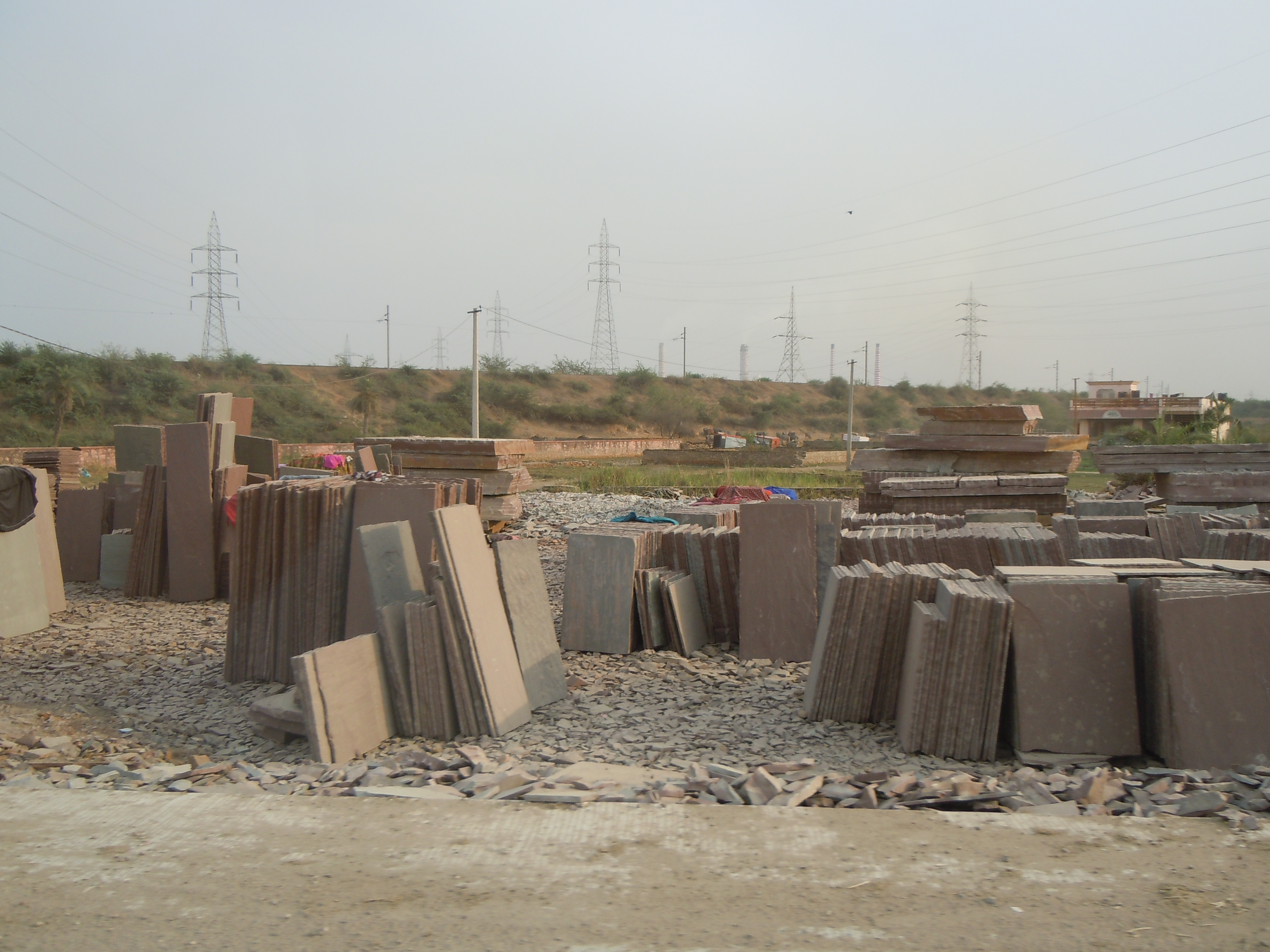
Storage area of Kota Stone

The fine-grained variety of limestone quarried from the Kota district is known as Kota stone, with rich greenish-blue and brown colours. Kota stone is tough, non-water-absorbent, non-slip, and non-porous. The varieties include Kota Blue Natural, Kota Blue Honed, Kota Blue Polished, Kota Blue Cobbles, Kota Brown Natural, and Kota Brown Polished.

=== Industries ===
Kota is one of the industrial hubs in northern India, with chemical, cement, engineering, and power plants based there. The total number of industrial units in the district in 2010–11 stood at 12908, with 705 registered units. The district power plants show annual growth of 15–20% due to their strategic locations.

==== Power plants ====
Kota is surrounded by five power stations within its 50 km radius.

1. Kota Super Thermal Power Plant – thermal
2. Rajasthan Atomic Power Station in Rawatbhata Chittorgarh district (65 kilometres from Kota) – nuclear
3. NTPC Anta Gas Power Plant in Antah Baran district (50 kilometers from Kota) – gas
4. Jawahar Sagar Power Plant – hydro
5. Kalisindh Thermal Power Station (in Jhalrapatan, Jhalawar) – thermal
6. Surya Chambal Power Plant in Rangpur Kota district - biomass

== Education ==
=== Coaching Institutes ===
The city is especially known in India as a centre for the preparation of various national-level competitive examinations through which the students seek admissions in various engineering and medical colleges of the country. Often termed as the "Kota Factory", the town contains more than 40 large coaching institutes for aspiring students trying to pass entrance exams for Indian Institutes of Technology (IIT), through the IIT-JEE, and prominent medical colleges such as the All India Institutes of Medical Sciences (AIIMS) of India, using NEET-UG.

Since 2000, the city has emerged as a popular coaching destination for preparing for competitive exams as well as for-profit educational services. The education sector of Kota has become one of the major contributors to the city's economy. Kota is popularly referred to as "the coaching capital of India". Over 150,000 students from all over the country flock every year towards the city for preparation of various exams such as IIT-JEE and NEET-UG etc. Many hostels and PGs are located in Kota near the vicinity of coaching centres for students. Students live here for 2–3 years and prepare for the exams. The annual turnover of the Kota coaching industry is about ₹1500 crore. The majority of the students here are enrolled in schools, providing the facility of "dummy schooling", which gives students admission without the need to attend it regularly. However, it is an illegal practice. In 2019, The Viral Fever launched a Web Series called Kota Factory to depict the lives of students who study at Kota.

Kota's emergence as a coaching hub began in 1985 when Vinod Kumar Bansal, an engineer, established Bansal Classes that eventually became Bansal Classes Private Limited.

In 2024, Kota has also witnessed a significant decline in the number of students enrolling from 2-2.5 lakh students to just 85000-1 lakh students and revenue from ₹6,500-7,000 crore to ₹3,500 crore which is a decline by 50%, owing to the significant rise in student suicides and stricter rules implemented for coaching institutes by the Rajasthan Government and the Ministry of Education.

=== Colleges ===
- Government Medical College, Kota
- University Engineering College, Kota

=== Universities ===
- Agriculture University, Kota
- Indian Institute of Information Technology, Kota
- Rajasthan Technical University
- University of Kota
- Vardhaman Mahaveer Open University

== Places of interest ==
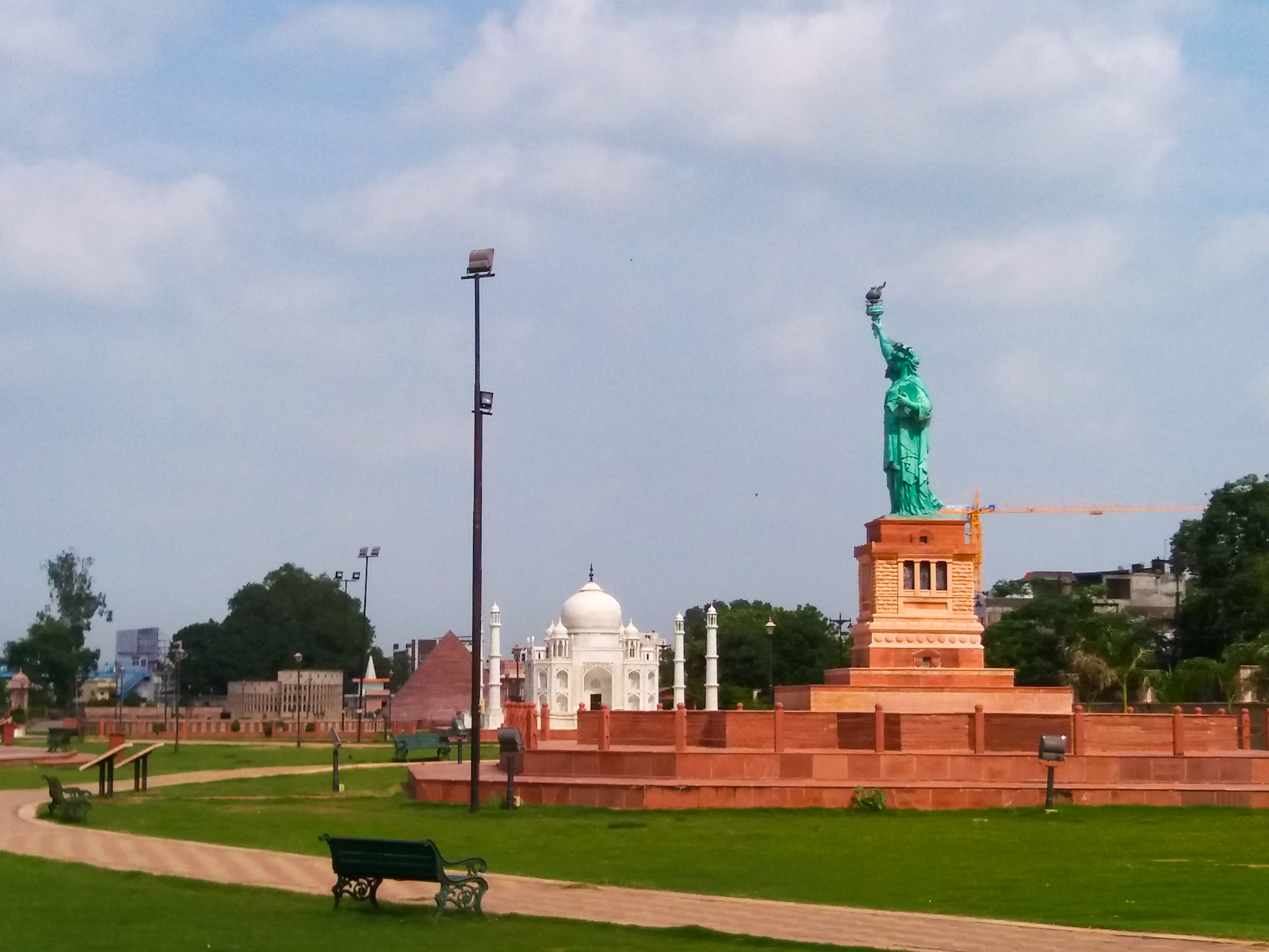
Seven Wonders Park

Some of the popular visitor attractions in and nearby the city include Chambal Riverfront, City Park Chambal Garden, Seven Wonders Park, Kishore Sagar Lake, Jag Mandir Palace, Garh Palace, Umed Bhawan Palace, Chatra Vilas Garden, Ganesh Udyan, Traffic Garden, Godavari Dham Temple, Geparnath Mahadev Temple, Garadia Mahadev Temple, Chattaneshwar Mandir, Kota Zoological Park, Abheda Biological Park, City Park(IL Oxizone), Chatrapati Shivaji Park, Maharao Madho Singh Museum, Kota Government Museum, Brijraj Bhawan Palace, Abheda Mahal, Royal Cenotaphs at Kshar Bagh, Kota Barrage, Khade Ganesh Ji Mandir, Shiv Puri Dham, Maa Trikuta Mandir, Kansua Shiv Mandir, Darrah National Park and Jawahar Sagar Dam.

== Transport ==
Kota is well connected by road and rail to all major cities within Rajasthan as well as those located outside the state.

=== Roadways ===
Kota has two major interstate bus terminals, namely, Nayapura Bus Stand at Nayapura and Roadways New Bus Stand at Ramchandrapura. National Highway No.27 (via Udaipur, Kanpur, Gorakhpur, Siliguri, Bongaigaon,Guwahati) and National highway No.52 (via Hisar, Churu, Sikar, Jaipur, Indore, Aurangabad, Solapur, and Hubli) pass through the Kota City. National Highway No.27 is a part of East-West Corridor (Porbandar - Silchar) and National Highway No.52 connects Punjab to Karnataka (Sangrur, Punjab—Ankola, Karnataka). The total road length in Kota district is 2,052 km as of March 2011. There are also three upcoming expressway projects in the form of Delhi–Mumbai Expressway (Via Kota, Rajasthan, and Vadodara), Kota–Hyderabad Expressway (Via Indore) and Chambal Expressway.

=== Railways ===
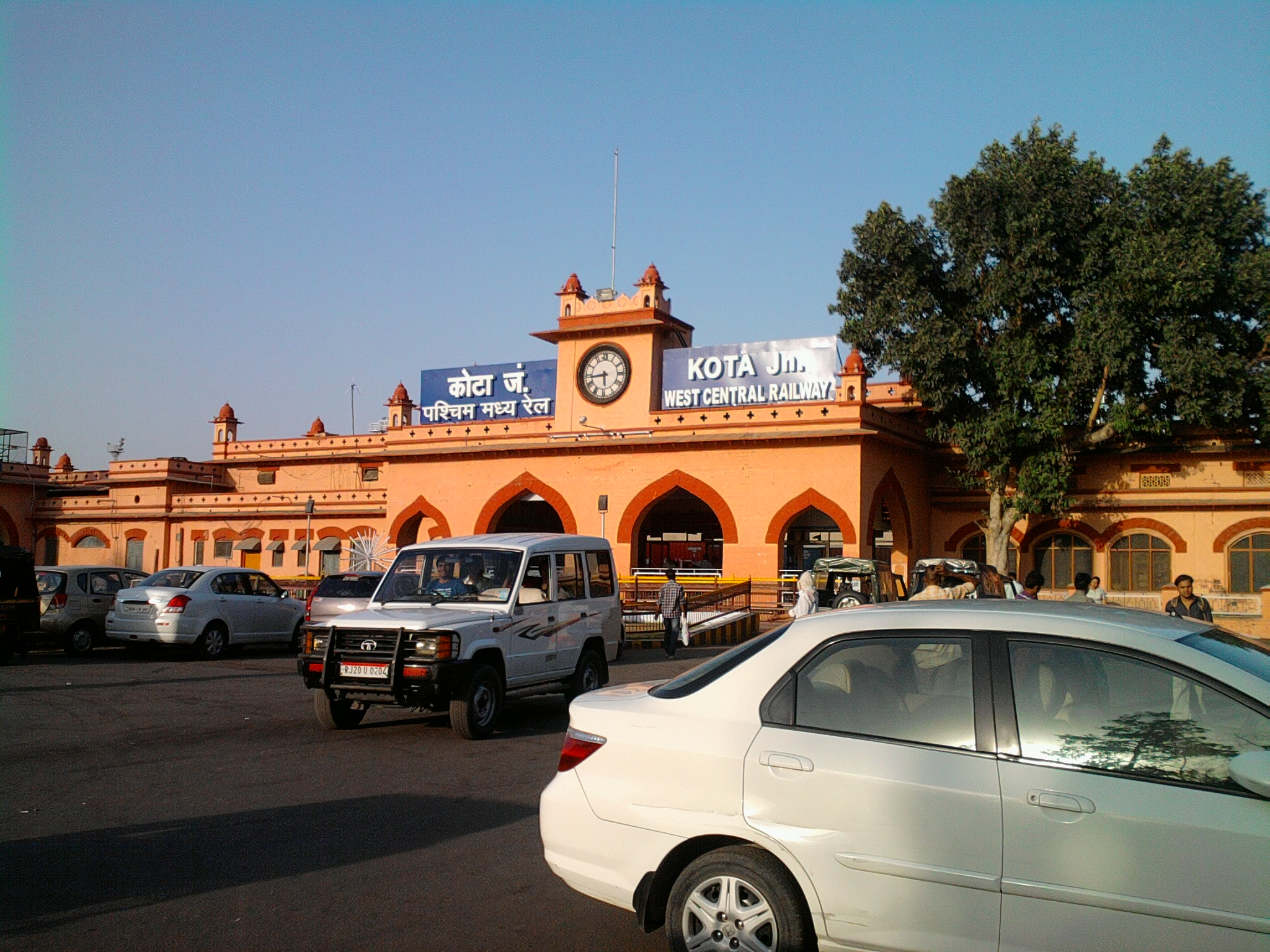
Entrance of Kota Railway station

Kota is well connected to all the major cities of India with rail. Kota Junction is one of the divisions in West Central Railway. It is a station on the New Delhi–Mumbai main line. There are four railway stations within Kota and in its vicinity. One Substation of East Kota City is Sogariya(Kota Bypass) Railway Station and Another suburban station of South Kota city is Dakaniya Talav railway station which has a stoppage of Avadh Express, Dehradun Express and Ranthambore Express. Major railway stations in Kota are currently undergoing redevelopment under the Amrit Bharat Station Scheme, an infrastructure initiative by the Government of India.

The city is a halt for over 182 trains, including Mumbai Rajdhani Express, August Kranti Rajdhani Express, Thiruvananthapuram Rajdhani Express, Madgaon Rajdhani Express, Mumbai New Delhi Duronto Express, Golden Temple Mail, Paschim Express, Bandra Terminus-Hazrat Nizamuddin Garib Rath Express, Kevadiya–Hazrat Nizamuddin Gujarat Sampark Kranti Express, Gujarat Sampark Kranti Express, Maharashtra Sampark Kranti Express, Goa Sampark Kranti Express, Kerala Sampark Kranti Express, Indore–Jaipur Express, Gangaur SuperFast Express, Mewar Express, Dayodaya Express, Jodhpur – Indore Intercity, Hazrat Nizamuddin - Indore Express, Garbha Express, Marusagar Express (Ajmer – Ernakulam Express / Ernakulam Express), Jaipur–Mysore Superfast Express, Swaraj Express, Chennai Central–Jaipur Superfast Express, Coimbatore–Jaipur Superfast Express, Jodhpur – Puri Express, Bandra Terminus–Gorakhpur Avadh Express, Bandra Terminus–Muzaffarpur Avadh Express, Jodhpur – Bhopal Express, Guwahti - Okha Dwarka Express, Kamakhya - Gandhidham Express.

The Delhi—Mumbai railway line passes through the Kota Junction. The district has 148.83 km of railway line in the Kota – Ruthia section, 98.72 km on Nagda—Mathura (Mumbai-Delhi) section and 24.26 km on Kota —Chittorgarh section.

A broad-gauge railway facility between Kota and Jodhpur via Jaipur exists.

=== Airways ===
Kota Airport is a civil airport serving Kota, Rajasthan, India. Spread over 447 acres, Kota Airport was originally built by the royal family of the princely state of Kota and was taken over by the government in 1951. This Airport Also Known As Rajputana Airport. Originally serviced by Indian Airlines Dakota aircraft and later by Vayudoot and Jagson Airlines, shutdown of major industries and Kota becoming a major railway junction effected decreased demand for air transport and the withdrawal of the airlines. Kota Airport has had no scheduled services operating since 1999. The nearest international airport is Jaipur International Airport situated around 240 km away from Kota.

The development of Kota greenfield airport has been approved 15 kilometres outside of the city.

== Sports ==
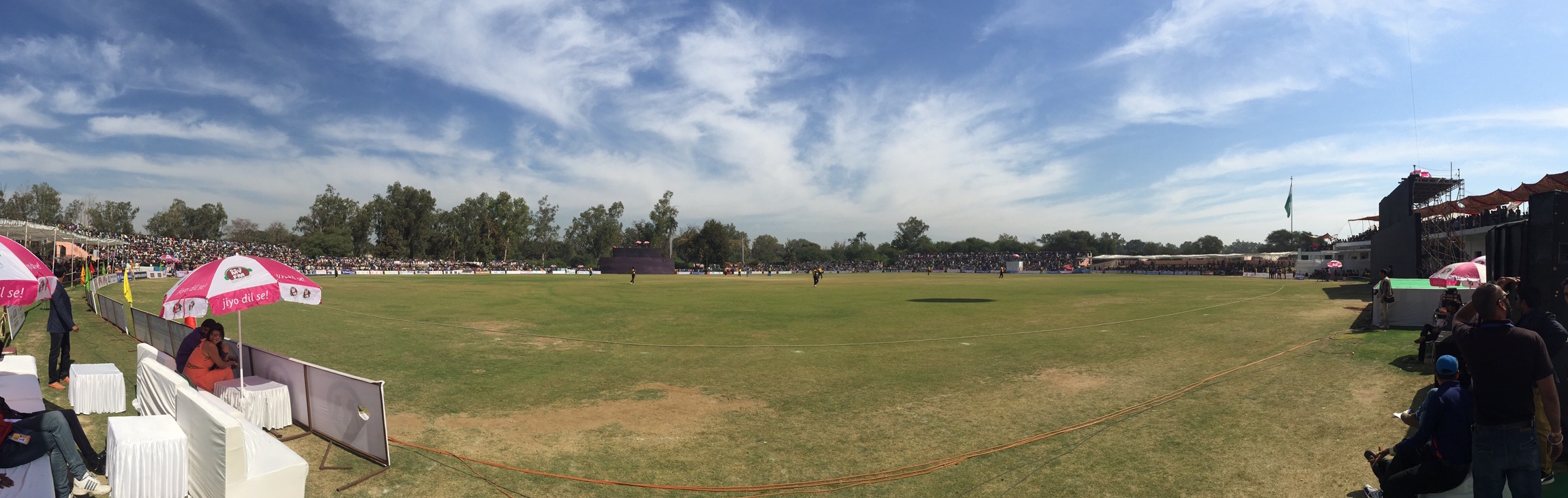
Jay Kaylon Cricket Stadium

The city is home to Jay Kaylon Cricket Stadium located in Nayapura area. Among several matches, six Ranji Trophy matches have been played in the stadium. The stadium also hosted RCL T20 2016, an inter state cricket league with six participating teams.The University of Kota Sports Board lists facilities for indoor and outdoor sports, including basketball, badminton, judo, wrestling, gymnastics, squash, kabaddi, football, hockey, cricket, table tennis, and athletics.

== Media ==
=== Television ===
There are five major regional TV Channels in Kota.

- DD Rajasthan
- Media House Rajasthan(MHR News)
- ETV Rajasthan
- India news Rajasthan
- Jan TV

A wide range of other Hindi, English, and other language channels are accessible via cable subscription and direct-broadcast satellite services. Dish TV, Tata Sky, Radiant Digitek, Airtel digital TV are entertainment services in Kota.

=== Newspapers ===
Major daily newspapers in Kota include:

- Rajasthan Patrika (Hindi)
- Dainik Bhaskar (Hindi)
- Dainik Navajyoti (Hindi)
- Chambal Sandesh (Hindi)

=== Radio ===
There are five radio stations in Kota, with four broadcasting on the FM band, and one All India Radio station broadcasting on the AM band.

- All India Radio (102.0 MHz)
- Big FM (92.7 MHz)
- My FM (94.3 MHz)
- FM Tadka (95.0 MHz)
- Radio City (91.1 MHz)

== Notable people ==
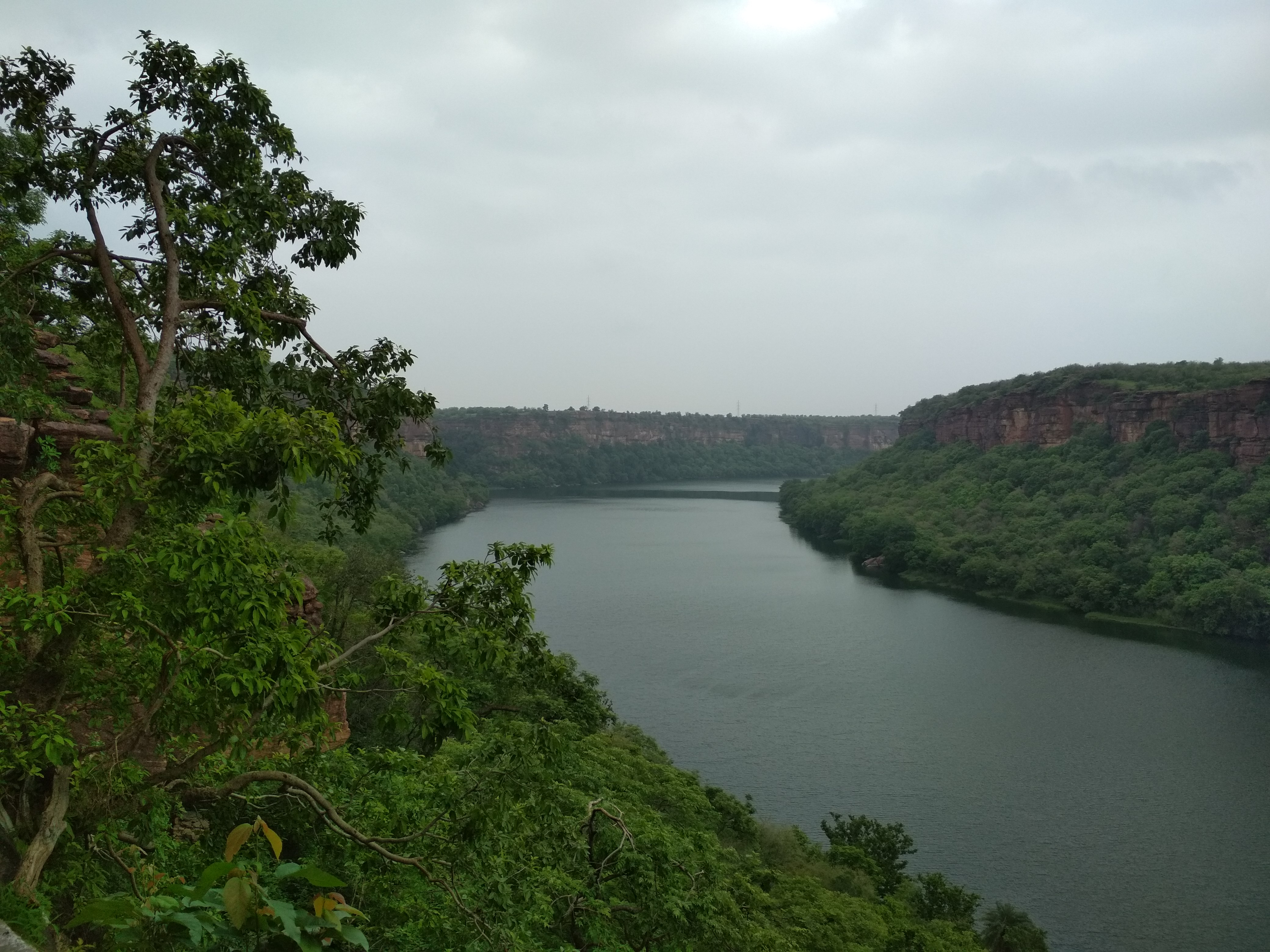
Chambal River, as seen in Kota at Garadiya Mahadev

- Ajay Ahuja
- Aniruddh Singh
- Bhim Singh II
- Bhupendra Jadawat
- Bhuvaneshwari Kumari
- Bhuvnesh Chaturvedi
- Brijraj Singh
- Dau Dayal Joshi
- Hari Kumar Audichya
- Ijyaraj Singh
- Krishana Kumar Goyal
- Lalit Kishore Chaturvedi
- Nandini Gupta
- Nikita Lalwani
- Om Birla
- Onkarlal Berwa
- Pramod Maheshwari
- Raghuveer Singh Koshal
- Shail Hada
- Shanti Kumar Dhariwal
- Shiv Kumari of Kotah
- Taj Haider
- Umed Singh II
- Vinod Kumar Bansal
