= Seven Wonders Park =

Park in Kota, India

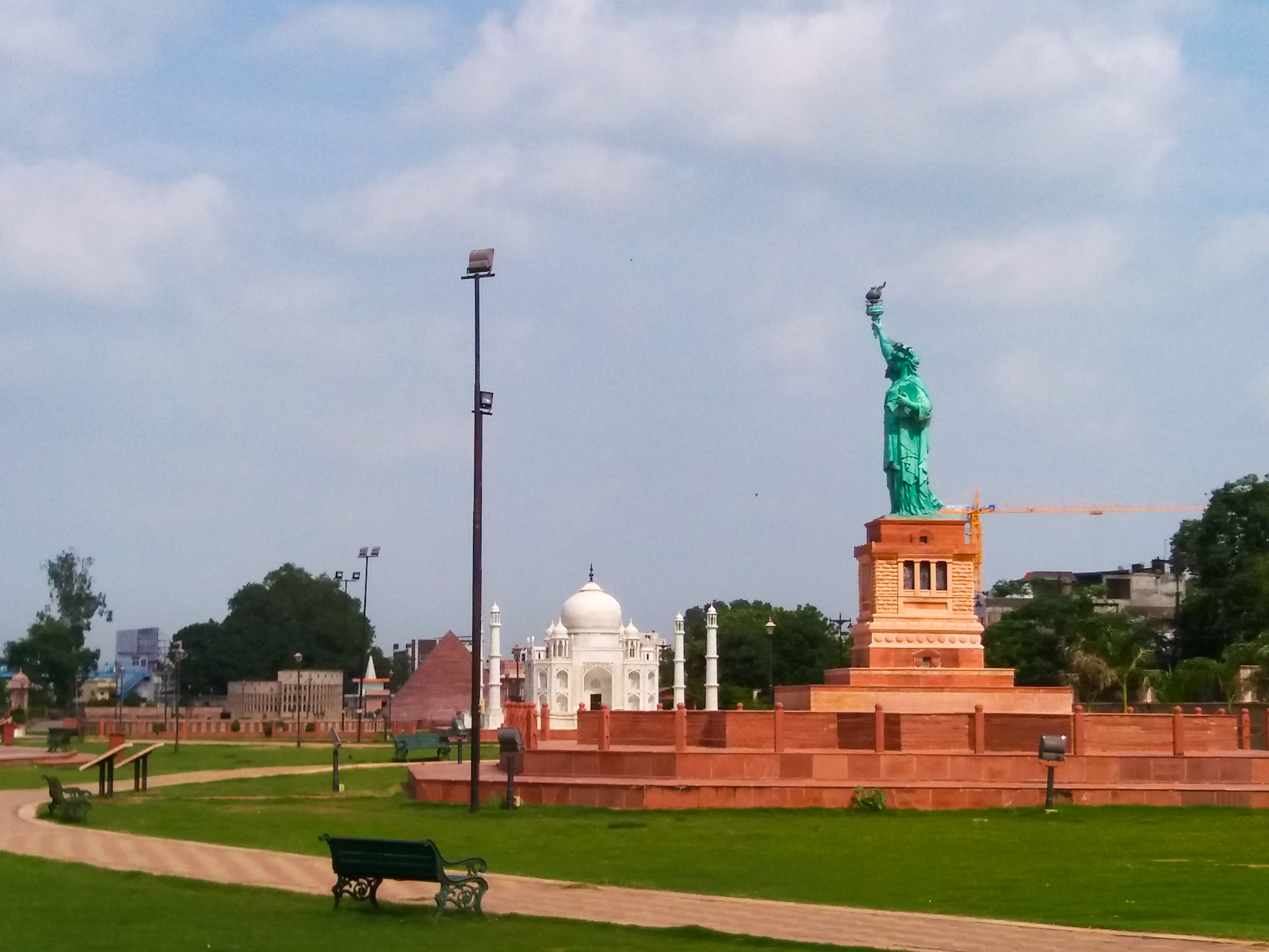
- A view of Seven wonders Park at Kota

- Location within Rajasthan
- Type: Public park
- Location: Kota, Rajasthan, India
- Coordinates: 25.1792°N 75.8516°E
- Area: 7 acres (2.8 ha)
- Created: Urban Improvement Trust, Kota
- Opened: 8 December 2013
- Operator: Kota Municipal Corporation
- Status: Opened

Seven Wonders Park is a tourist destination located in the city of Kota, Rajasthan, India. The park has replicas of the "new seven wonders of the world," making it a destination for both locals and tourists.

== History ==
The idea of Seven Wonders Park was conceived by the Urban Improvement Trust of Kota as part of an initiative to boost tourism and provide a recreational space in the city. The park was officially inaugurated on 8 December 2013, by the then Rajasthan Urban Development and Housing Minister Shanti Dhariwal. The project was executed under the supervision of the Kota Municipal Corporation and aimed to offer visitors a glimpse of world-famous monuments in a single location.

== Design and construction ==
The park was designed by architect Anoop Bartaria. The construction involved extensive research to ensure that the replicas closely resembled the original monuments. Traditional stone artisans were brought in from across Rajasthan, including Bharatpur, Dholpur and Agra, to build the replicas and over 150 workers worked at a fast pace for over a year and a half to complete the project. It cost an estimated ₹20 crore (US$2.1 million) to build. The park is spread over an area of about seven acres and includes landscaped gardens, water bodies and walking paths.

== Features ==
Seven Wonders Park features scaled-down replicas of the following seven wonders of the world:

=== The Great Pyramid of Giza (Egypt) ===
The only surviving structure of the original Seven Wonders of the Ancient World. This replica is made of stone and is high enough to give visitors a view of it.

=== Christ the Redeemer (Brazil) ===
This replica captures the statue of Jesus Christ with outstretched arms located in Rio de Janeiro. It is made from reinforced concrete and stands on a pedestal similar to the original.

=== Eiffel Tower (France) ===
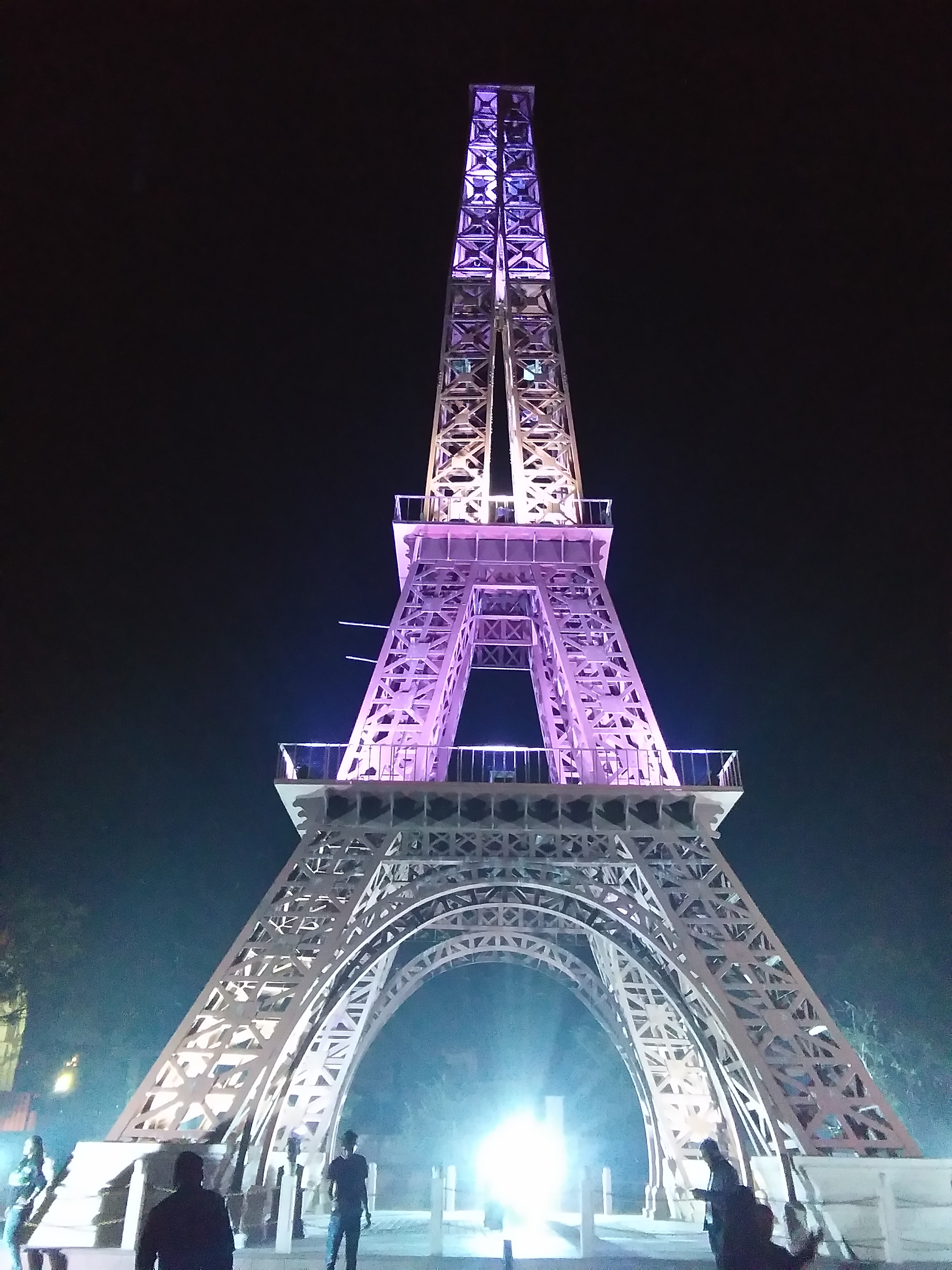
A night view of replica of Eiffel tower at park

A scaled-down version of the famous Parisian landmark, constructed using iron, much like the original. The replica is illuminated at night, offering a bright view.

=== Leaning Tower of Pisa (Italy) ===
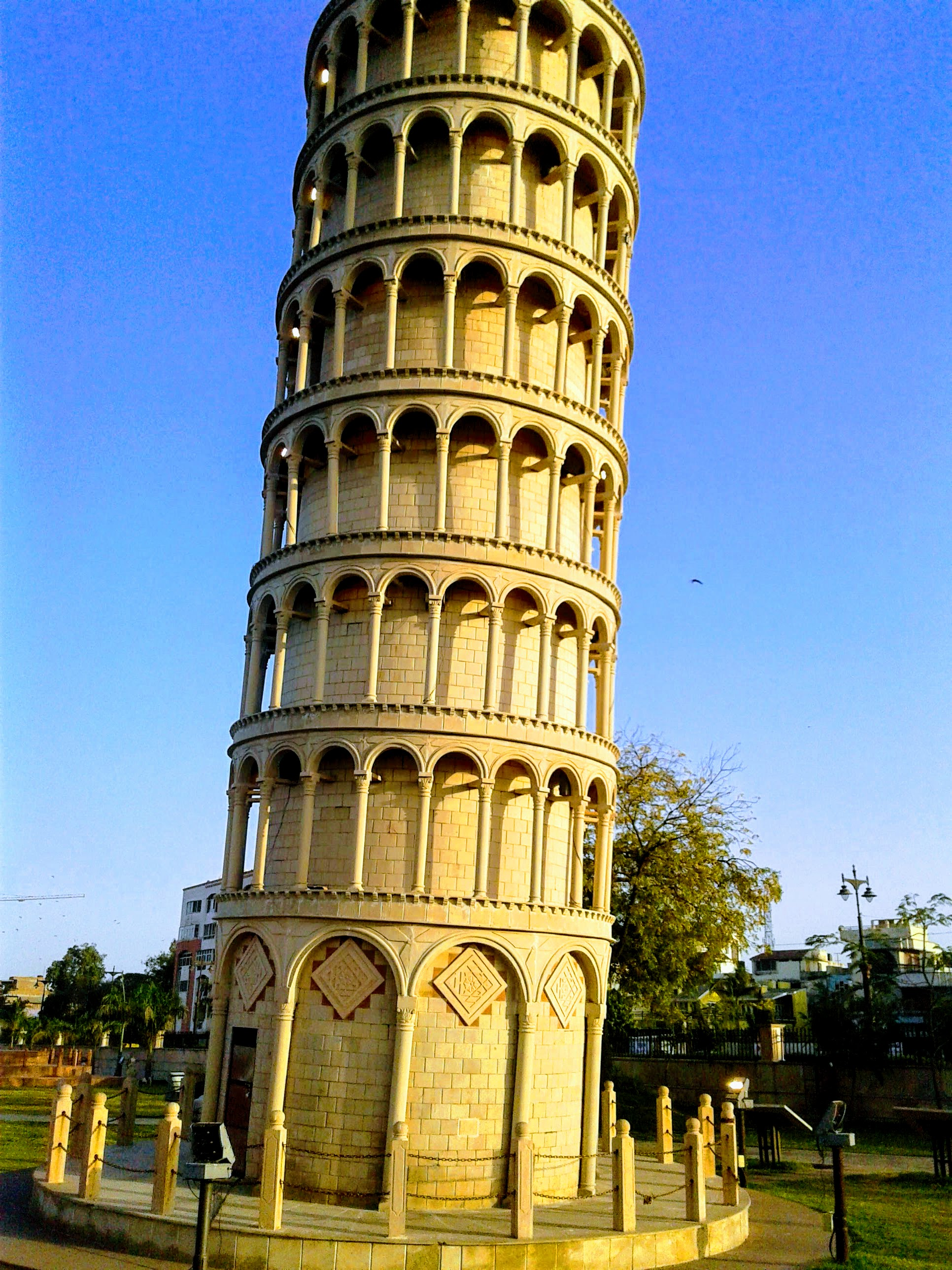
A view of replica of Leaning Tower of Pisa at park

Known for its unintended tilt, this replica is crafted to mimic the structural lean, complete with the cylindrical shape and detailed masonry work.

=== Statue of Liberty (USA) ===
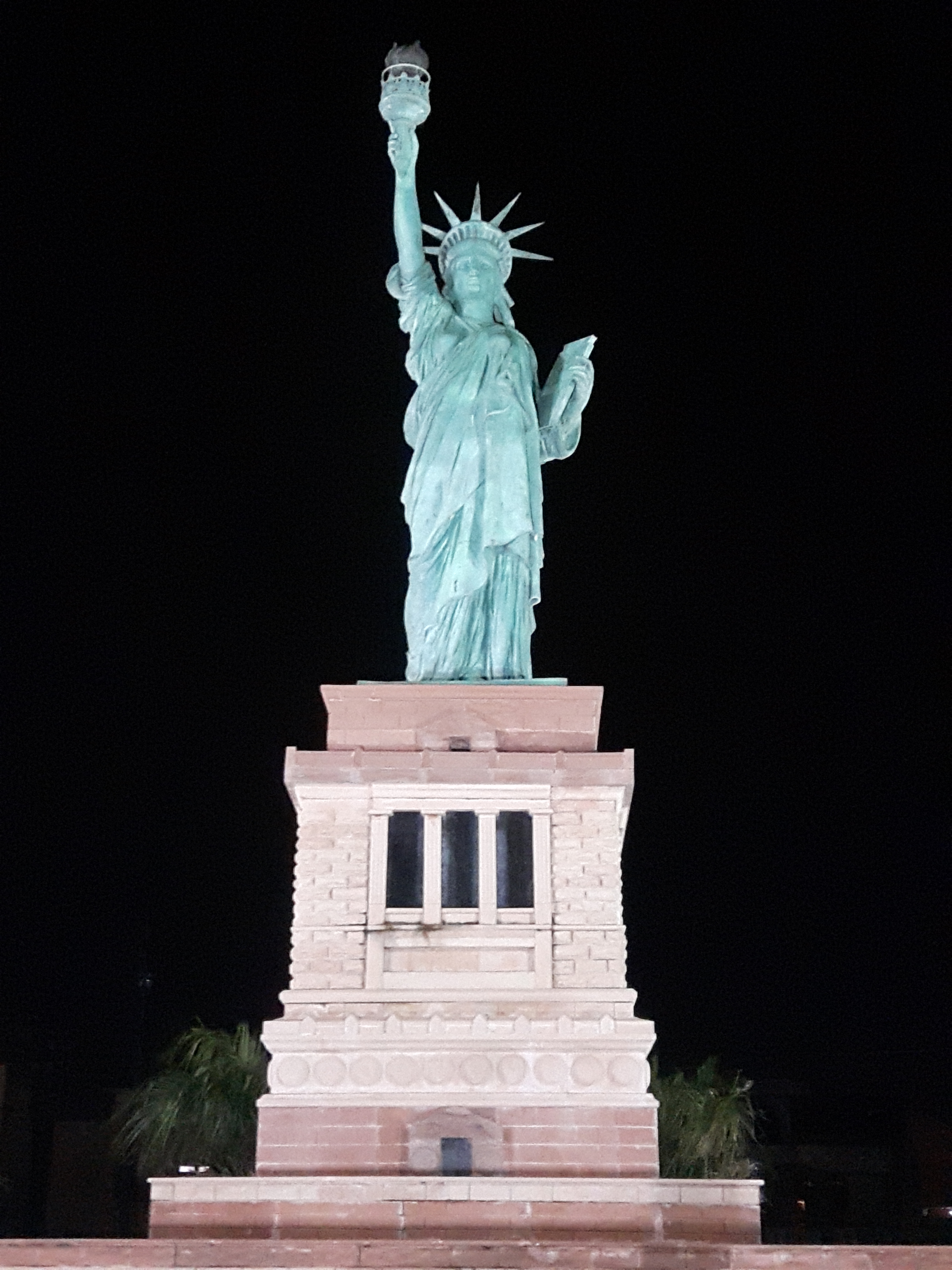
A view of replica of Statue of Liberty at park

This statue replica is made from fiber-reinforced plastic and stands on a pedestal, a replica of the monument located on Liberty Island in New York Harbor.

=== Taj Mahal (India) ===
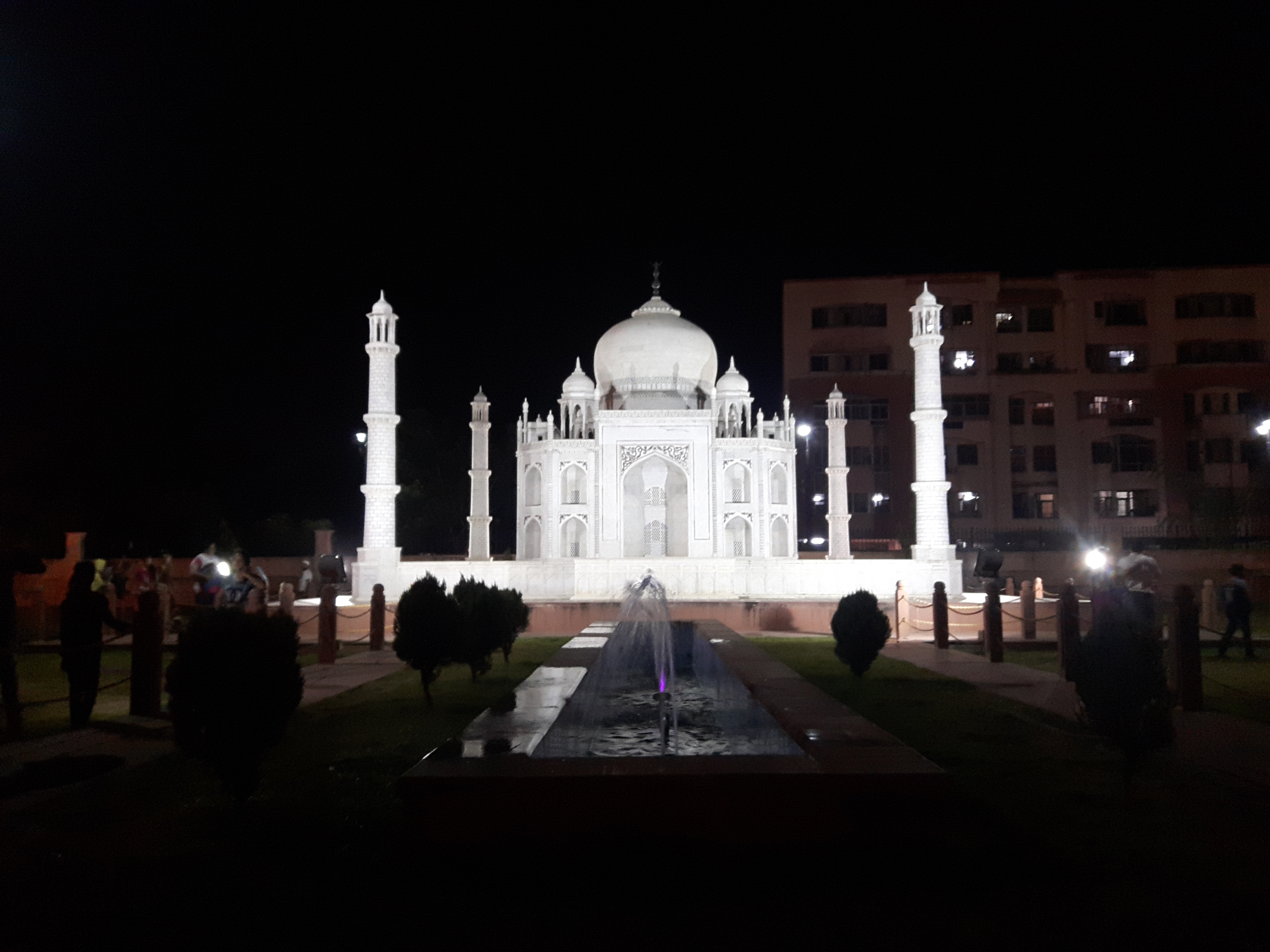
A view of replica of Tajmahal at park

This replica of the Taj Mahal in Agra offers a glimpse of Mughal architecture and is made of white marble.

=== Colosseum (Italy) ===
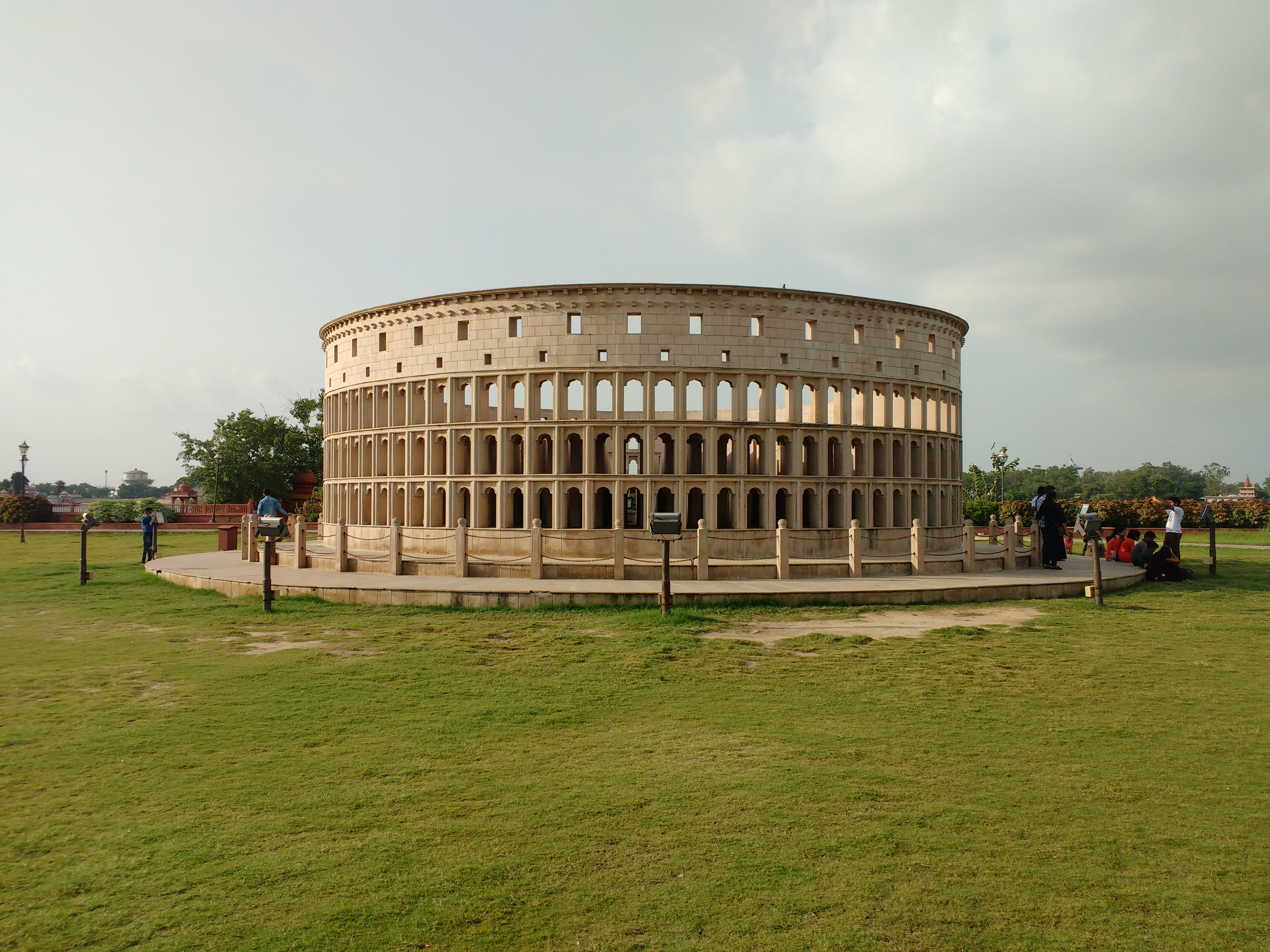
A view of replica of Colosseum at park

This replica of the ancient amphitheater in Rome is constructed using concrete and stone, showcasing the iconic arches and elliptical shape.

== Reception ==
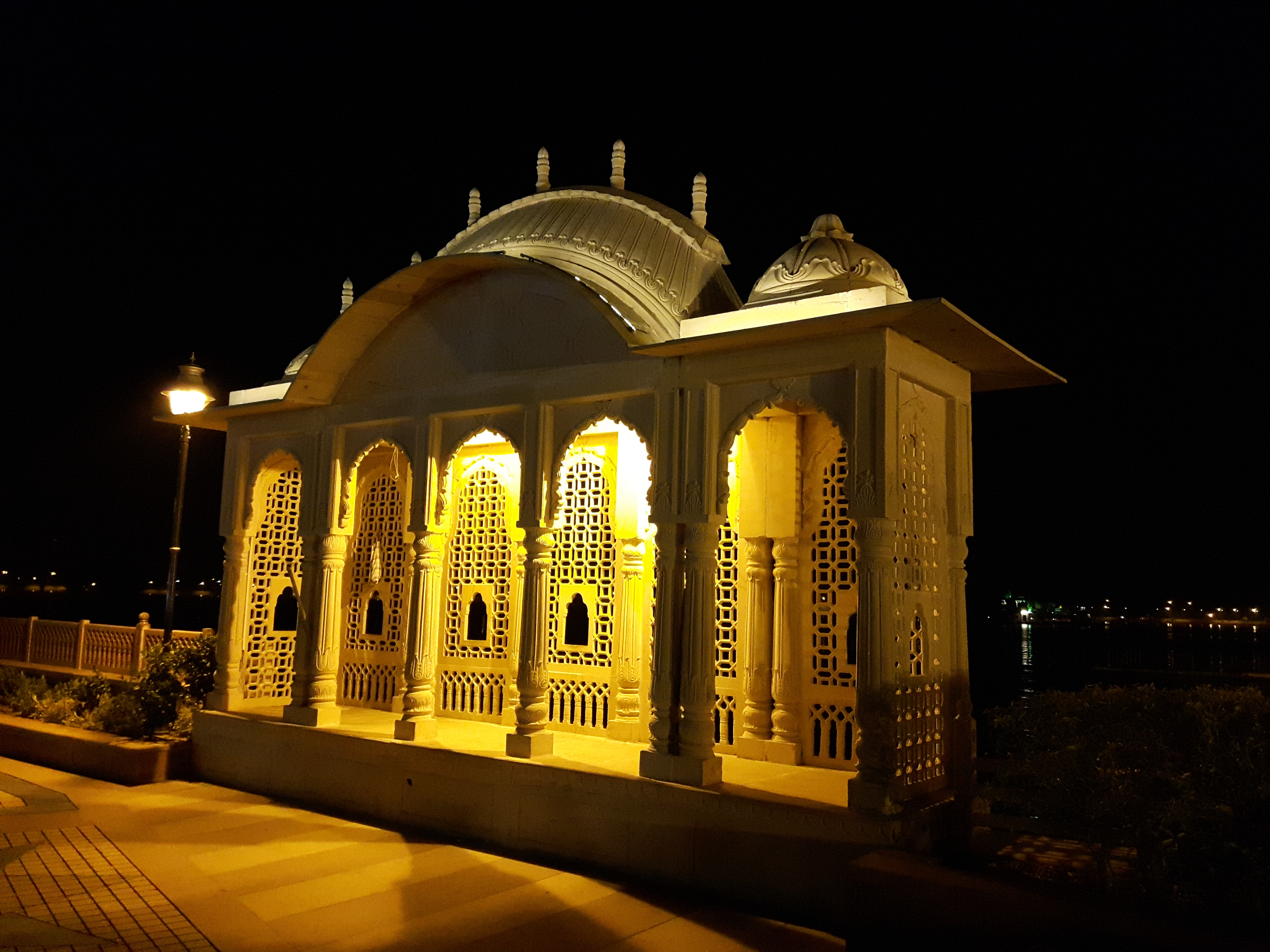
Jharokha at Park

Since its inauguration, the Seven Wonders Park has contributed significantly to the local tourism industry. It has attracted visitors from various parts of India and abroad, boosting the local economy and giving Kota fame as a tourist destination.

Since it opened, more than 25 lakh people have visited the Seven Wonders Park so far. On an average, 30,000 people visit it every month. Some visitors have complained about lack of maintenance at the park.

On the lines of Kota, another Seven Wonders Park has been built in New Delhi which is located between Sarai Kale Khan and Millennium Park.

== In popular culture ==
The Hindi cinema film Badrinath Ki Dulhania was shot at various locations in Kota including this park.

== See also ==
- Kishore Sagar Talab
- Taragarh Fort, Bundi
