= Pramod Maheshwari =

Indian educator and entrepreneur (born 1971)

- Born: 6 May 1971 (age 55); Kota, Rajasthan, India
- Education: Indian Institute of Technology Delhi
- Occupations: Educator, entrepreneur

Pramod Maheshwari (born 6 May 1971) is an Indian educator and entrepreneur and currently Founder Chairman, CEO and MD of Career Point Ltd. a Kota, India-based Education Company that runs Cram school for various examinations.

An IIT Delhi alumnus and physics teacher, Pramod founded Career Point in 1993 as a professional tutoring company from a small garage and 50 students. His company now coaches more than 25,000 students every year. He has also set-up four private universities, two engineering colleges and numerous schools across India.

== Early life ==
Born on 6 May 1971, as a second son to a grain trader, Pramod belonged to a traditional Marwari family. He studied at IIT Delhi. Pramod graduated in 1993 the same year he founded Career Point.

== Awards and honours ==
Pramod Maheshwari was honoured with Star CEO Award during the 3rd BT–YES Bank SME Awards held in 2012 in New Delhi.
