= Kota Chambal Bridge =

Cable-stayed bridge in Rajasthan, India

Kota hanging Bridge
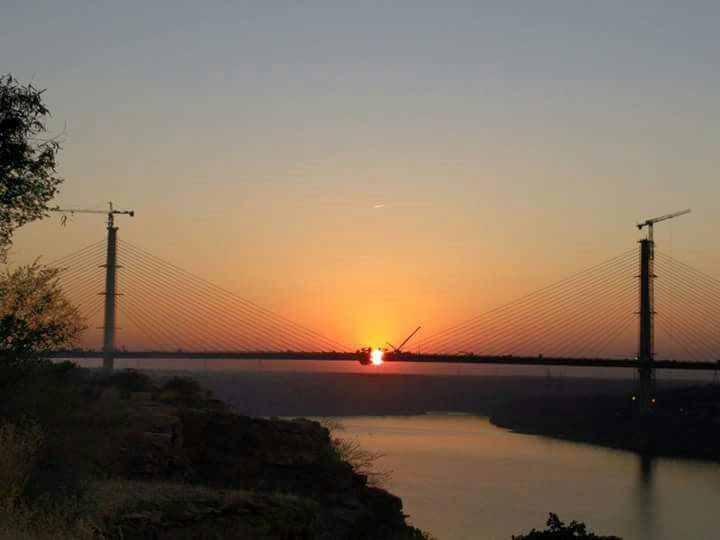
- Coordinates: 25°08′32″N 75°47′37″E
- Carries: North–South and East–West Corridor
- Crosses: Chambal River
- Locale: Kota, Rajasthan
- Official name: Kota Bypass Bridge
- Other name: Chambal Cable bridge
- Maintained by: National Highways Authority of India

Characteristics
- Design: Cable-stayed bridge
- Total length: 1,115 m (3,658 ft)
- Width: 30 meters
- Height: 125 metres (410 ft) (pylons)
- Longest span: 350.5 m (1,150 ft)
- Clearance above: 46 meters
- Clearance below: 46 metres

History
- Construction start: 2008
- Construction end: 2017

Statistics
- Toll: makeshift toll without environmental clearance renders the modern time saving bridge pointless with endless queues.

Location
- Interactive map of Kota hanging Bridge

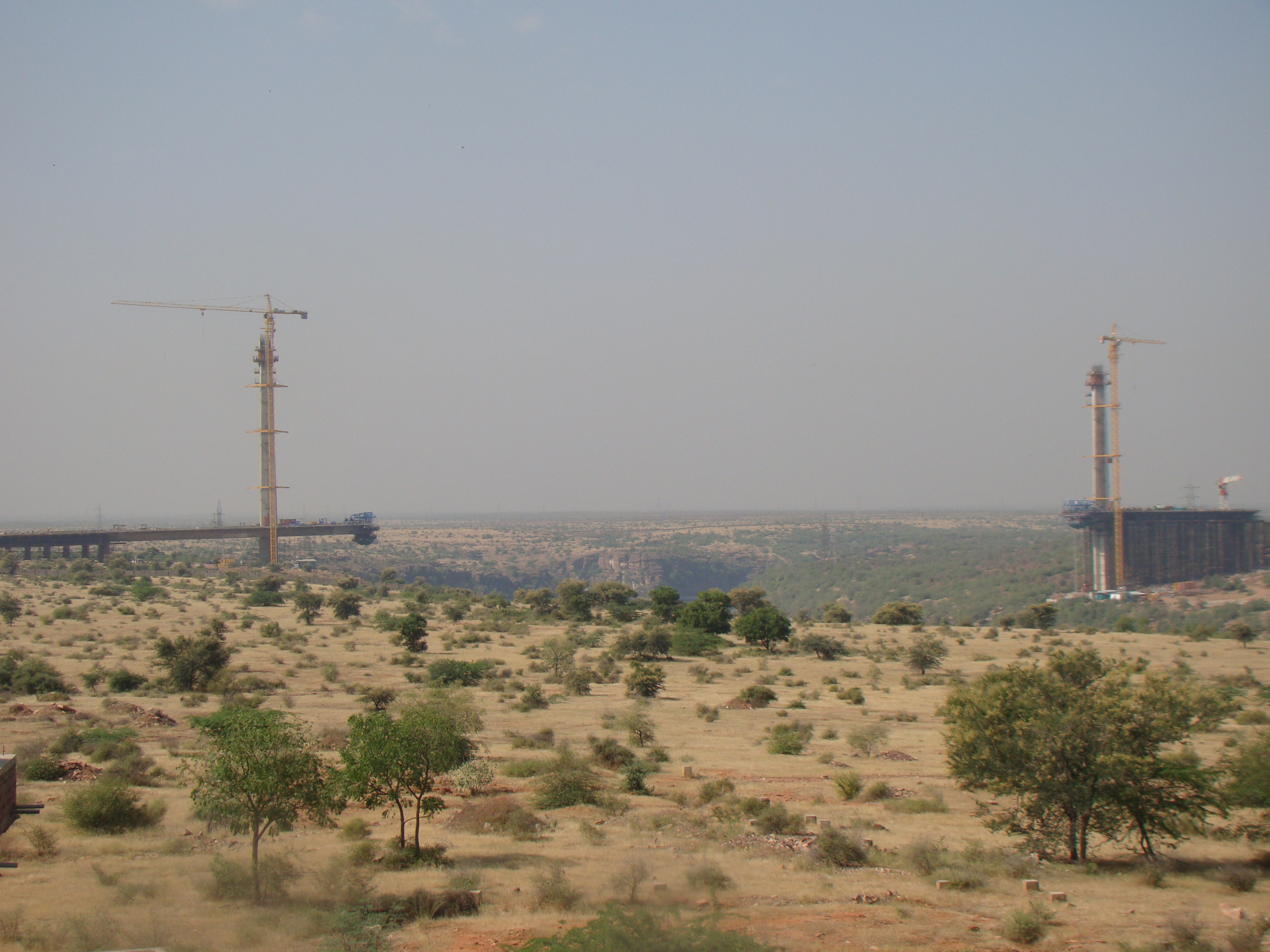
Bridge under construction in 2009

The Kota Bridge or Kota Chambal or Kota Cable Bridge is a cable-stayed bridge in Kota, Rajasthan. Initiated in 2006, the project faced a major setback when a span collapsed in 2009, killing 48 people and delaying completion until 2017. The bridge now stands as a six-lane engineering feat spanning 1,115 meters across the Chambal River. The bridge was inaugurated by Prime Minister of India Narendra Modi on 29 August 2017. It is a part of the Kota Bypass and crosses the Chambal River in the outskirts of the city.

== History ==
The construction of the Kota Chambal Bridge began in late 2006 as part of the East-West Corridor under the National Highways Development Programme by National Highways Authority of India (NHAI). The work got commenced with the foundation stone laid in November 2006 and work formally starting in 2007. In December 2009, a partially completed span collapsed during construction, killing 48 workers and engineers and prompting a multi-year halt until NHAI-mediated dispute resolution allowed work to resume in early 2014. Following renewed efforts and completion of all cable-stayed segments, the bridge was inaugurated by Prime Minister Narendra Modi on 29 August 2017, more than a decade after construction was commenced.

== Structure ==
The Kota Chambal Bridge is a single-plane, cable-stayed bridge with a total length of approximately 1,100 meters. This includes a 400-meter-long access viaduct and a 300-meter approach ramp on the eastern and western sides of the bridge. The main cable-stayed section features a central span of 350.5 meters flanked by two side spans of 175 meters each. The bridge deck, constructed using a steel-concrete composite box girder. It is about 30 meters wide and accommodates six traffic lanes, three in each direction. To prevent any disturbance to wildlife in the river, a 7.5 metre Noise Barrier with about 70% in every span of 700 metre length has also been installed on both sides of bridge.

== Accident ==
On 24 December 2009, at about 5.30 pm the under-construction west side of the bridge comprising span P4-P3, Pilon P4, Pier P4 and cantilever portion up to segment 10 (each segment being 3.5 meters) collapsed into the river below without any warning signs, killing 48 workers and engineers and injuring a few more.
