= Vinod Kumar Bansal =

Indian educationist and businessman (1949–2021)

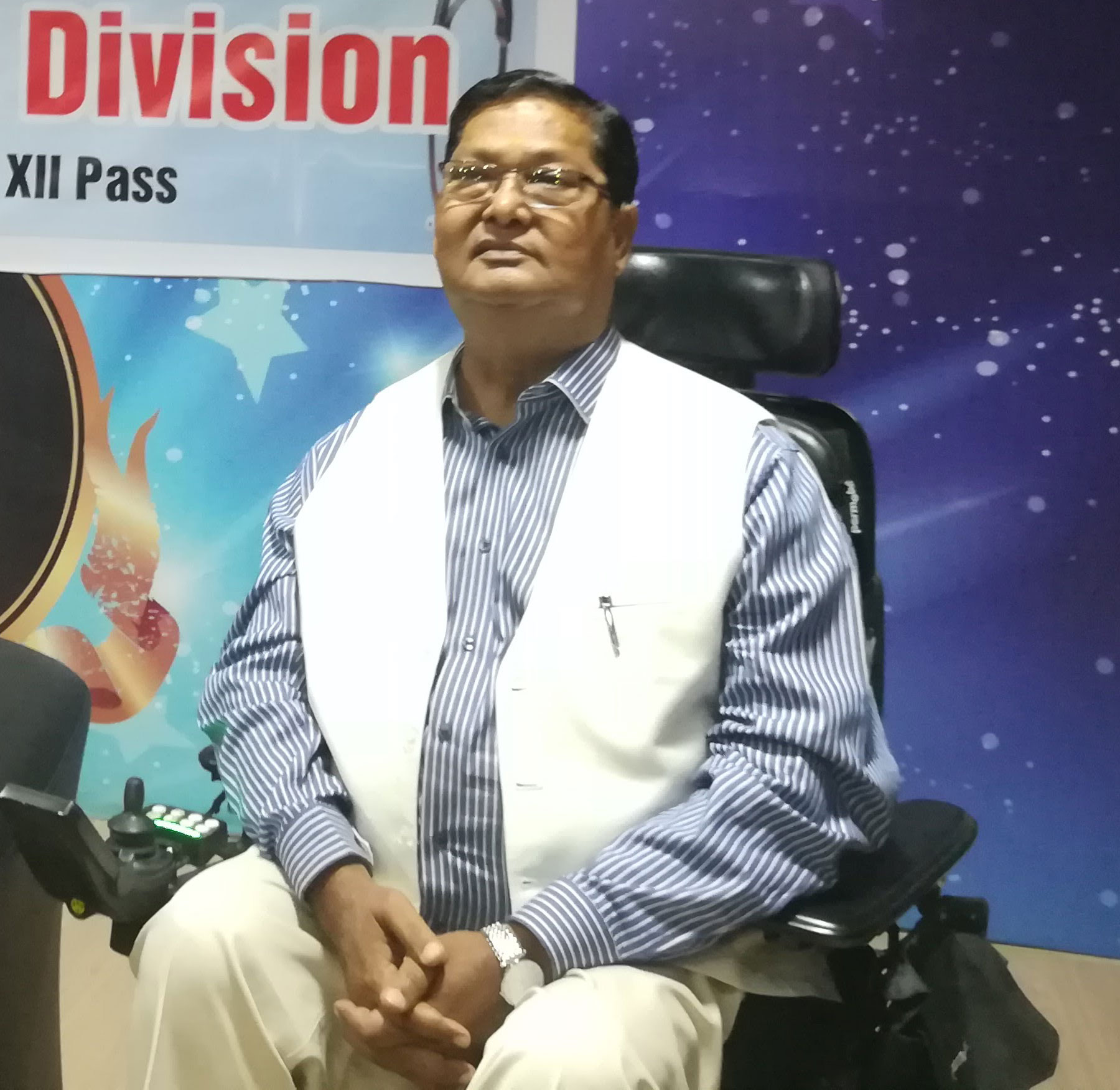
- Born: Vinod Kumar Bansal; 26 October 1949; Jhansi, United Provinces, India
- Died: 3 May 2021 (aged 71); Maitri hospital, Kota, Rajasthan
- Education: Mechanical engineering (B.Tech)
- Alma mater: Banaras Hindu University (now IIT-BHU Varanasi)
- Occupation: Teacher
- Known for: Founder of Bansal Classes
- Spouse: Neelam Bansal
- Children: 3
- Parents: Bisamber Dayal Agarwal; Anguri Devi
- Relatives: P. K. Bansal

Vinod Kumar Bansal or VK Bansal (26 October 1949 – 3 May 2021) was an Indian educationist and the founder of the Bansal Classes in Kota, Rajasthan. He made Kota famous throughout India for IIT-JEE entrance exam preparation.

== Biography ==
Bansal was born on 26 October 1949, in the Jhansi district of the state of Uttar Pradesh. His father was a government employee and his mother was a homemaker.

He completed his B.Tech in mechanical engineering from Banaras Hindu University (now IIT-BHU Varanasi) in 1971. After completing his education, he worked in a chemical company, J. K. Synthetics, in Kota, in 1971.

In 1974, Bansal was diagnosed with muscular dystrophy, which left him with complete paralysis and physical impairment, which was predicted to shorten his lifespan. In 1983, due to the financial crisis in Kota, J. K. Synthetics closed down. The same year, he met G. D. Agrawal of Mumbai, who suggested he start coaching students for the IIT-JEE, i.e., the undergraduate entrance test for the Indian Institutes of Technology. He started coaching for the IIT-JEE, starting with 8 students at his dining table. After a few of his students cleared the JEE in 1991, he founded Bansal Classes.

== Pioneer of Entrance Examination Coaching in India ==
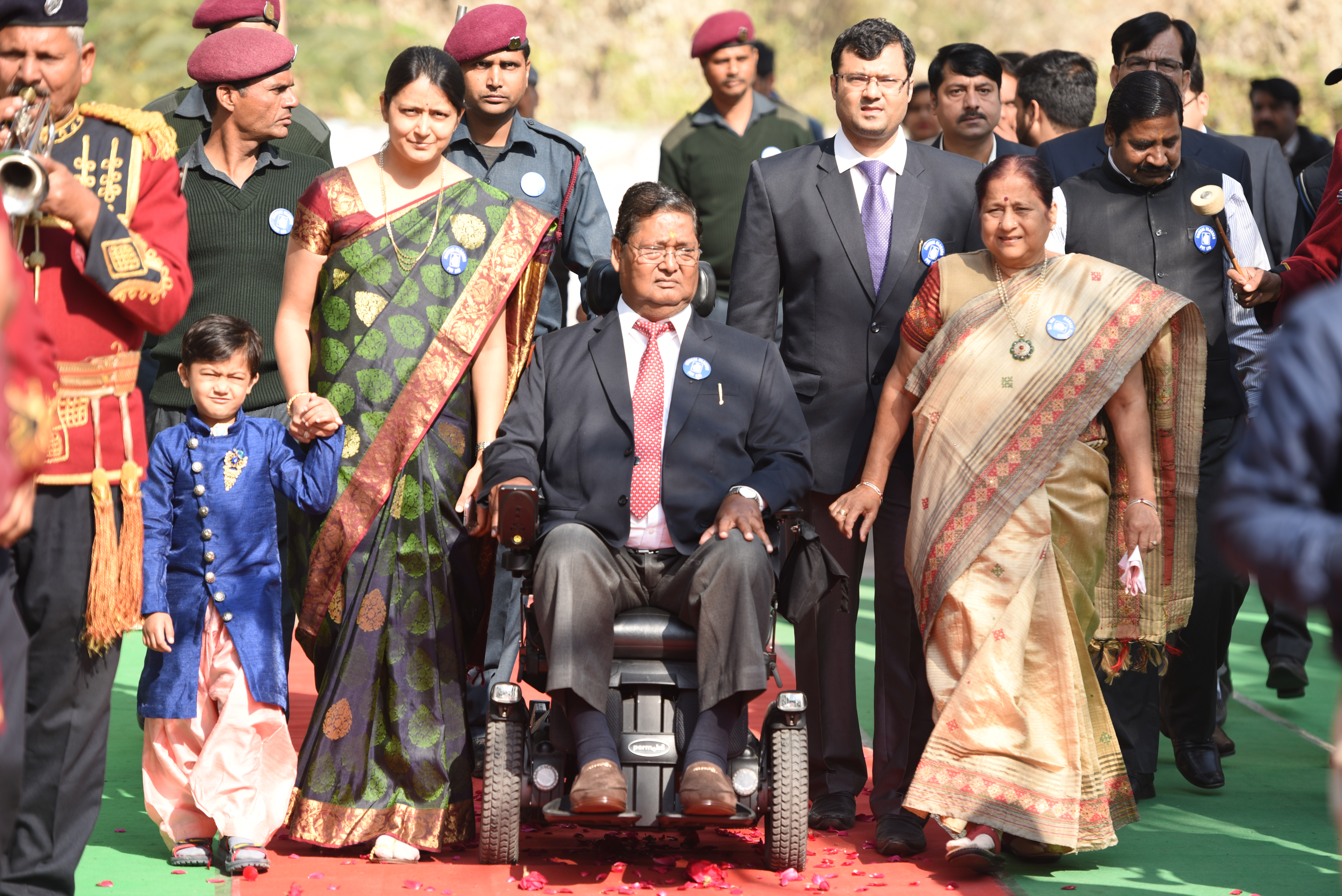
Bansal with family

Kota has since emerged as a principal coaching center in India, with nearly 150,000 students from across India enrolling in the 40 coaching institutes in Kota. In 2017, 39,000 of these students cleared the Joint Entrance Examination (Main) and at least 48 of them were in the top 100.

== Death ==
Bansal died on 3 May 2021, from a heart attack. He also tested positive for COVID-19 during the COVID-19 pandemic in India which worsened his pre-existing conditions.

According to his son Sameer Bansal, Managing Director of Bansal Classes, VK Bansal was the architect of the coaching industry in Kota.

On the demise of VK Bansal, Naveen Maheshwari stated, "It was his fresh vision that made a subject like Maths interesting. Lakhs of students will remember his contribution". He was also known as "architect of Kota"
