= Chambal Fertilisers =

Fertilzer manufacturer in India

- Type: Public
- Traded as: BSE: 500085; NSE: CHAMBLFERT
- Industry: Agrichemicals
- Founded: 1985; 41 years ago
- Headquarters: Kota, Rajasthan, India
- Key people: Saroj Poddar (Chairman); Shyam Sunder Bhartia (Co Chairman)
- Products: Fertilisers; Pesticides
- Revenue: ▲₹27,940 crore (US$2.9 billion) (FY23)
- Net income: ▼₹1,034 crore (US$110 million) (FY23)
- Parent: Adventz Group
- Website: chambalfertilisers.com

Chambal Fertilisers and Chemicals Ltd (CFCL) is an Indian agrochemicals manufacturing company based in Kota in Rajasthan. Established in the year 1985 by KK Birla Group, Chambal Fertilisers is the largest manufacturer of Urea in the private sector with an installed capacity of 1.5 million tonnes per annum. The fertiliser plant is located at Gadepan, Kota district, Rajasthan.

== Operations ==
The main activity of CFCL is the manufacture of nitrogenous fertiliser viz. production of Urea. CFCL is also involved in trading of many agricultural inputs. The company has also entered into the software, spinning and miniature potato seeds businesses.

The company exited its textiles business in 2015 and shipping business in 2017.
