= Sogariya =

Sogaria
- Census town
- Location in Rajasthan, India Sogaria (India)
- Coordinates: 25.2252°N 75.8971°E
- Country: India
- State: Rajasthan
- District: Kota

Population (2001)
  - Total: 8,832

Languages
  - Official: Hindi
- Time zone: UTC+5:30 (IST)
- ISO 3166 code: RJ-IN

Sogaria is a census town in Kota District in the Indian state of Rajasthan.

== Demographics ==
As of 2001 India census, Sogaria had a population of 8,832. Males constitute 53% of the population and females 47%. Sogaria has an average literacy rate of 74%, equal to the national average of 74%: male literacy is 85%, and female literacy is 62%. In Sogaria, 12% of the population is under 6 years of age.
