= Chambaleshwar Dam =

Dam in Madhya Pradesh, India

Chambaleshwar Dam is located on Kanjarda Plateau of Manasa tehsil in Neemuch district, in the Malwa region of the Indian state of Madhya Pradesh.

It has benefited 15 thousand farmers of Jawad and Manasa tehsils. Manasa also gets drinking water from the dam.
