= Kota Greenfield Airport =

Future airport to serve Kota, Rajasthan, India

- IATA: none; ICAO: none

Summary
- Airport type: Public
- Owner: Airport Authority of India
- Operator: Airport Authority of India
- Serves: Kota
- Location: Kota District, Rajasthan

Runways
Direction	Length		Surface
Direction	ft	m	Surface
11/29		3,200

Kota Greenfield Airport is a proposed airport, planned to be built at Shambupura village in Kota district, approximately 15 kilometres from Kota, 20 kilometres from Bundi and 50 kilometres from Rawatbhata, in Rajasthan, India. The airport will be built by the Airports Authority of India (AAI). It is expected to be ready for aircraft operations by October 2027.

== History ==
Kota's old airport is suitable only for Code-B type of aircraft. The airport is surrounded by densely populated areas and hence acquisition of land for further expansion is not feasible. Keeping in mind the consistent demand for air travel to Kota, the State Government identified a site suitable for the construction of a greenfield airport to serve Kota. In November 2021, the Rajasthan Government's Cabinet approved the airport's construction and allocated land free of cost. The Environment ministry's Forest Advisory Committee (FAC) approved the greenfield airport in December 2022. In the same month, the State Government approved a proposal of Rs 115 crore for works related to the construction of the airport. Rs 45 crore was to be borne by the Kota Urban Development Trust and the remaining Rs 75.80 crore by the State Government. The Rajasthan State Vidyut Prasaran Nigam Limited would spend Rs. 40 Crore for the work of shifting EHV power lines in the new Green Field Airport area, which will be carried out by Power Grid Corporation of India Limited. A tripartite Memorandum of Understanding MoU was signed in July 2024 between the AAI, the Urban Development Department, and the Civil Aviation Department of Rajasthan Government for the development of the airport. On May 5, 2025, the ministry of Civil Aviation granted in-principle approval for the establishment of the Greenfield airport. Prime Minister Narendra Modi formally laid the foundation stone of the airport, via video conferencing, on 7 March 2026.

== Structure ==
The airport site is within 10 kilometres of the Chambal Ghariyal wildlife sanctuary and within 60 kilometres of the Mukundara Hills National Park. The proposed airport falls in the notified buffer area of Ramgarh Vishdhari Wildlife Sanctuary and will use 466 hectares of forest land. According to AAI's project report submitted for forest clearance, the airport is being planned on 1250 acres for Airbus A320 type of aircraft in Phase 1, with a provision for 3200 metre long runway and an apron suitable for three Narrow-body aircraft. AAI will construct a terminal building measuring 20000 square metres, with a peak hour capacity of 1000 passengers. An Air Traffic Control tower and technical building, a car park for 250 vehicles and a public transport zone is also planned as part of Phase 1. In Phase 2, the runway will be extended to 3581 metres for operation of Code 4C aircraft along with precision approach CAT-1 lighting for IFR operations. Fifteen additional parking stands and a full-length parallel taxiway will also be built as part of Phase 2. The land for Greenfield Airport approx. about 440 hectares has been transferred to AAI in November, 2024 by Forest Department of Rajasthan. Bid has been invited for Airside development, which runway, apron, taxiways and other works of Rs.467.67 crore on February, 2025 by Airports Authority of India. Bid for City side development which includes terminal building, approach road, etc. will also be invited in the month of February, 2025. The total project cost is estimated for about Rs.1507 crore.
