= Chambal Garden =

Garden in Rajasthan, India

Coordinates: 25.1627988°N 75.8225541°E

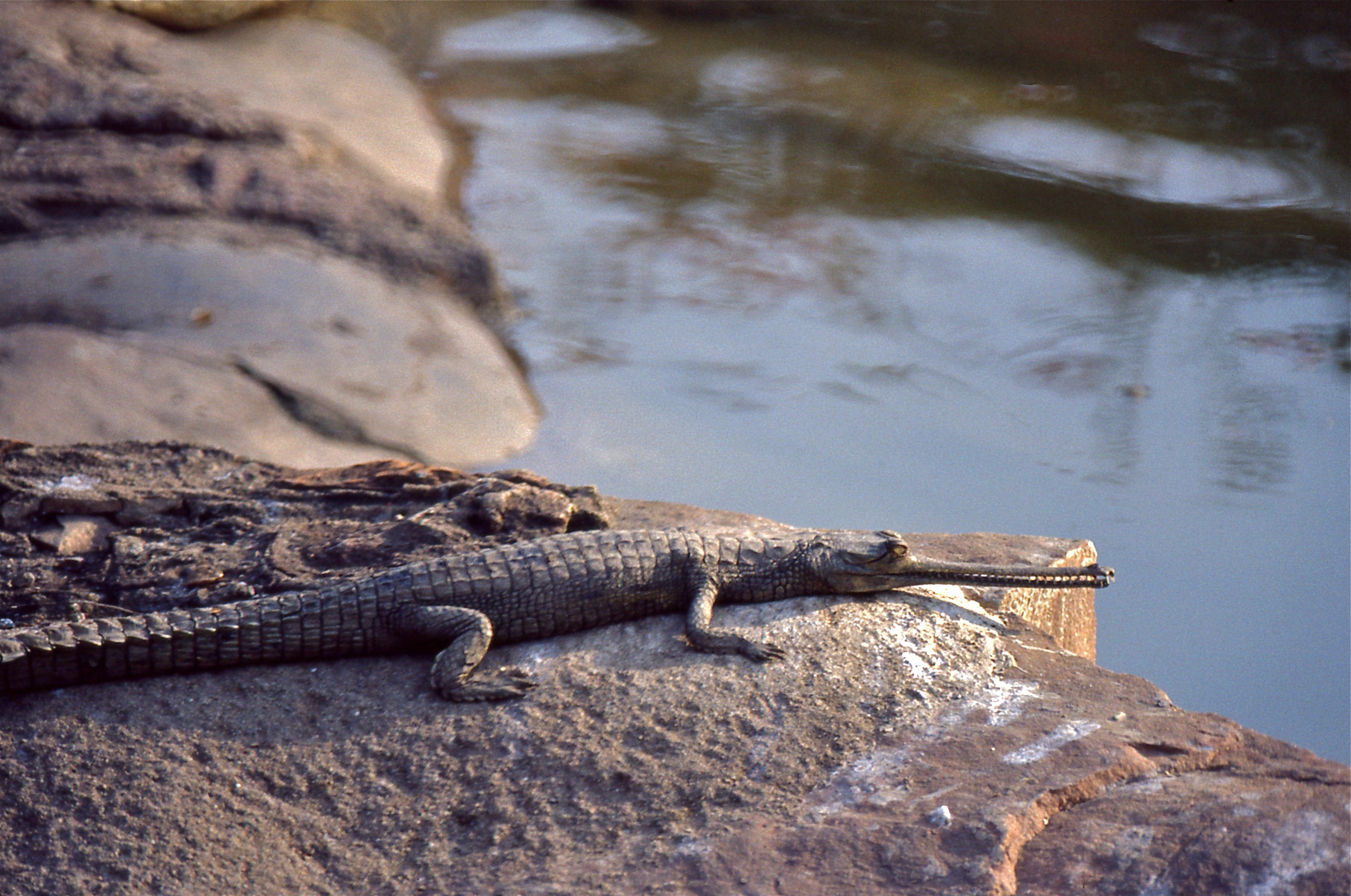
- A gharial at the Chambal Garden
- Type: Public garden
- Location: Near Kota Super Thermal Power Plant, Kota Southeastern Rajasthan, India

The Chambal Garden is located in southeastern Rajasthan, India on the banks of the Chambal River in the town of Kota (once part of the Rajput kingdom).

The well-groomed garden's centerpiece is a pond replete with gharials, which used to house magars as well. The pond can be crossed via a suspension bridge or by boat

Some scenes of the 2017 Bollywood film Badrinath Ki Dulhania were also shot here.
