= Jagson Airlines =

Charter airline in India

IATA	ICAO	Call sign
—	JGN	JAGSON
- Founded: 1991; 35 years ago
- Ceased operations: 2010; 16 years ago
- Hubs: Delhi, New Delhi
- Parent company: Jagson group
- Headquarters: Delhi, India
- Key people: Jagdish P. Gupta (Chairman)
- Website: jagsongroup

Jagson Airlines was an air charter company based in Delhi, India. It operated charter services in India.

== History ==
The company started charter operations in November 1991 with two 18-seat Dornier 228-201 aircraft. Jagsons Airlines Limited was incorporated in January 1994 to operate air-taxi services under the open sky policy of the Government. The company was promoted by J.P. Gupta, Pradeep Kumar Gupta and their associates. The company was to acquire four aircraft but commenced started operations with one Dornier 228.

In 2006, they announced plans to expand their services to 9 cities, using leased Airbus A321-200 aircraft. The airline received its regional airline licence from the DGCA in early 2009 but the regional services never took off within the stipulated 18 months, causing its regional airline license to lapse. However Jagson continued to possess its non-scheduled operator license. At the end of its operation, the company provided only charter services from Delhi and Mumbai, and did not operate scheduled flights. The company ended operation in 2010.

== Fleet ==
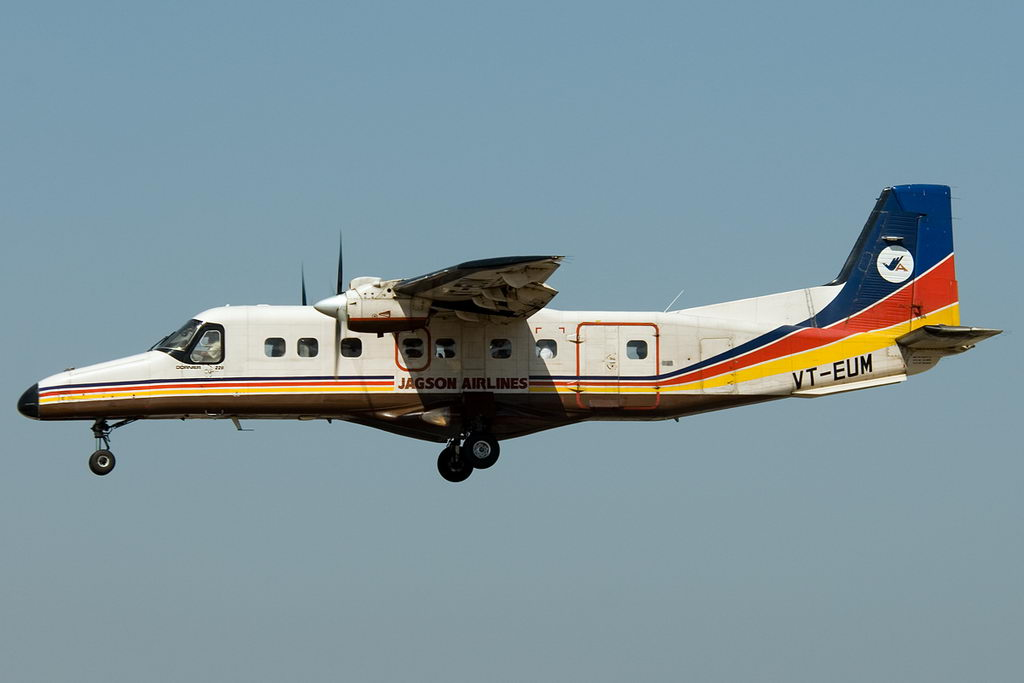
A Jagson Airlines Dornier 228 aircraft in the current livery.

As of 2014.

Jagson Airlines fleet
Aircraft	In service	Passengers (Economy)	Notes
Dornier 228-200	3	19	
Mil Mi-17	2	24	
Total	5		
