= Kishore Sagar Talab =

- Kishore Sagar Lake
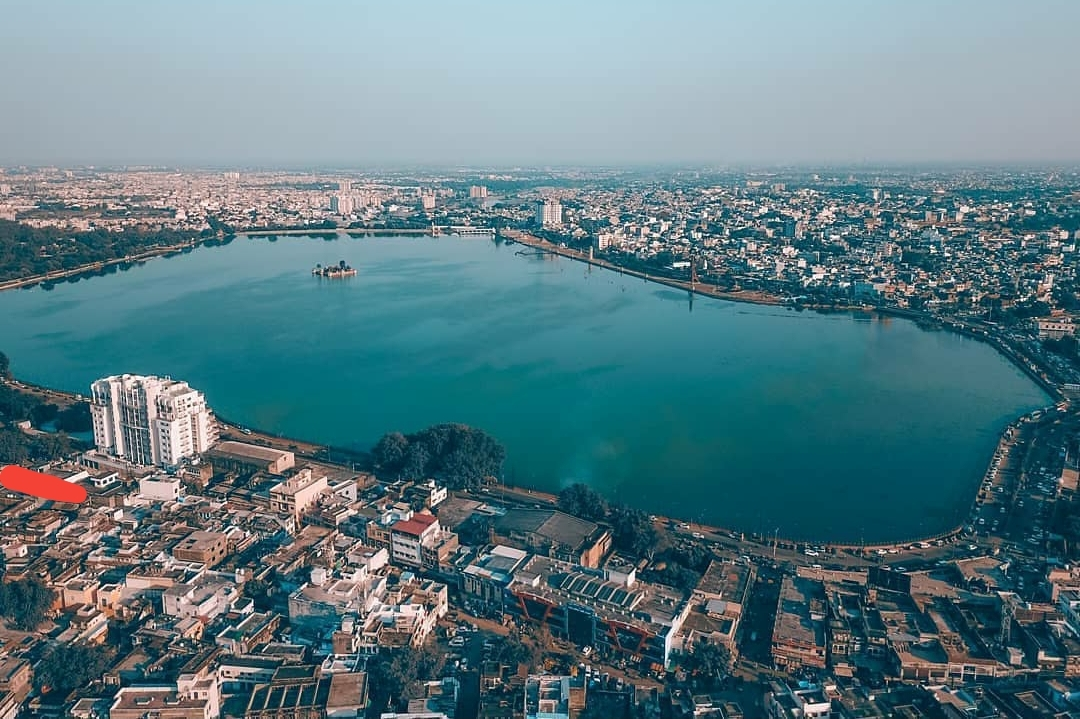
- Aerial view of Kishore Sagar
- Interactive map of Kishore Sagar Talab
- Location: Kota, Rajasthan
- Coordinates: 25.18°N 75.85°E
- Type: Reservoir, fresh water
- Built: 1346

Kishore Sagar Talab also known as Kishore Sagar lake is an artificial lake in the city of Kota, Rajasthan, India. It was constructed in the 14th century.

== History ==
The lake was created in 1346 at the request of the Bundi Prince Dehra Deh. In the 18th century, a small palace was built on the lake's central island during the reign of Maharani Brij Kunwar.

== See also ==
- Jait Sagar Lake
- Nawal Sagar Lake
