= Haldighati Passenger =

Train in India

Overview
- Service type: passenger
- Locale: Madhya Pradesh, Rajasthan, Uttar Pradesh
- Current operator: Western Railway

Route
- Termini: Ratlam Junction; Agra Fort
- Stops: 66
- Distance travelled: 694 km (431 mi)
- Average journey time: 21h 25m
- Service frequency: Daily
- Train number: 59812DN / 59811UP

On-board services
- Class: General Unreserved
- Seating arrangements: Yes
- Sleeping arrangements: Yes
- Auto-rack arrangements: No
- Catering facilities: No
- Observation facilities: No
- Entertainment facilities: No
- Baggage facilities: No

Technical
- Track gauge: Board Gauge
- Operating speed: 33 km/h (21 mph) average with halts

Haldighati Passenger is a passenger train of Indian Railways, which runs between Agra Fort railway station of Agra of Indian state Uttar Pradesh and Ratlam Junction railway station of Ratlam, Madhya Pradesh covering whole Haldighati region.

== Arrival and departure ==
- Train no. 59811 departs from Ratlam daily at 08:35 hrs. reaches Agra Fort, the next day at 06:00 hrs.
- Train no. 59812 departs from Agra Fort, daily at 18:45 hrs., reaching Ratlam the next day at 15:35.

== Route and halts ==
The train goes via Kota Junction. The important halts of the train are:

- Ratlam Junction
- Namli
- Brayla Chaurasi
- Jaora
- Dhodhar
- Kachnara Road
- Dalauda
- Mandsor
- Piplia
- Malhargarh
- Harkia Khal
- Nimach railway station
- Bisalwas Kalan
- Jawad Road
- Nimbahera
- Gambhiri Road
- Shambhupura
- Chittaurgarh Junction
- Chanderiya
- Parsoli
- Mandalgarh
- Shampura
- Upramal
- Jalindri
- Srinagar Rajasthan
- Bundi
- Kota Junction
- Gurla
- Keshorai Patan
- Arnetha
- Kapren
- Ghataka Varana
- Laban
- Lakheri
- Indargarh Sumerganj Mandi
- Amli
- Rawania Dungar
- Kushtala
- Sawai Madhopur Junction
- Ranthambhore
- Mokholi
- Malarna
- Nomoda
- Narayanpur Tatwara
- Lalpur Umri
- Gangapur City
- Chhoti Odai
- Pilioda
- Khandip
- Shri Mahabirji
- Hindaun City
- Fateh Singhpura
- Dumariya
- Bayana Junction
- Birambad
- Bandh Bareta
- Naglatula
- Bansi Paharpur
- Dhana Kherli
- Rupbas
- Aulenda
- Fatehpur Sikri
- Singarpur
- Kiraoli
- Mirhakur
- Pathauli
- Idgah Junction
- Agra Fort

== Coach composite ==
The train consists of 18 coaches:

- 1 First Class
- 3 Sleeper coaches
- 8 Unreserved
- 1 Ladies/Handicapped
- 2 Luggage/Brake van

== Average speed and frequency ==
The train runs with an average speed of 35 km/h. The train runs on a daily basis.

== Loco link ==
The train is hauled by Ratlam WDM-3 Diesel engine till Kota then with Kota to Agra Fort:- WAM 4E Vadodara (BRC) shed.

== Rake maintenance & sharing ==
The train is maintained by the Ratlam Coaching Depot. The same rake is used for Kota Agra Yamuna Bridge Passenger, one way which is altered by the second rake on the other way.
