= Patna–Kota Express =

Train in India

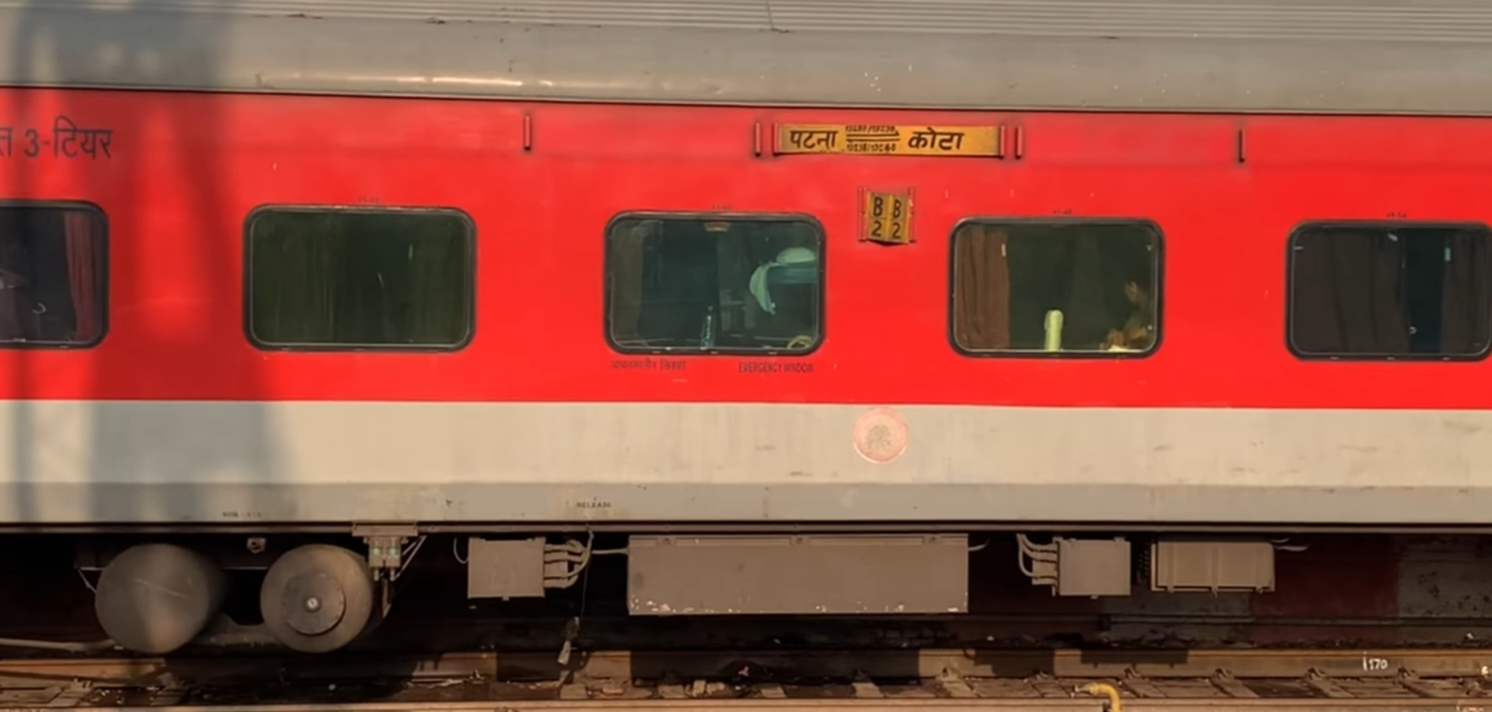
- Patna Kota Express at Faizabad Junction railway station

Overview
- Service type: Express
- Locale: Bihar, Uttar Pradesh & Rajasthan
- Current operator: East Central Railway

Route
- Termini: Patna Junction (PNBE); Kota Junction (KOTA)
- Stops: 26
- Distance travelled: 1,279 km (795 mi)
- Average journey time: 24 hours 10 minutes
- Service frequency: Daily
- Train numbers: 13237 / 13238; 13239 / 13240

On-board services
- Classes: AC 2 Tier, AC 3 Tier, Sleeper class, General Unreserved
- Seating arrangements: Yes
- Sleeping arrangements: Yes
- Catering facilities: Available
- Observation facilities: Large windows
- Baggage facilities: Available

Technical
- Rolling stock: LHB coach
- Track gauge: Broad gauge
- Operating speed: 53 km/h (33 mph) average including halts

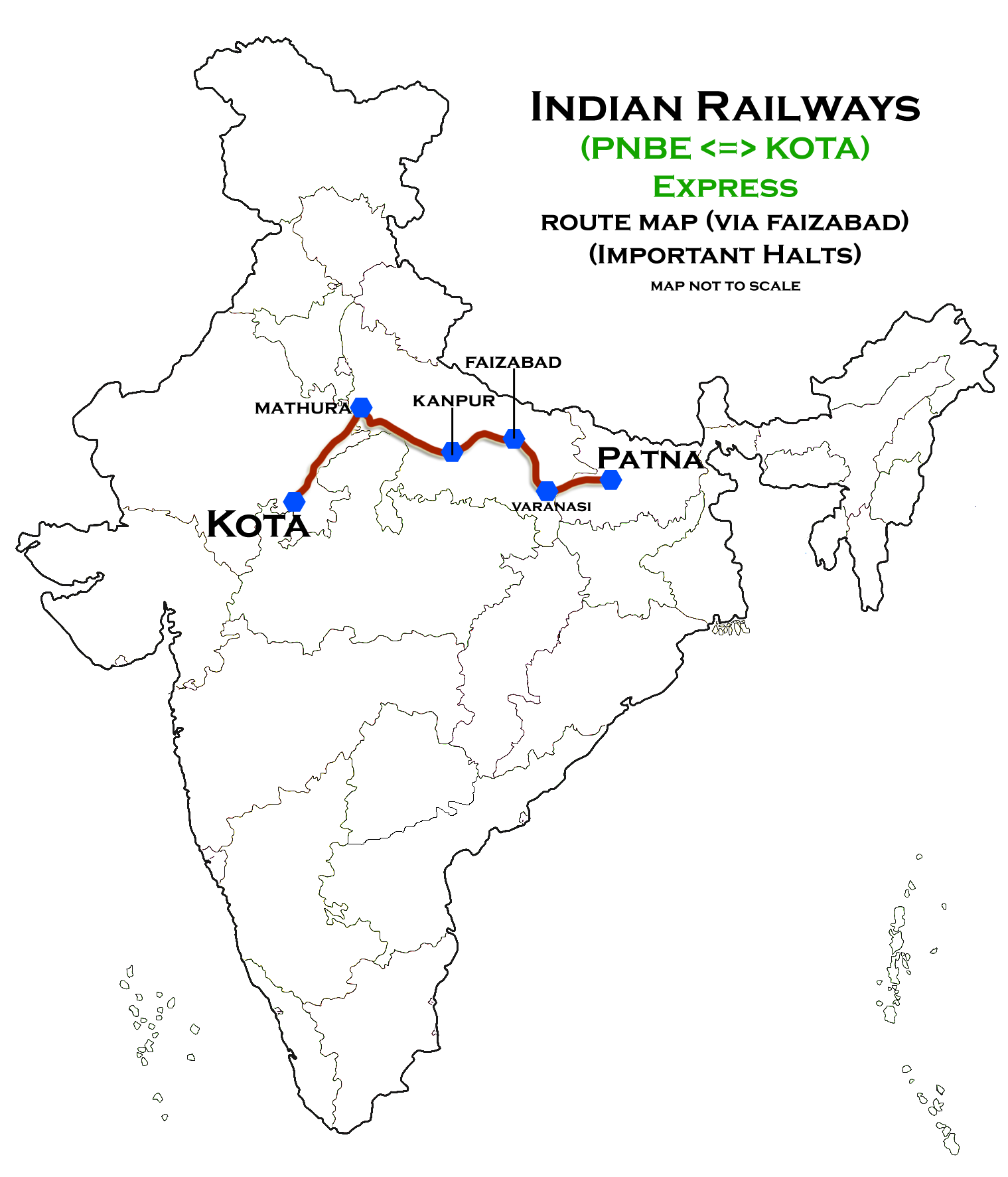
(Patna–Kota) Express (via Ayodhya) route map

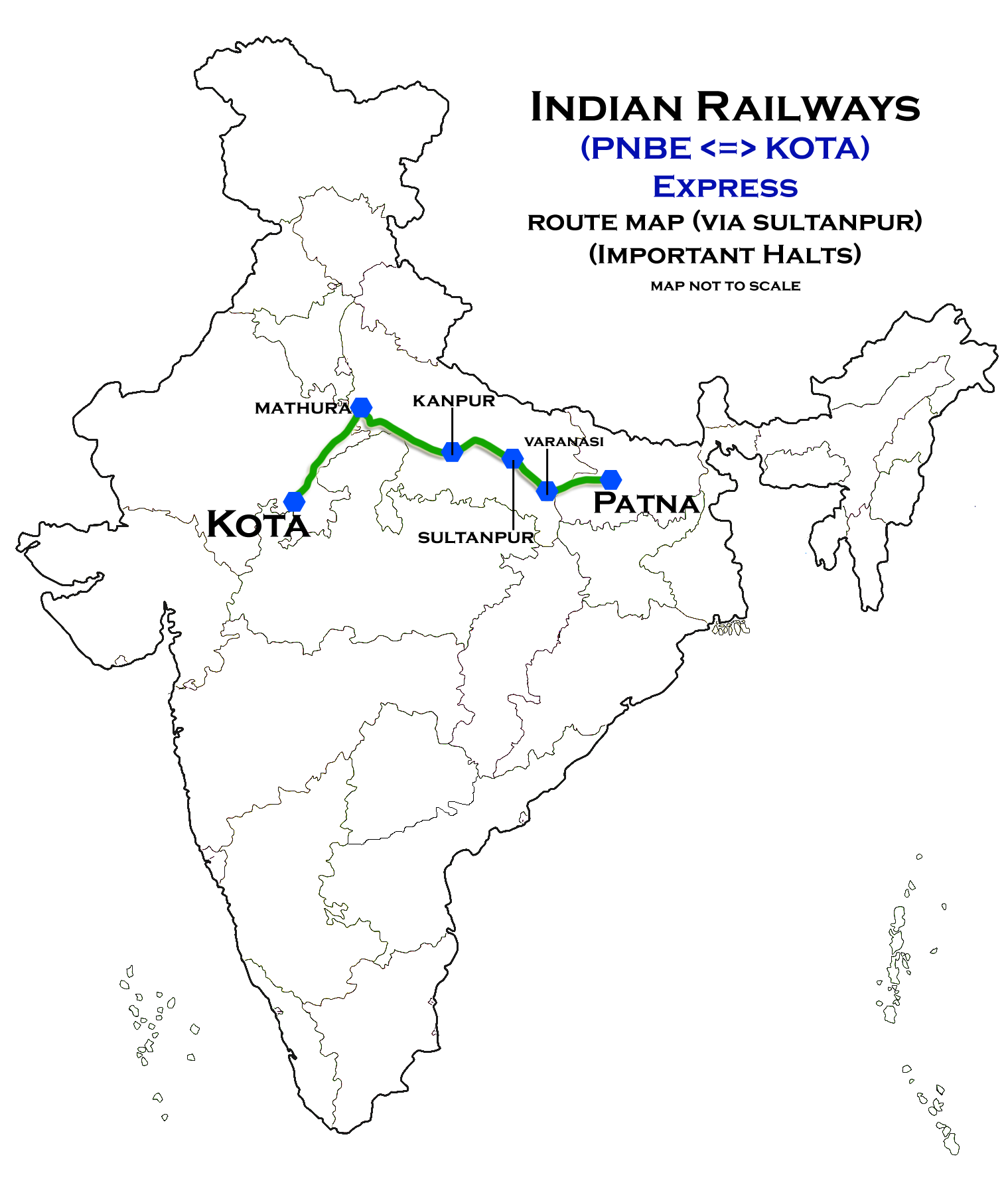
(Patna–Kota) Express (via Sultanpur) route map

The Patna–Kota Express is an express train of the Indian Railways, which runs between Patna Junction the capital of Bihar and Kota Junction in Rajasthan. This train is famous among students of Bihar. Its train numbers are 13237 / 13238 & 13239 / 13240.

== History ==
Previously, the train ran between Lucknow and Mathura, later extended up to Patna and then Kota in July 2012.

== Arrival and departure ==
Train number 13237, 13239 depart from Patna Junction at 11:50, reaching Kota Junction the next day at 12:55. Train number 13238, 13240 departs from Kota at 18:10 and reach Patna the next day at 21:20.

== Rake/Coach composition ==
LHB rake

== RSA ==
Rake sharing: 13239/13240

== Traction ==
As both the routes are now fully electrified, it is hauled by a Kanpur Loco Shed or Gomoh Loco Shed based WAP-7 electric locomotive on its entire journey.

== Loco/Rake reversals ==
- MTJ/Mathura Junction.

== Schedule ==
Detail of PNBE–KOTA Express
| Train No. | Sector | Departure | Arrival | Frequency | Average speed | Stops | Distance |
|---|---|---|---|---|---|---|---|
| 13237 | Patna – Kota (via Ayodhya) | 11:50 | 12:55 | Tue, Sat, Sun | 50 km | Patna Junction, Danapur Junction, Ara Junction, Buxar, Zamania, Pandit Deen Dayal Upadhyaya Junction, Varanasi Junction, Jaunpur Junction, Shahganj Junction, Akbarpur Junction, Ayodhya Junction, Lucknow NR, Kanpur Central, Tundla Junction, Raja Ki Mandi, Agra City, Mathura Junction, Bharatpur Junction, Bayana Junction, Hindaun City, Gangapur City, Narayanpur Tatwara, Sawai Madhopur Junction, Indragarh Sumerganj Mandi, Kota Junction | 1262 km |
| 13238 | Kota – Patna (via Ayodjya) | 15:25 | 17:20 | Thur, Fri, Sun | 48 km | Kota Junction, Indragarh Sumerganj Mandi, Sawai Madhopur Junction, Narayanpur Tatwara, Gangapur City, Hindaun City, Bayana Junction, Bharatpur Junction, Mathura Junction, Agra City, Raja Ki Mandi, Tundla Junction, Kanpur Central, Unnao, Lucknow NR, Ayodhya Junction, Akbarpur Junction, Shahganj Junction, Jaunpur Junction, Varanasi Junction, Pandit Deen Dayal Upadhyaya Junction, Zamania, Buxar, Ara Junction, Danapur Junction, Patna Junction | 1262 km |
| 13239 | Patna – Kota (via Sultanpur) | 11:50 | 12:55 | Mon, Wed, Thur, Fri | 48 km | Patna Junction, Ara Junction, Buxar, Zamania, Pandit Deen Dayal Upadhyay Junction, Varanasi Junction, Sultanpur Junction, Lucknow NR, Kanpur Central, Tundla Junction, Raja Ki Mandi, Agra Cantonment, Mathura Junction, Bharatpur Junction, Bayana Junction, Hindaun City, Gangapur City, Narayanpur Tatwara, Sawai Madhopur Junction, Indragarh Sumerganj Mandi, Kota Junction | 1064 km |
| 13240 | Kota – Patna (via Sultanpur) | 15:25 | 17:20 | Mon, Tue, Wed, Sat | 47 km | Kota Junction, Indragarh Sumerganj Mandi, Sawai Madhopur Junction, Narayanpur Tatwara, Gangapur City, Hindaun City, Bayana Junction, Bharatpur Junction, Mathura Junction, Agra Cantonment, Raja Ki Mandi, Tundla Junction, Kanpur Central, Lucknow NR, Sultanpur Junction, Varanasi Junction, Pandit Deen Dayal Upadhyay Junction, Zamania, Buxar, Ara Junction, Patna Junction | 1222 km |
