= Prayagraj–Udhna (Surat) Amrit Bharat Express =

Amrit Bharat Express train route in India

Prayagraj – Udhna (Surat) Amrit Bharat Express

Overview
- Service type: Amrit Bharat Express, Superfast
- Status: Active
- Locale: Gujarat, Madhya Pradesh, Rajasthan and Uttar Pradesh
- First service: 21 August 2026; 2 months ago (Inaugural); 24 August 2026; 2 months ago (Commercial)
- Current operator: North Central Railways (NCR)

Route
- Termini: Prayagraj Junction (PRYJ); Udhna Junction (UDN)
- Stops: 16
- Distance travelled: 1,440 km (895 mi)
- Average journey time: 22 hrs 45 mins
- Service frequency: Weekly
- Train number: 20437/20438
- Lines used: Prayagraj–Fatehpur–Govindpuri Towards (Etawah Junction); Tundla–Idgah Agra line; Bayana–Gangapur City line; Sawai Madhopur–Kota line; Ramganj Mandi–Bhawani–Ratlam line; Ratlam–Vadodara line; Vadodara–Udhna line

On-board services
- Classes: Sleeper class coach (SL); General unreserved coach (GS)
- Seating arrangements: Yes
- Sleeping arrangements: Yes
- Auto-rack arrangements: Upper
- Catering facilities: No
- Observation facilities: Saffron-grey
- Entertainment facilities: Electric outlets; Reading lights; Bottle holder
- Other facilities: CCTV cameras; Bio-vacuum toilets; Foot-operated water taps; Passenger information system

Technical
- Rolling stock: Modified LHB coaches
- Track gauge: Indian gauge
- Electrification: 25 kV 50 Hz AC overhead line
- Operating speed: 63 km (39 mi) (Avg.)
- Track owner: Indian Railways
- Rake sharing: Yes
Route map
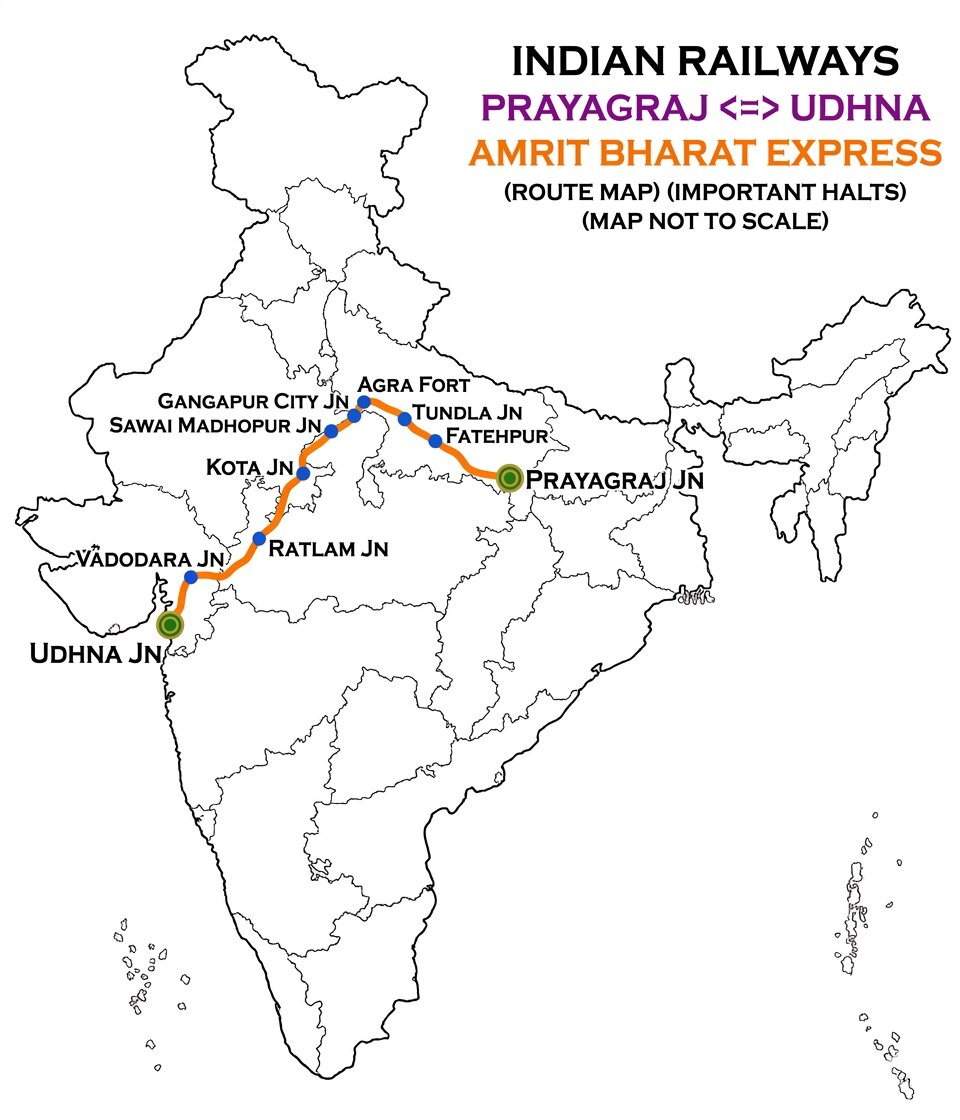

The 20437/20438 Prayagraj–Udhna (Surat) Amrit Bharat Express is India's 39th Non-AC Superfast Amrit Bharat Express train, which runs across the states of Uttar Pradesh, Rajasthan, Madhya Pradesh and Gujarat by connecting Prayagraj Junction of Prayagraj, the Holy Sangam city in Uttar Pradesh with Udhna Junction of the Silk weaving city of Surat of Gujarat.

The express train is inaugurated on 2026 by Honorable Prime Minister Narendra Modi through video conference.

== Overview ==
The train is operated by Indian Railways, connecting Prayagraj Junction and Udhna Junction. It is currently operated 20437/20438 on weekly basis.

== Rakes ==
It is the 39th Amrit Bharat 2.0 Express train in which the locomotives were designed by Chittaranjan Locomotive Works (CLW) at Chittaranjan, West Bengal and the coaches were designed and manufactured by the Integral Coach Factory at Perambur, Chennai under the Make in India Initiative.

== Schedule ==
Train Schedule: Prayagraj↔ Udhna (Surat) Amrit Bharat Express
Train No.	Station Code	Departure Station	Departure Time	Departure Day	Arrival Station	Arrival Hours
20437	PRYJ	Prayagraj Junction	05:20 AM	Udhna Junction	04:05 AM	22h 45m
20438	UDN	Udhna Junction	06:45 AM	Prayagraj Junction	07:30 AM	24h 45m

== Routes and halts ==
The important halts of the train are :

- Prayagraj Junction
- Fatehpur
- Govindpuri
- Etawah Junction
- Tundla Junction
- Idgah Agra
- Bayana Junction
- Hindaun City
- Gangapur City Junction
- Sawai Madhopur Junction
- Kota Junction
- Ramganj Mandi Junction
- Bhawani Mandi
- Ratlam Junction
- Vadodara Junction
- Udhna Junction

== Rake reversal or rake share ==
The rake sharing with Lokmanya Tilak Terminus–Prayagraj Amrit Bharat Express (20435/20436).

== See also ==
- Amrit Bharat Express
- Vande Bharat Sleeper Express
- Vande Bharat Express
- Uday Express
- Humsafar Express

== Notes ==
a. Runs a day in a week with both directions.
