= Balaguda =

- Village
- Location in Madhya Pradesh, India Balaguda (India)
- Coordinates: 24.165637°N 74.948366°E
- Country: India
- State: Madhya Pradesh
- District: Mandsaur

Population (2011)
  - Total: 2,612

Languages
- Time zone: UTC+5:30 (IST)
- Postal code: 458664
- ISO 3166 code: IN-MP
- Vehicle registration: MP-14

Balaguda, is a village and gram panchayat Mandsaur district in the Indian state of Madhya Pradesh. This village is declared as Aaadarsh gram in Sansad Adarsh Gram Yojana scheme.

== Demographics ==
Balaguda had a population of 2,612.

== Transports ==
Balaguda Village is well connected with roads, is situated on Pipliya-Balaguda-Pratapgarh(R.J) Road. It is 8 km from Pipliya Mandi. Balaguda is 6 km away from Bahi Chaupati located on Ajmer-Lebad National Highway-79/Mhow-Neemuch SH-31.
