= Amli railway station =

Railway station in Rajasthan, India

General information
- Location: Amli, Sawai Madhopur, Rajasthan; India
- Coordinates: 25.8281°N 76.2857°E
- Elevation: 238 metres (781 ft)
- System: Indian Railways station
- Owner: Indian Railways
- Operator: Kota railway division
- Line: Jaipur–Sawai Madhopur line
- Platforms: 2
- Tracks: 4
- Connections: Auto stand

Construction
- Structure type: Standard (on ground station)
- Parking: No
- Cycle facilities: No

Other information
- Status: Functioning
- Station code: AMLI
- Fare zone: West Central Railway
Location

Amli railway station is a small railway station in Sawai Madhopur district, Rajasthan. Its code is AMLI. It serves Amli village. The station consists of two platforms. The platforms are not well sheltered. It lacks many facilities including water and sanitation. It is connected to some villages – hameerpura, mallapura, shahpura khurd, balapura etc.

== Major trains ==
- Haldighati Passenger
- Bhopal–Jodhpur Passenger
- Kota–Agra–Yamuna Bridge Passenger
- Mathura–Ratlam Passenger
- Agra Fort–Kota Passenger
