= JWO =

JWO may refer to:

- Juggalo World Order, a professional wrestling stable which wrestles for Juggalo Championship Wrestling
- Joint War Organisation, a defunct humanitarian aid organizations of World Wars
- JWO, the IATA code for Jungwon Air Base, South Korea
- JWO, the Indian Railways station code for Jawad Road railway station, Madhya Pradesh, India
