= Suwasra railway station =

Railway station in Madhya Pradesh, India

Suwasra

General information
- Location: Suwasra, Mandsaur district, Madhya Pradesh
- Coordinates: 24°04′11″N 75°38′55″E
- Elevation: 455 metres (1,493 ft)
- System: Indian Railways station
- Owner: Indian Railways
- Operator: West Central Railway
- Line: New Delhi–Mumbai main line
- Platforms: 2
- Tracks: 2

Construction
- Structure type: Standard
- Parking: Yes

Other information
- Status: Functioning
- Station code: SVA
- Zone(s): West Central Railway
- Division(s): Kota
Location
- Location within India Location within Madhya Pradesh

Suwasra railway station is a railway station in Mandsaur district of Madhya Pradesh. Its code is SVA. It has two platforms. Passenger, Express and Superfast trains halt here.

== See also ==
- Suwasra
