= Farsho =

Farso
- Village
- Location within Rajasthan Location within India
- Coordinates: 27.03°N 77.31°E
- Country: India
- State: Rajasthan
- District: Bharatpur

Languages
  - Official: Hindi
- Time zone: UTC+5:30 (IST)
- ISO 3166 code: RJ-IN

Farso is a village in the district of Bharatpur, Rajasthan in western India. It primarily has an agricultural economy and its residents are Hindu. Firmly focused on education for its children, 100% of school-aged children attend school and it has a 66% literacy rate.

== Geography ==
It is located on the bank of the Vand Ganga River and is 2 km from the town of Virampura, 11 km from Ucchain, and 12 km from Bayana Tehseal.

== Government ==
This village is a Gram Panchayat, which includes Nagla Navariya, Honta Kaa Nagla, Kurvariya and Farsho. Sarpanch of the village is Devi Singh Foujdar. The village is a capital kingdom of Jat Maharajah.

== Demographics ==
All of its citizens are Hindu. As of 2001 India census, Farsho had a population of 4,560. Males constitute 54% of the population and females 46%. Bharatpur has an average literacy rate of 66%, higher than the national average of 59.5%; with male literacy of 75% and female literacy of 56%. 15% of the population is under 6 years of age.

== Economy ==
This village economy is mostly dependent upon agriculture, but there are also supporting businesses like milk collection services, contractors, marketing and trade promoters, and educators.

== Education ==
Of the current school aged children in the village, 100% are educated. Of the previous generation, 78% were educated.
