= Indore–Kota Intercity Express =

Train in India

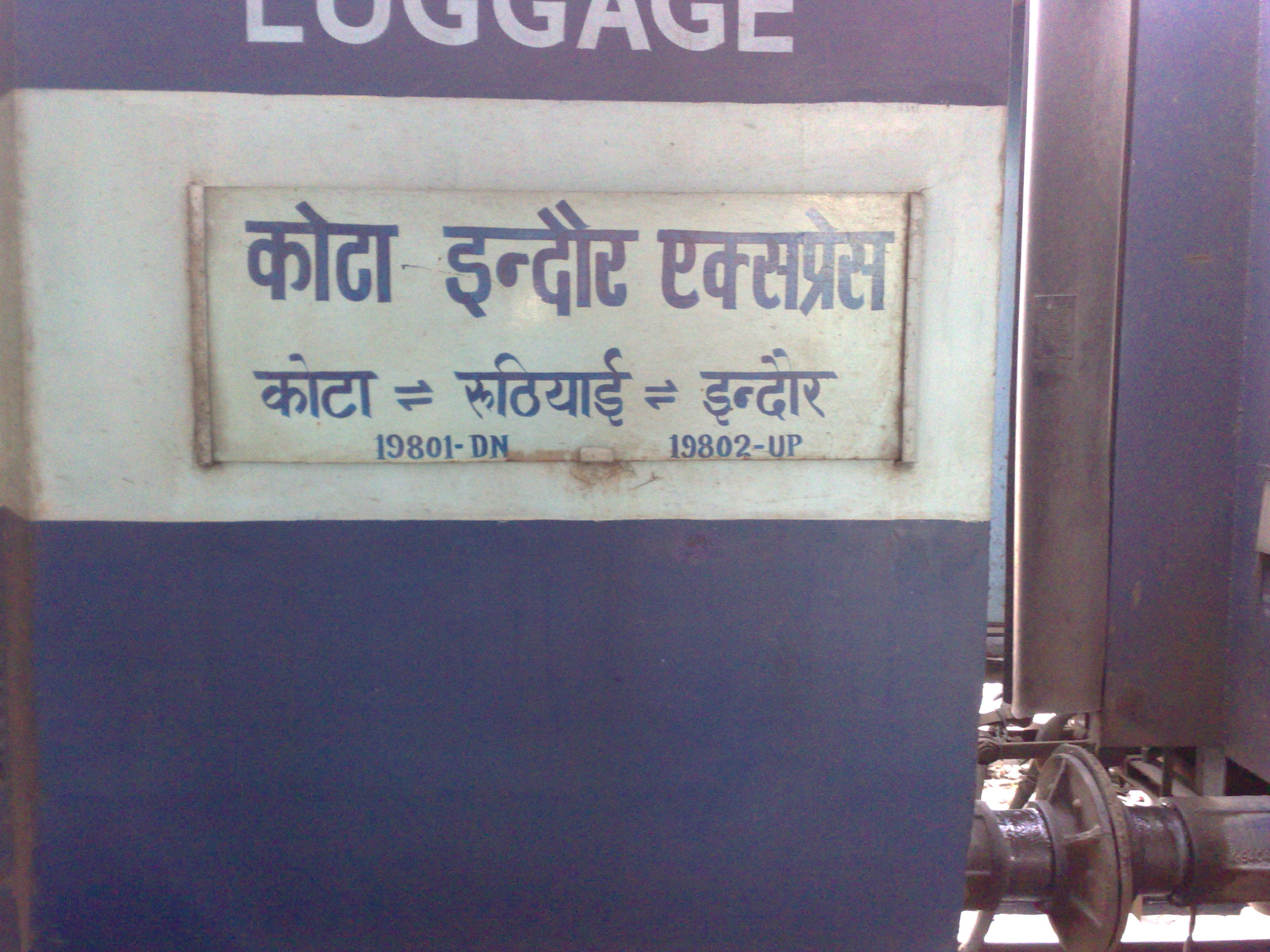

Overview
- Service type: Intercity Express
- Locale: Madhya Pradesh, Rajasthan
- First service: 12 November 2011; 14 years ago
- Current operator: West Central Railways

Route
- Termini: Indore Junction (INDB); Kota Junction (KOTA)
- Stops: 12
- Distance travelled: 433 km (269 mi)
- Average journey time: 7 hrs 50 mins
- Service frequency: Daily
- Train number: 22983/22984

On-board services
- Classes: AC Chair Car, 2nd Seating, General Unreserved
- Seating arrangements: Yes
- Sleeping arrangements: No
- Catering facilities: No

Technical
- Track gauge: 1,676 mm (5 ft 6 in)
- Operating speed: Average speed: 55 km/h (34 mph) Maximum speed: 110 km/h (68 mph)

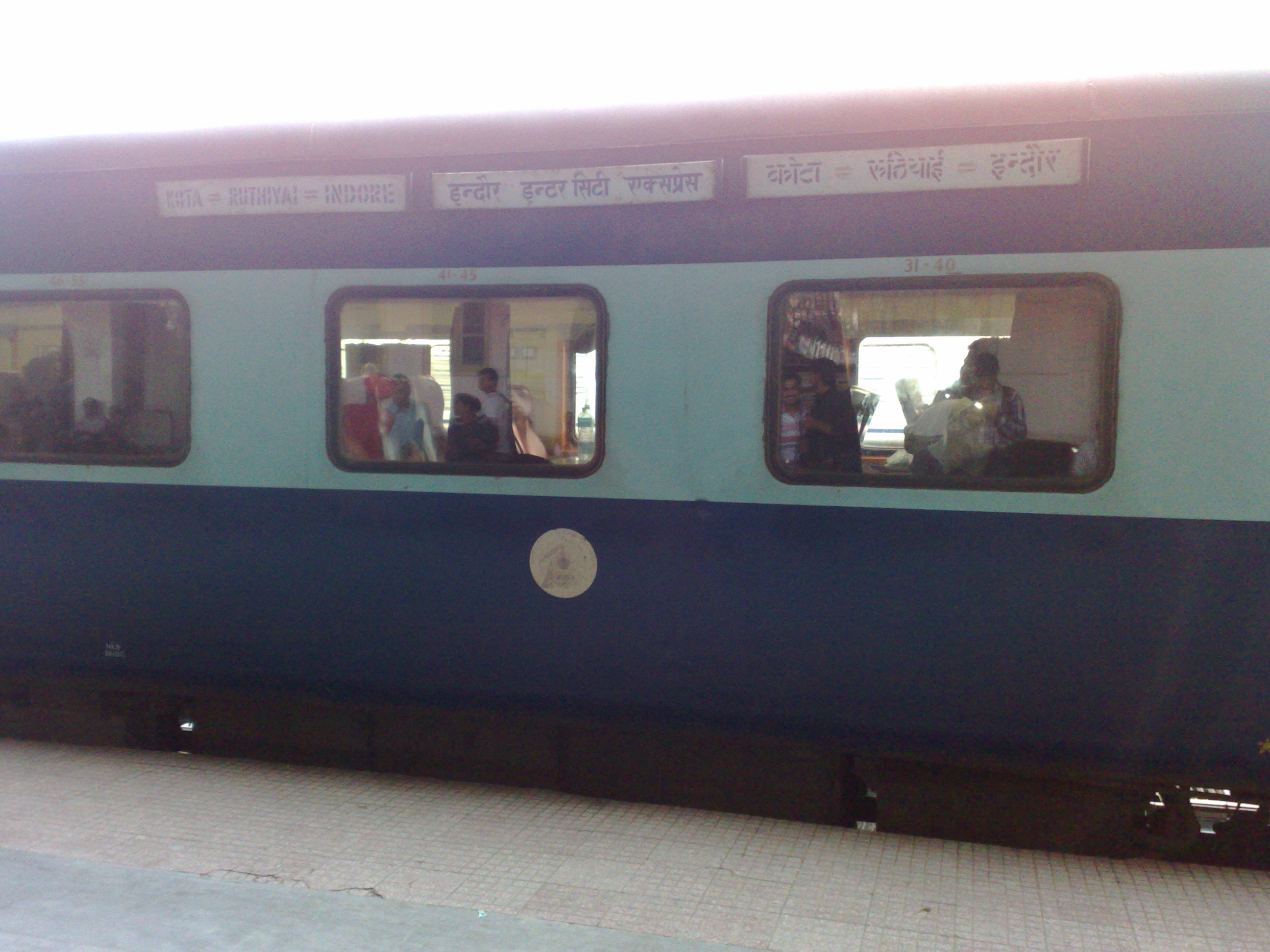
Kota–Indore Intercity Express: Chair Car Coach

The 22983/22984 Indore–Kota Intercity Express is a daily intercity superfast express train which runs between Indore Junction of Madhya Pradesh and Kota Junction of Rajasthan.

== Coach composition ==
The train consists of 15 coaches :

- 1 AC Chair Car
- 4 2nd Seating
- 8 General Unreserved
- 2 Seating cum Luggage Rake

== Service ==
22983/ Kota–Indore Intercity Express has an average speed of 56 km/h and covers 433 km in 7 hrs 45 mins.

The 22984/ Indore–Kota Intercity Express has an average speed of 55 km/h and covers 433 km in 7 hrs 52 mins.

== Route and halts ==
The important halts of the train are:

- Indore Junction
- Dewas Junction
- Maksi Junction
- Shajapur
- Biyavra Rajgarh
- Chachaura Binaganj
- Ruthiyai Junction
- Chhabra Gugor
- Baran
- Antah
- Kota Junction

== Schedule ==
Train number	Station code	Departure station	Departure time	Departure day	Arrival station	Arrival time	Arrival day
22983	KOTA	Kota Junction	06:30 AM	Daily	Indore Junction	14:15 PM	Daily
22984	INDB	Indore Junction	15:35 PM	Daily	Kota Junction	23:27 PM	Daily

== Direction reversal ==
Train reverses its direction at:

- Ruthiyai Junction

== Traction ==
Both trains are hauled by an electric locomotive, Wag - 5 or Wag - 9.
