= Kota–Hazrat Nizamuddin Jan Shatabdi Express =

Jan Shatabdi Express train in India

Kota Junction – Hazrat Nizamuddin Jan Shatabdi Express

Overview
- Service type: Jan Shatabdi Express
- First service: 11 November 2002; 23 years ago
- Current operator: West Central Railways (WCR)

Route
- Termini: Kota Junction (KOTA); Hazrat Nizamuddin (NZM)
- Stops: 8
- Distance travelled: 458 km (285 mi)
- Average journey time: 5 hours, 55 minutes (Up); 6 hours, 10 minutes (Down)
- Service frequency: Daily service
- Train number: 12059 / 12060

On-board services
- Classes: AC Chair Car; 2nd Class seating
- Seating arrangements: Open coach
- Sleeping arrangements: No
- Auto-rack arrangements: No
- Catering facilities: No pantry car attached but available
- Observation facilities: Windows in all carriages
- Entertainment facilities: No
- Baggage facilities: Overhead racks

Technical
- Rolling stock: LHB coach
- Track gauge: 1,676 mm (5 ft 6 in)
- Operating speed: 70 km/h (45 mph) (Average)
Route map
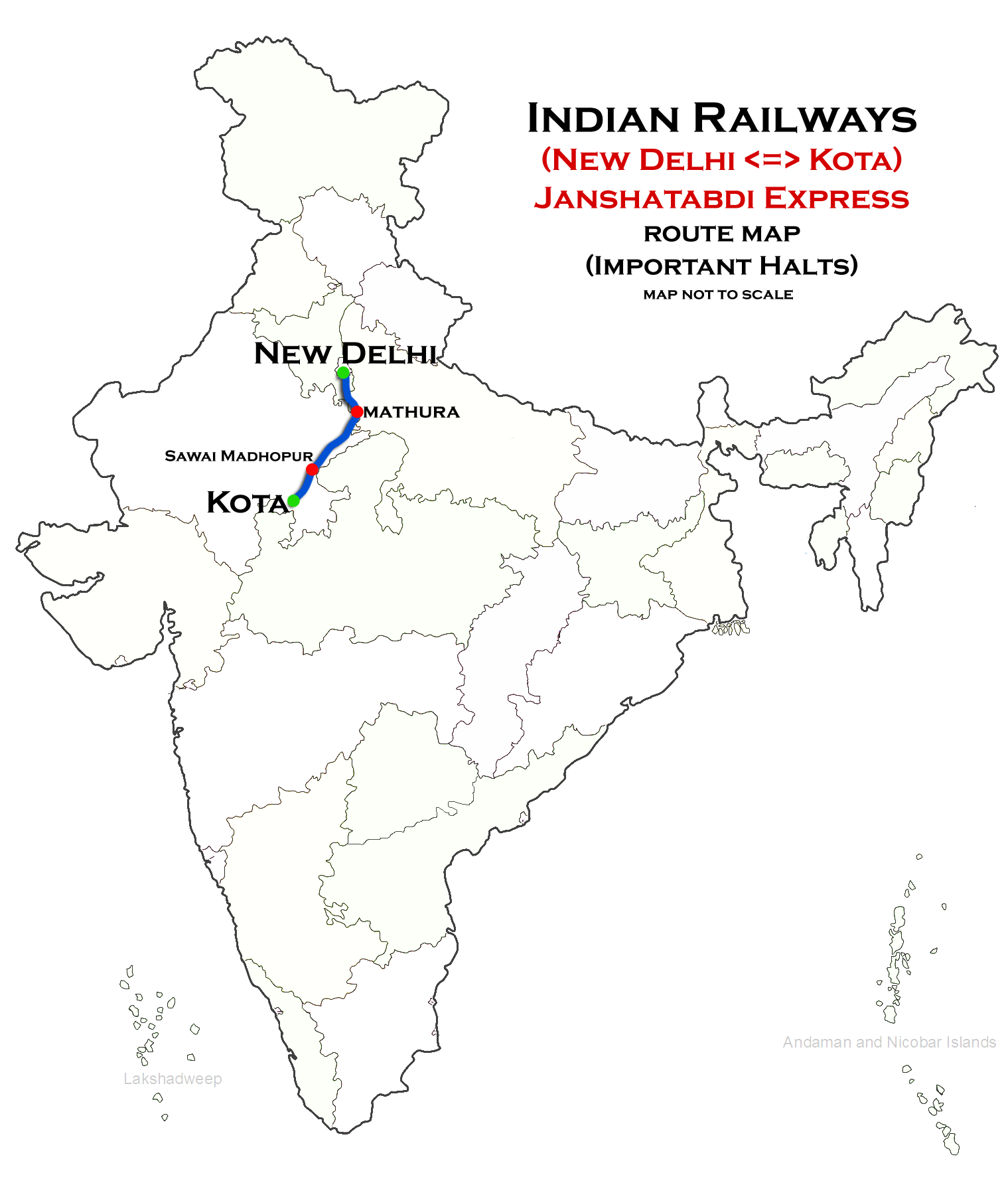
↓ 12059 • 12060 ↑

The Kota–Hazrat Nizamuddin Jan Shatabdi Express is a Superfast Express train of the Jan Shatabdi Express category belonging to West Central Railway zone that runs between Kota Junction and Hazrat Nizamuddin in India.

It covers a distance of approximately 458 km with an average speed of 77 km/h, making it the fastest Jan Shatabdi Express in the Indian Railways.

It operates as train number 12059 from Kota Junction to Hazrat Nizamuddin and as train number 12060 in the reverse direction, serving the states of Rajasthan, Uttar Pradesh, Haryana, and Delhi.

== Stoppage ==
Its stops are Kota Junction, Sawai Madhopur, Gangapur city, Shri Mahabirji, Hindaun City, Bayana, Bharatpur, Mathura, Ballabhgarh and finally Hazrat Nizamuddin.

== Timing ==
It departs from Kota at 6:15 am and reaches Hazrat Nizamuddin at 12:10 pm. On return, it departs Hazrat Nizamuddin at 12:45 pm and reaches Kota at 6.55 pm.

== Traction ==
It is hauled by a Tughlakabad Electric Loco Shed-based WAP-7 locomotive from end to end.
