= Bhawani Mandi =

Town in Jhalawar (Rajasthan), India

- Town
- Location in Rajasthan, India Bhawani Mandi (India) Bhawani Mandi (Asia)
- Coordinates: 24°25′12″N 75°49′47″E
- SDM Headquarter: India
- State: Rajasthan
- District: Jhalawar
- Founder: Bhawani Singh
  - Rank: 1st in jhalawar
- Elevation: 420 m (1,380 ft)

Population (2011)
  - Total: 42,283

Language
  - Official: Hindi
  - Additional official: English
- Time zone: [[UTC+5:30 main Chouraha = Balaji chouraha]] (IST)
- PIN: 326502
- Vehicle registration: RJ17 (Applied in jhalawar dist.)

Bhawani Mandi is a town and a municipality in Jhalawar district in the state of Rajasthan, India.

Bhawani Mandi is also known as "The Orange City of Rajasthan", and there is the second-largest orange market of India after Nagpur.

Bhawani Mandi railway station divided between two states, viz. Madhya Pradesh and Rajasthan. The northern part of the platform is in Mandsaur district of Madhya Pradesh and the southern part is in the Jhalawar district of Rajasthan. It is a border town in Rajasthan. There have been many incidents where criminals took advantage of its location.

== History ==
Bhawanimandi was established by Bhawani Singh in the year 1911, ruler of Jhalawar state when the railway passed through this state. The town was developed when some of the richest families of the region were invited to come and settle here. This turned the ancient garrison into a bustling town and soon it became the principal market town of the south-east region. Not only did the economy boom, Jhalawar also became the first Indian town to have a municipality. This was quite an exceptional characteristic in area that was still in a completely feudal land.

The state patronized music and drama in the early years and the presence of Bhawani Natyashala, a reputed theatre in those times, bears testimony to this fact. Renowned ballet performer the late Uday Shankar hailed from the court of Jhalawar.

== Demographics ==
As of 2001 India census, Bhawani Mandi had a population of 35629. Males constitute 53% of the population and females 47%. Bhawani Mandi has an average literacy rate of 69%, higher than the national average of 59.5%; with male literacy of 78% and female literacy of 58%. 14% of the population is under 6 years of age. Currently, Kailash Bohra is the chairperson.
