= Shri Mahaveerji railway station =

Railway station in Rajasthan, India

Shri Mahaveerji

General information
- Location: Shri Mahaveer Ji, Hindaun, Rajasthan, India
- Coordinates: 26.41°N 76.55°E
- System: Indian Railways station
- Owner: Indian Railways
- Operator: West Central railway
- Line: Delhi–Mumbai
- Platforms: 3
- Tracks: 5
- Connections: Taxi stand, Auto rickshaw stand

Construction
- Structure type: Standard (on ground station)
- Platform levels: 1
- Parking: Available
- Cycle facilities: Available
- Accessible: Yes

Other information
- Status: Functioning
- Station code: SMVJ
- Zone(s): West Central railway
- Division(s): Kota
Location
- Location within Rajasthan Location within India

Shri Mahaveerji (SMVJ) is a railway station on the West Central railway network at Hindaun Tehsil in India. It comes under the Kota railway division of West Central Railway zone. This is a Grade-C station on the Delhi–Mumbai route. It serves Hindaun city. The station consists of three platforms. The station is about 7 Km away from Shri Mahaveer Ji temple.

== Major trains ==
- Indore–New Delhi Intercity Express
- Mewar Express
- Kota–Hazrat Nizamuddin Jan Shatabdi Express
- Agra Fort–Kota Passenger (unreserved)
- Hazrat Nizamuddin–Kota SF Special Fare Special
- Sawai Madhopur Mathura Passenger (unreserved)
- Mathura Sawai Madhopur Passenger (unreserved)
- Avadh Express
- Meerut City–Mandasor Link Express
- Parasnath SF Express
- Firozpur Janta Express
- Mathura Ratlam Passenger (unreserved)
- Haldighati Passenger
- Kota Agra Yamuna Bridge Passenger (unreserved)
- Golden Temple Mail
- Jaipur Bayana Fast Passenger (unreserved)

== See also ==
- Hindaun
- Hindaun City railway station
- Gangapur City railway station
