= Suwasra Assembly constituency =

Constituency of the Madhya Pradesh legislative assembly in India

Coordinates: 24.07°N 75.65°E

Suwasra
- Constituency No. 226 for the Madhya Pradesh Legislative Assembly

Constituency details
- Country: India
- Region: Central India
- State: Madhya Pradesh
- District: Mandsaur
- Lok Sabha constituency: Mandsour
- Established: 1962
- Reservation: None

Member of Legislative Assembly
- 16th Madhya Pradesh Legislative Assembly
- Incumbent Hardeep Singh Dang
- Party: Bharatiya Janata Party
- Elected year: 2023
- Preceded by: Radhe Shyam Patidar

Suwasra Assembly constituency is one of the 230 Vidhan Sabha (Legislative Assembly) constituencies of Madhya Pradesh state in central India. It is part of Mandsaur district.

== Members of Legislative Assembly ==
Election	Name	Party
1962	Champalal Arya	Bharatiya Jana Sangh
1967	Champalal Arya	Bharatiya Jana Sangh
1972	Ramgopal Bhartiya	Indian National Congress
1977	Champalal Arya	Janata Party
1980	Champalal Arya	Bharatiya Janata Party
1985	Asharam Vermai	Indian National Congress
1990	Jagdish Devda	Bharatiya Janata Party
1993	Jagdish Devda	Bharatiya Janata Party
1998	Pushpa Bharatiya	Indian National Congress
2003	Jagdish Devda	Bharatiya Janata Party
2008	Radhe Shyam Patidar	Bharatiya Janata Party
2013	Hardeep Singh Dang	Indian National Congress
2018	Hardeep Singh Dang	Indian National Congress
2020^	Hardeep Singh Dang	Bharatiya Janata Party
2023	Hardeep Singh Dang	Bharatiya Janata Party

^ bypoll

== Election results ==
=== 2023 ===
2023 Madhya Pradesh Legislative Assembly election: Suwasra
Party	Candidate	Votes	%	±%
BJP	Hardeep Singh Dang	124,295	53.06	+8.2
INC	Rakesh Patidar	101,626	43.38	−1.65
ASP(KR)	Prince Suryawanshi	2,805	1.2	
NOTA	None of the above	1,838	0.78	−0.66
Majority		22,669	9.68	+9.51
Turnout		234,275	84.23	+1.68
BJP gain from INC		Swing		

=== 2020 bypoll ===
2020 Madhya Pradesh Legislative Assembly by-elections: Suwasra
Party	Candidate	Votes	%	±%
BJP	Hardeep Singh Dang	117,955	54.45	
INC	Rakesh Patidar	88,515	40.86	
BSP	Shankarlal Chouhan	2,233	1.03	
SS	Sandip Rajguru	2,051	0.95	
NOTA	None of the above	1,769	0.82	
Majority		29,440	13.59	
Turnout		216,634	83.05	
BJP gain from INC		Swing		

=== 2018 ===
2018 Madhya Pradesh Legislative Assembly election: Suwasra
Party	Candidate	Votes	%	±%
INC	Hardeep Singh Dang	93,169	45.03	
BJP	Radheshyam Nanalal Patidar	92,819	44.86	
Independent	Om Singh Bhati	10,273	4.97	
Sapaks Party	Sunil Sharma	2,230	1.08	
NOTA	None of the above	2,976	1.44	
Majority		350	0.17	
Turnout		206,895	82.55	
INC hold		Swing		

=== 2013 ===
2013 Madhya Pradesh Legislative Assembly election: Suwasra
Party	Candidate	Votes	%	±%
INC	Hardeep Singh Dang	87,517	47.46	
BJP	Radheshyam Nanalal Patidar	80392	43.60	
Independent	Manohar Bairagi	3678	1.99	
BSP	Balram Rathor Nai	3310	1.80	N/A
SP	Gopal Suthar	2112	1.15	
Independent	Madanlal Suryawanshi Ranayra	1855	1.01	
Independent	Munna Bhai Kumawat	1421	0.77	
SS	Naharsingh	1089	0.59	
NOTA	None of the Above	3014	1.63	
Majority				
Turnout		184388	80.68	
INC gain from BJP		Swing		

== See also ==
- Suwasra
