= Kotda Bujurg =

Village in Madhya Pradesh, India

Kotda Bujurg is a village situated in the Garoth Tehsil of Mandsaur District in Madhya Pradesh, India. It is situated between multiple mountain ranges and is roughly 91 kilometers east of Mandsaur city. Located in the Ujjain Division, the village is known for its agricultural pursuits and cultural legacy.

== Geographical location ==
The elevation of Kotda Bujurg is 444 meters above sea level. The closest train station is Garoth, which is about 21 kilometers away, and the village is reachable by road from Mandsaur.

== Demographics ==
As of the 2011 census, Kotda Bujurg had a population of 3,745, comprising 1,905 males and 1,840 females. The village exhibits a sex ratio of 966 females per 1,000 males, which is higher than the state average of 931. The literacy rate stands at 64.36%, with male literacy at 80.71% and female literacy at 47.86%.

== Education ==
The village is home to several educational institutions, including:

- MS Kotda Bujurg: An upper primary school offering education from grades 1 to 8.
- PS Kotda Bujurg: A primary school providing education up to grade 5.
- SSM Kotda Bujurg: A private unaided school catering to students from grades 1 to 5.

== Postal services ==
The post office in Kotda Bujurg has its own PIN, which is 458880. The post office provides a variety of services, such as mail delivery, financial services and retail services.

== Local governance ==
Babulal Patidar is the Sarpanch, and the village is run by a Gram Panchayat. The Panchayat ensures the welfare of the people by supervising local development and administration initiatives.

== Nearby villages ==
- Nalkheda
- Kurlasi
- Pawti
- Khajuripanth
- Khajuri Doda

== Economy ==
Agriculture is the primary economic activity in Kotda Bujurg. The land and climate conditions support the growth of agricultural produce, a livelihood sustainer of the village.
