= Chaumahla railway station =

Railway station in Rajasthan, India

Colours of Chaumahla

General information
- Location: Chaumahla, Jhalawar district, Rajasthan; India
- Coordinates: 23.948637°N 75.601312°E
- System: Indian Railways station
- Owner: Indian Railways
- Operator: West Central Railway
- Line: New Delhi–Mumbai main line
- Platforms: 3
- Tracks: 3

Construction
- Structure type: Standard (on-ground station)
- Parking: Yes

Other information
- Status: Functioning
- Station code: CMU
- Zone(s): West Central Railway
- Division(s): Kota
Location
- Location within India

Chaumahla railway station is a railway station in Jhalawar district, Rajasthan. Its code is CMU. It serves Chaumahla town. The station consists of 3 platforms. Passenger, Express, and Superfast trains halt here.
