= Suwasra =

Town in Madhya Pradesh, India

- Town
- Location in Madhya Pradesh, India
- Coordinates: 24.06°N 75.65°E
- Country: India
- State: Madhya Pradesh
- District: Mandsaur District

Government
  - Type: Nagar panchayat

Population (2011)
  - Total: 13,304

Languages
  - Official: Hindi
- PIN: 458888
- Vehicle registration: MP 14

Suwasra is a town and a Nagar Parishad in Mandsaur District of Madhya Pradesh, India. It's also a Tehsil Headquarter And Assembly Constituency.

== Geography ==
Suwasra is located at 24.06°N 75.65°E. It has an average elevation of 508 m (1,667 ft).

== Demographics ==
Suwasara town has population of 13,304 of which 6,754 are males while 6,550 are females as Census India 2011. The literacy rate of Suwasara city is 79.61% – higher than state average of 69.32%.

== See also ==
- Mandsaur District
- Suwasra railway station
- Suwasra Assembly constituency
