= Songari, Mandsaur =

Village in Madhya Pradesh, India

Coordinates: 20°33′N 77°02′E

Songari is a village in the Mandsaur district of the Indian state Madhya Pradesh. Renowned International artist Wajid Khan hails from the same village.
