= Baran railway station =

Railway Station in Rajasthan, India

Baran

General information
- Location: Baran, Baran district, Rajasthan; India
- Coordinates: 25.095057°N 76.506930°E
- Elevation: 264 metres (866 ft)
- System: Indian Railways station
- Owner: Indian Railways
- Operator: West Central Railway
- Line: Kota–Ruthiyai line
- Platforms: 3
- Tracks: 3

Construction
- Structure type: Standard (on ground station)
- Parking: Yes

Other information
- Status: Functioning
- Station code: BAZ
- Zone(s): West Central Railway
- Division(s): Kota
Location
- Location within India Location within Rajasthan

Baran railway station is a railway station in Baran district, Rajasthan. Its code is BAZ. It serves Baran city. The station consists of 3 platforms. Passenger, Express, and Superfast trains halt here. Some important trains are as: 14813/14 Bhopal-Jodhpur Passenger Express, 19811/12 Kota-Etawah Express, 22983/84 Indore-Kota Intercity Express, 12181/82 Jabalpur-Ajmer Dayodaya Express, 11603/04 Kota-Bina MEMU Train etc.
