= Bhawani Mandi railway station =

Railway Station in Rajasthan, India

Bhawani Mandi

General information
- Location: Bhawani Mandi, Jhalawar district, Rajasthan; India
- Coordinates: 24.419287°N 75.830242°E
- Elevation: 383 metres (1,257 ft)
- System: Indian Railways station
- Owner: Indian Railways
- Operator: West Central Railway
- Line: New Delhi–Mumbai main line
- Platforms: 3
- Tracks: 3

Construction
- Structure type: Standard (on-ground station)
- Parking: Yes

Other information
- Status: Functioning
- Station code: BWM
- Zone(s): West Central Railway
- Division(s): Kota
Location
- Location within India Location within Rajasthan

Bhawani Mandi railway station is a railway station serving Bhawani Mandi town, a border town in Jhalawar district of Rajasthan State of India. It is under Kota railway division of West Central Railway Zone of Indian Railways.

The Bhawani Mandi railway station is divided between two states, viz. Madhya Pradesh and Rajasthan. Northern part of the platform is in Mandsaur district of Madhya Pradesh and Southern part is in Jhalawar district of Rajasthan.

It is located at 383 m above sea level and has two platforms. As of 2016, electrified of existing double broad-gauge railway line exist and at this station, 50 trains stops. Kota Airport, is at distance of 87 kilometers.
