= Shri Mahaveer Ji (town) =

Shri Mahaveer Ji Mahavirji
- Town
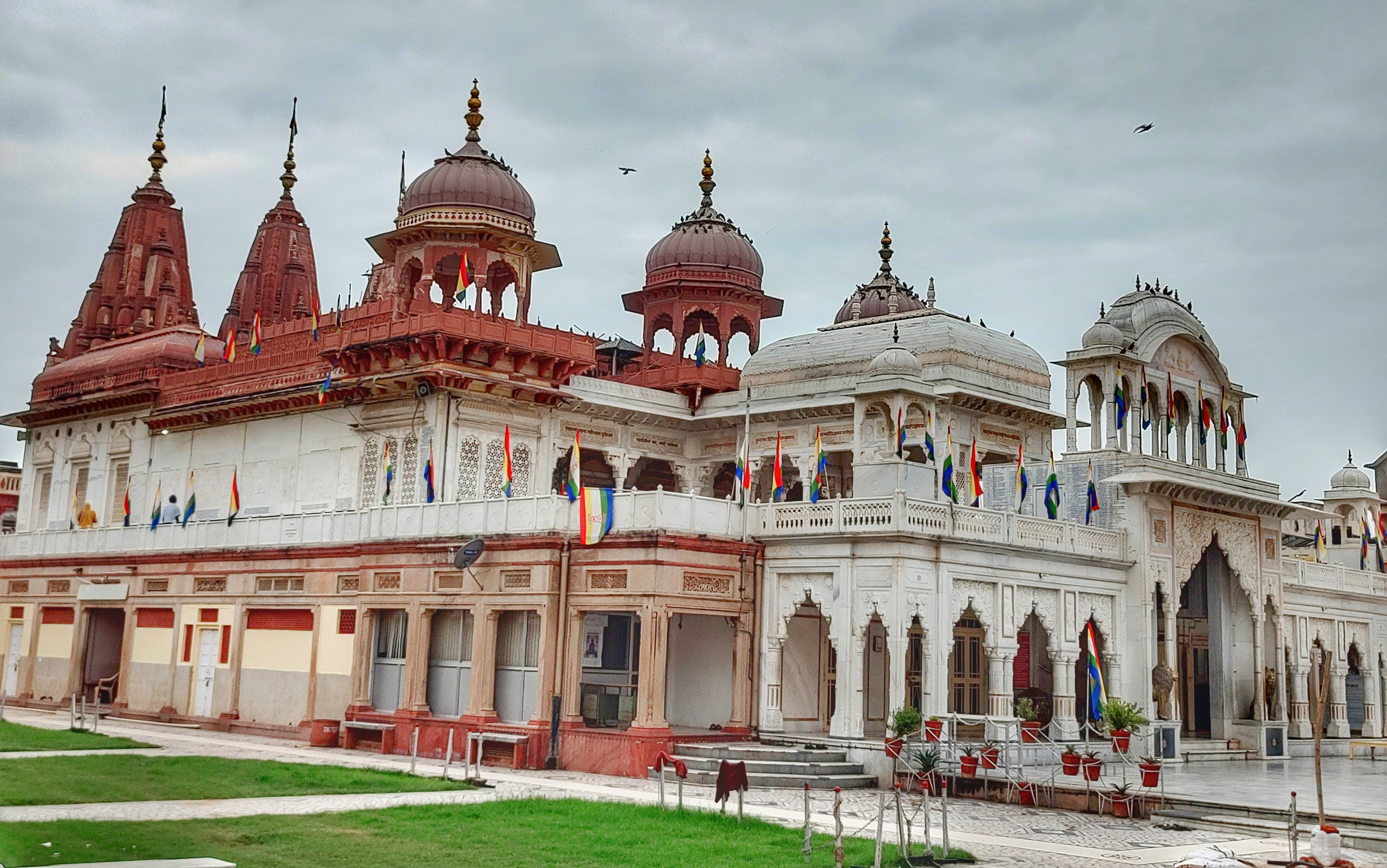
- Shri Mahaveer Ji temple

- Location in Rajasthan, India Shri Mahaveer Ji (India)
- Coordinates: 26°41′N 76°55′E
- Country: India
- State: Rajasthan
- District: Karauli
- Subdistrict: Hindaun Subdistrict

Government
  - Lok Sabha constituency: Karauli-Dholpur (Lok Sabha constituency)
  - MP: Manoj Rajoria
  - Assembly constituency: Hindaun (Rajasthan Assembly constituency)
  - MLA: Bharosi Lal Jatav (Indian National Congress)

Area
  - Total: 15 km^{2} (5.8 sq mi)
- Elevation: 235 m (771 ft)

Population (2011)
  - Total: 20,000
- Area code: 322220
- Vehicle registration: RJ 34
- Sex ratio: 1000:877 ♂/♀

Shri Mahaveer Ji is a town and tehsil headquarter in Hindaun Block, Karauli District, Rajasthan. Approximately 20,000 people live there, and Many villages come within its area. A hydrological station is installed at the town.

== Jain temple ==
Shri Mahavir Ji is a Jain pilgrimage site. There are five temples: Digambar Jain Atishaya Kshetra Shri Mahavirji, Shantinath Jinalaya, Bhagwan Parshvanath Jinalaya, Kirti Ashram Chaityalaya, and Bhavya Kamal Mandir. Digambar Jain Atishaya Kshetra Shri Mahavirji is the main temple of this town the iconic idol of Lord Mahavira, the principal deity of the pilgrimage temple, was found during an excavation around 200 years.

Every year a fair is organized on Mahaveer Jayanti.

== See also ==
- Shri Mahaveerji railway station
