= Hardeep Singh Dang =

Indian politician

Member of the Madhya Pradesh Legislative Assembly
- Incumbent
- Assumed office 2020
- Preceded by: Radheshyam patidar
- Constituency: Suwasra

Personal details
- Party: Bharatiya Janata Party
- Profession: Politician
- As of 13 June, 2018

Hardeep Singh Dang is a member of the Madhya Pradesh Legislative Assembly representing the Suwasra constituency. He is a member of the Bharatiya Janata Party. On 2 July 2020, he was sworn in as a cabinet minister in the Madhya Pradesh government led by Chief Minister Shivraj Singh Chouhan.

He resigned from the assembly membership and, subsequently, from the Indian National Congress, citing 'ignorance from his party' in a letter. He then joined the BJP on 21 March 2020, along with 17 supporters of Jyotiraditya Scindia and four others.

== See also ==
- Madhya Pradesh Congress Committee
