= Lokmanya Tilak Terminus–Prayagraj Amrit Bharat Express =

Amrit Bharat Express train route in India

Mumbai LTT – Prayagraj Amrit Bharat Express

Overview
- Service type: Amrit Bharat Express, Superfast
- Status: Active
- Locale: Maharashtra, Madhya Pradesh and Uttar Pradesh
- First service: 21 August 2026; 2 months ago (Inaugural); 22 August 2026; 2 months ago (Commercial)
- Current operator: North Central Railways (NCR)

Route
- Termini: Lokmanya Tilak Terminus (LTT); Prayagraj Junction (PRYJ)
- Stops: 7
- Distance travelled: 1,342 km (834 mi)
- Average journey time: 19 hrs 20 mins
- Service frequency: Weekly
- Train number: 20435/20436
- Lines used: Lokmanya Tilak Terminus–Kalyan line; Kalyan–Bhusaval line; Itarsi–Jabalpur line; Satna–Prayagraj line

On-board services
- Classes: Sleeper class coach (SL); General unreserved coach (GS)
- Seating arrangements: Yes
- Sleeping arrangements: Yes
- Auto-rack arrangements: Upper
- Catering facilities: No
- Observation facilities: Saffron-grey
- Entertainment facilities: Electric outlets; Reading lights; Bottle holder
- Other facilities: CCTV cameras; Bio-vacuum toilets; Foot-operated water taps; Passenger information system

Technical
- Rolling stock: Modified LHB coaches
- Track gauge: Indian gauge
- Electrification: 25 kV 50 Hz AC overhead line
- Operating speed: 69 km (43 mi) (Avg.)
- Track owner: Indian Railways
- Rake sharing: Yes
Route map
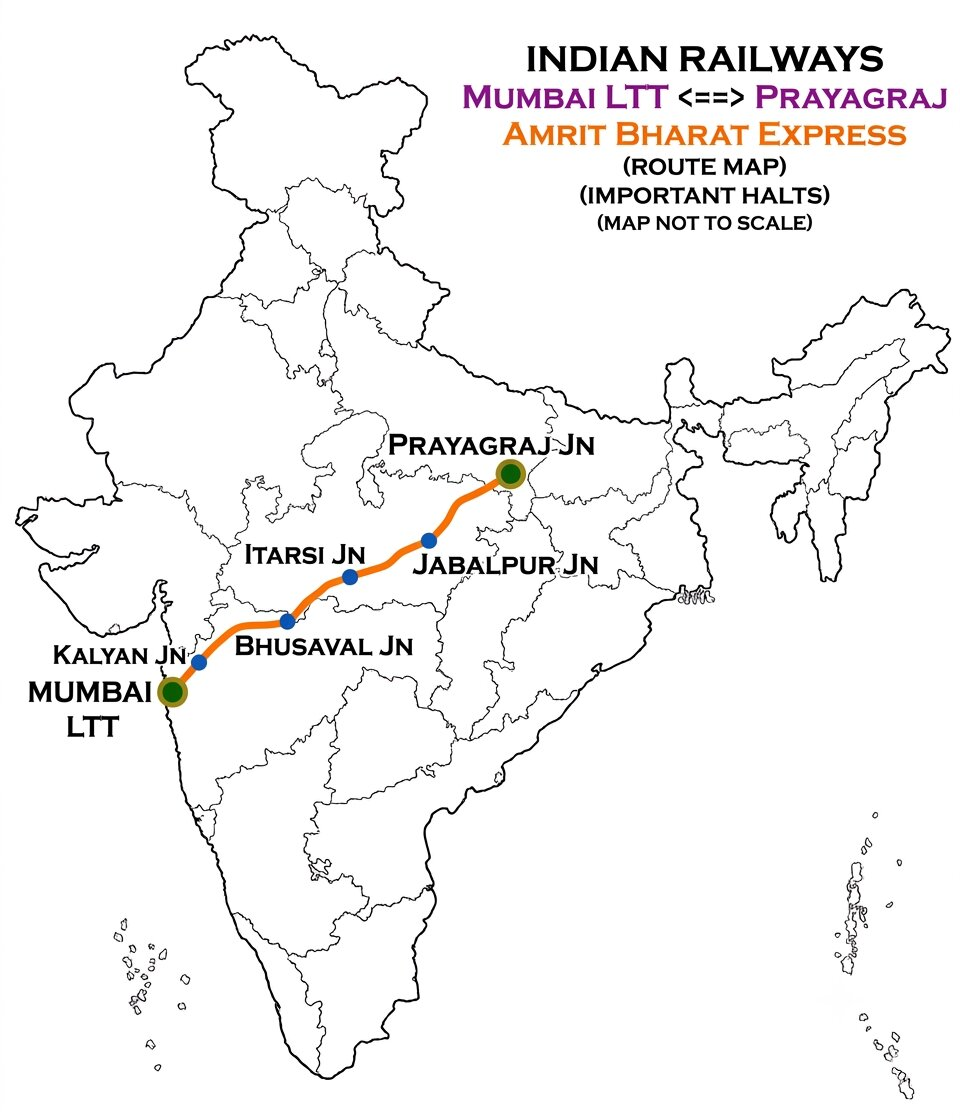

The 20435/20436 Mumbai LTT–Prayagraj Amrit Bharat Express is India's 37th Non-AC Superfast Amrit Bharat Express train, which runs across the states of Maharashtra, Madhya Pradesh and Uttar Pradesh by connecting Lokmanya Tilak Terminus of Mumbai, the financial capital of Maharashtra with Prayagraj Junction of Prayagraj, the Holy Sangam city in Uttar Pradesh.

The express train is inaugurated on 2026 by Honorable Prime Minister Narendra Modi through video conference.

== Overview ==
The train is operated by Indian Railways, connecting Lokmanya Tilak Terminus and Prayagraj Junction. It is currently operated 20435/20436 on weekly basis.

== Rakes ==
It is the 37th Amrit Bharat 2.0 Express train in which the locomotives were designed by Chittaranjan Locomotive Works (CLW) at Chittaranjan, West Bengal and the coaches were designed and manufactured by the Integral Coach Factory at Perambur, Chennai under the Make in India Initiative.

== Schedule ==
Train Schedule: Mumbai LTT↔ Prayagraj Amrit Bharat Express
Train No.	Station Code	Departure Station	Departure Time	Departure Day	Arrival Station	Arrival Hours
20435	LTT	Lokmanya Tilak Terminus	05:20 PM	Prayagraj Junction	12:40 PM	19h 20m
20436	PRYJ	Prayagraj Junction	06:10 PM	Lokmanya Tilak Terminus	03:45 PM	21h 35m

== Routes and halts ==
The important halts of the train are :

- Lokmanya Tilak Terminus
- Kalyan Junction
- Bhusaval Junction
- Itarsi Junction
- Jabalpur Junction
- Satna Junction
- Prayagraj Junction

== Rake reversal or rake share ==
The rake sharing with Prayagraj–Udhna (Surat) Amrit Bharat Express (20437/20438).

== See also ==
- Amrit Bharat Express
- Vande Bharat Sleeper Express
- Vande Bharat Express
- Uday Express
- Humsafar Express

== Notes ==
a. Runs a day in a week with both directions.
