= Narayanpur Tatwara railway station =

Railway station in Rajasthan, India

Narayanpur Tatwara

General information
- Location: Narayanpur Tatwara, Sawai Madhopur district, Rajasthan; India
- Coordinates: 26.344144°N 76.635535°E
- Elevation: 249 metres (817 ft)
- System: Indian Railways station
- Owner: Indian Railways
- Operator: West Central Railway
- Line: New Delhi–Mumbai main line
- Platforms: 2
- Tracks: 2

Construction
- Structure type: Standard (on ground station)
- Parking: Yes

Other information
- Status: Functioning
- Station code: NNW
- Zone(s): West Central Railway
- Division(s): Kota
Location
- Location within India Location within Rajasthan

Narayanpur Tatwara railway station is a railway station in Sawai Madhopur district, Rajasthan. Its code is NNW. It serves Narayanpur Tatwara. The station consists of 2 platforms. Passenger and Express trains halt here.
