= Piplya Mandi =

Piplia Mandi Piplia Mandi, Piplia station, Pipliya
- Town
- Location in Madhya Pradesh, India Piplia Mandi (India)
- Coordinates: 24°12′10″N 75°0′27″E
- Country: India
- State: Madhya Pradesh
- District: Mandsaur

Population (2016)
  - Total: 17,990

Languages
  - Official: Hindi
- Time zone: UTC+5:30 (IST)
- ISO 3166 code: IN-MP
- Vehicle registration: MP
- Website: http://www.pipliamandi.com/

Piplia Mandi is a town and a Nagar Parishad in Mandsaur district in the Indian state of Madhya Pradesh. It is15 km away from the city of Mandsaur on state highway 31.

== Demographics ==
As of 2001 India census, Piplia Mandi had a population of 16,703. Males constitute 51% of the population and females 49%. Piplia Mandi has an average literacy rate of 70%, higher than the national average of 59.5%: male literacy is 78%, and female literacy is 61%. In Piplia Mandi, 15% of the population is under 6 years of age.
