= New Kota railway station =

Railway station in Rajasthan, India

New Kota

General information
- Location: Kota, Kota district, Rajasthan; India
- Coordinates: 25.144234°N 75.865739°E
- System: Indian Railways station
- Owner: Indian Railways
- Operator: West Central Railway
- Line: New Delhi–Mumbai main line
- Platforms: 2
- Tracks: 2

Construction
- Structure type: Standard (on-ground station)
- Parking: Yes

Other information
- Status: Functioning
- Station code: NKOT
- Zone(s): West Central Railway
- Division(s): Kota
Location
- Location within India Location within Rajasthan

New Kota Railway Station, formerly known as Dakaniya Talav railway station, is a suburban railway station in Kota city, Rajasthan. Its code is NKOT. It serves the Kota Industrial Area and the coaching hub of Kota city. The station currently consists of 2 platforms. Passenger, Express, and Superfast trains halt here.

== Background ==
New Kota, located on the Delhi-Mumbai rail line, approximately 9 kilometers from Kota Junction, is being developed to decongest the Kota Junction railway station, an important station on the New Delhi–Mumbai main line and the main railway station serving the city of Kota. The station is experiencing rapid growth in passenger traffic due to its proximity to the educational coaching hub. Kota city is also served by another railway substation called Sogaria railway station (SGAC)

== Further Development ==
A significant redevelopment project, with an investment of about ₹132.20 crores, is currently underway to modernise the station. Upon completion, the station will boast world-class amenities, including a loop line, a new concourse, an enhanced circulating area and parking, lifts, escalators, a solar power plant, digital displays, CCTV surveillance, and coach and train indication boards.

A new 36-meter-wide concourse will connect all platforms, enhancing passenger flow. The station will be having 4 platforms post redevelopment. The redevelopment project commenced in November 2022 and has surpassed 83 per cent completion.
