= Ranthambore railway station =

Railway station in Rajasthan, India

General information
- Location: Ranthambore, Rajasthan; India
- Elevation: 248 metres (814 ft)
- System: Indian Railways station
- Owner: Indian Railways
- Operator: West Central Railway
- Line: New Delhi–Mumbai main line
- Platforms: 2
- Tracks: 3

Construction
- Structure type: Standard (on-ground station)
- Parking: No
- Cycle facilities: No

Other information
- Status: Double electric line
- Station code: RNT
- Zone(s): West Central Railway
- Division(s): Kota
Location

Ranthambore railway station is a small railway station in Sawai Madhopur district, Rajasthan. Its code is RNT.

The station consists of two platforms. These platforms lack many facilities, including water and sanitation.

RNT is part of Kota railway division of West Central Railway zone, and has been classified under "D" category.

== See also ==
- Ranthambore National Park
- Ranthambore Fort
- Sawai Madhopur Junction railway station
- Rajiv Gandhi Regional Museum of Natural History
- Shilpgram, Sawai Madhopur
