= Jawad Road railway station =

Railway station in Madhya Pradesh

General information
- Location: National Highway 156, Madhya Pradesh; India
- Coordinates: 24.5584°N 74.7649°E
- Elevation: 462 metres (1,516 ft)
- System: Indian Railways station
- Owner: Indian Railways
- Operator: Western Railway
- Platforms: 2
- Tracks: 4 (single diesel broad gauge)
- Connections: Auto stand

Construction
- Structure type: Standard (on-ground station)
- Parking: No
- Cycle facilities: No

Other information
- Status: Functioning
- Station code: JWO
- Zone(s): Western Railway
- Division(s): Ratlam
Location

Jawad Road railway station is a small railway station in Neemuch district, Madhya Pradesh. Its code is JWO. It serves Jawad city. The station consists of two platforms, which are well sheltered and facilities including water, sanitation and waiting area is also available.

== Major trains ==
- Udaipur City–Ratlam Express (unreserved)
- Kota–Nimach Passenger (unreserved)
- Bhilwara–Ratlam DMU
- Nimach–Udaipur Passenger (unreserved)
- Ratlam–Ajmer Express
- Haldighati Passenger
- Veer Bhumi Chittaurgarh Express
