= Kapren =

Kapren Narsingh nagri
- city
- Location in Rajasthan, India Kapren (India)
- Coordinates: 25.4038°N 76.0745°E
- Country: India
- State: Rajasthan
- District: Bundi

Government
  - Body: Nagarpalika, kapren

Population (2011)
  - Total: 20,748

Languages
  - Official: Hadoti & Hindi
- Time zone: UTC+5:30 (IST)
- Vehicle registration: RJ08

Kapren is a city and a municipality in Bundi district in the Indian state of Rajasthan.

== Demographics ==
Kapren is a city in district of Bundi, Rajasthan. The Kapren city is divided into 25 wards for which elections are held every 5 years. The Kapren Municipality has population of 20,748 of which 10,758 are males while 9,990 are females as per report released by Census India 2011. In the 2026 municipality elections, the BJP and the Congress won 11 wards each with others taking three wards. It has a police station. The population of children aged 0-6 is 2748 which is 13.24% of total population of Kaprain (M). In Kapren Municipality, the female sex ratio is 929 against state average of 928. Moreover, the child sex ratio in Kapren is around 882 compared to Rajasthan state average of 888. The literacy rate of Kapren city is 73.45% higher than the state average of 66.11%. In Kapren, male literacy is around 85.86% while the female literacy rate is 60.19%.

== Climate ==
The prevailing climate in Kapren is known as a local steppe climate. During the year there is little rainfall. The average annual temperature is 26.6 °C in Kapren. In a year, the average rainfall is 724 mm.

The driest month is February. There is 1 mm of precipitation in February. Most of the precipitation here falls in August, averaging 265 mm.

With an average of 35.6 °C, May is the warmest month. January is the coldest month, with temperatures averaging 17.1 °C.
