= Garoth =

- Town
- Location in Madhya Pradesh, India
- Coordinates: 24°19′29″N 75°39′7″E
- Country: India
- State: Madhya Pradesh
- District: Mandsaur

Area
  - Total: 120 km^{2} (46 sq mi)

Population (2012)
  - Total: 15,122
  - Density: 130/km^{2} (330/sq mi)

Languages
  - Official: Hindi
- Time zone: UTC+5:30 (IST)
- PIN: 458880
- Telephone code: 07425
- Vehicle registration: M.P-14
- Sex ratio: 51% Male 49% Female ♂/♀
- Literacy: 87.38%%

Garoth is a city in Madhya Pradesh state in central India. It is one of the tehsil. It shares boundary with Jhalawar district of Rajasthan. The local language or dialect spoken here is a mixture of the Mewari, Harauti, and Malwi Languages.

Garoth is the main junction of delhi Mumbai expressway and ujjain garoth highway.

Garoth is a city situated near Gandhi Sagar Lake, in northern Madhya Pradesh, India.

The town is very famous for its Garba dance. The Garba performed here attracts the audience, the reason behind this is the competition between all the Garba teams here and the winning team are given prizes. The popularity of Garba here can be gauged from the fact that Garba starts here at 8 pm and continues till 3-4 am and even on the day of Navami, it goes on till 6 a.m. This city is also famous for its setting, views, Hinduism culture and friendly opened people. The city is an agricultural spot, as well as a small educational center, where a high school and a college can be found.

== Demographics ==
The town has an area of 9,791 km^{2}. The district is bounded by Neemuch District to the north, Rajasthan state to the east and west and It is part of Ujjain Division

Garoth forms the northern projection of Madhya Pradesh from its western Division, i.e., Ujjain Commissioner's Division

As of the 2011 Census of India, Garoth had a population of 1,89,729. Males constitute 51% of the population and females 49%. Garoth has an average literacy rate of 63%, higher than the national average of 59.5%: male literacy is 76%, and female literacy is 50%. In Garoth, 15% of the population is under 6 years of age.

== Gandhi Sagar dam ==
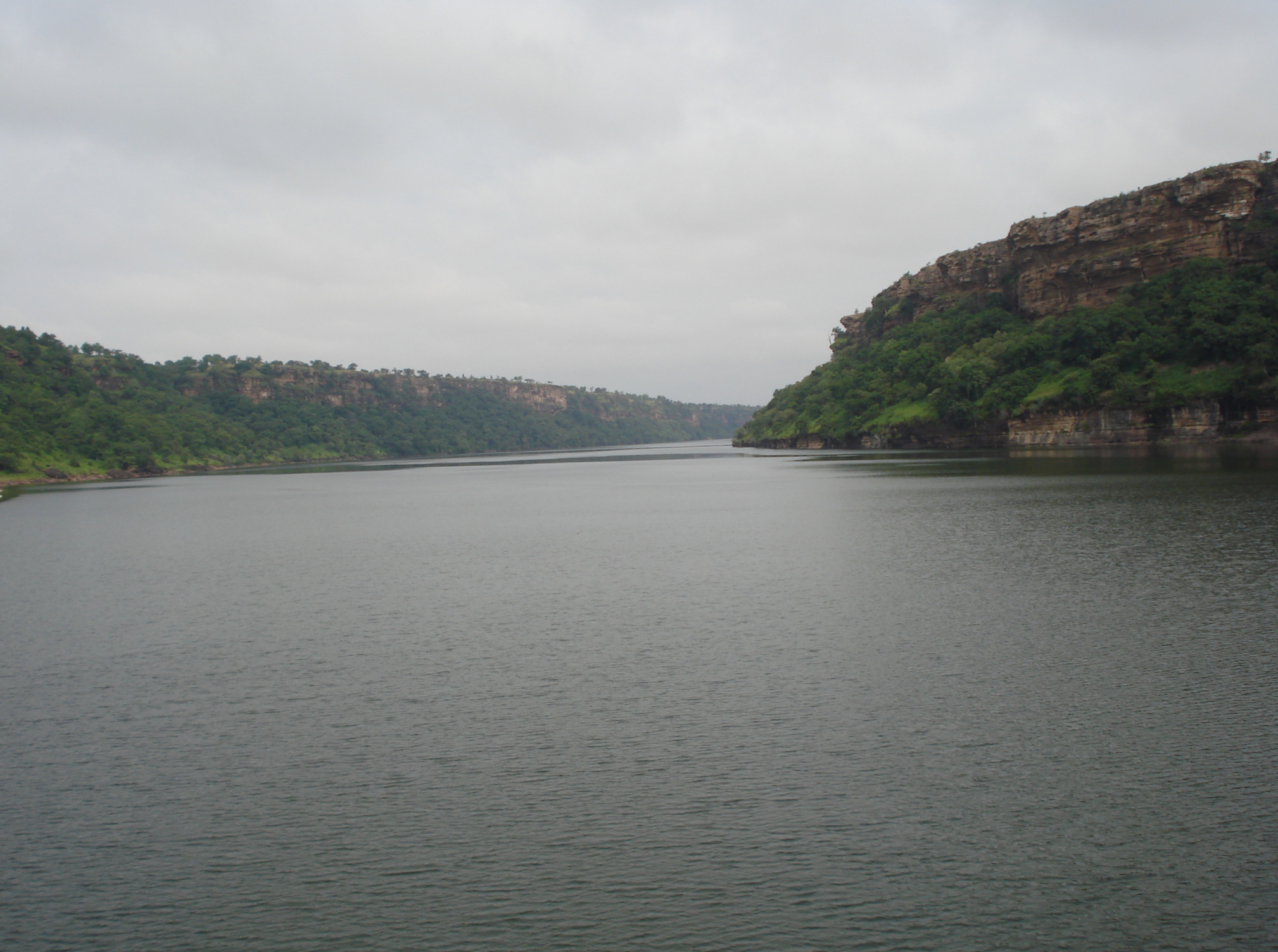

Gandhisagar Dam is situated at a distance of 42 km. from the city headquarter. The Dam is constructed on the Chambal River.
