= Chhabra Gugor railway station =

Railway station in Rajasthan, India

Chhabra Gugor

General information
- Location: Chhabra, Baran district, Rajasthan; India
- Coordinates: 24.679766°N 76.851546°E
- Elevation: 345 metres (1,132 ft)
- System: Indian Railways station
- Owner: Indian Railways
- Operator: West Central Railway
- Line: Kota–Ruthiyai line
- Platforms: 2
- Tracks: 3

Construction
- Structure type: Standard (on ground station)
- Parking: Yes

Other information
- Status: Functioning
- Station code: CAG
- Zone(s): West Central Railway
- Division(s): Kota
Location
- Location within India Location within Rajasthan

Chhabra Gugor railway station is a railway station in Baran district, Rajasthan. Its code is CAG. It serves Chhabra city. The station consists of 2 platforms. Passenger, Express, and Superfast trains halt here.
