= Malhargarh =

- Town
- Location in Madhya Pradesh, India Malhargarh (India)
- Coordinates: 24.28°N 74.98°E
- Country: India
- State: Madhya Pradesh
- District: Mandsaur
- Founder: Malhar Rao Holkar
- Elevation: 458 m (1,503 ft)

Population (2001)
  - Total: 7,349

Languages
  - Official: Hindi
- Time zone: UTC+5:30 (IST)
- ISO 3166 code: IN-MP
- Vehicle registration: MP

Malhargarh is a town (a nagar parishad) and a tehsil in Mandsaur district in the Indian state of Madhya Pradesh. It is located between Neemuch and Mandsaur on the Ratlam- Chittaurgarh Section of Indian railway. Malhargarh is rich in agriculture and part of the Malwa region.

== Demographics ==
As of 2001 India census, Malhargarh had a population of 12,000. Males constitute 51% of the population and females 49%. Malhargarh has an average literacy rate of 73%, higher than the national average of 59.55%: male literacy is 81%, and female literacy is 64%. In Malhargarh, 14% of the population is under 6 years of age.
