= Zamania railway station =

Railway station in Uttar Pradesh, India

Zamania Railway Station Jamdagni Puri
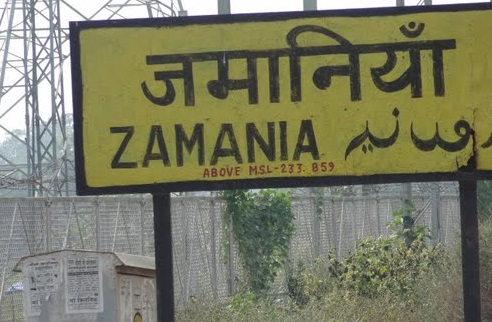

General information
- Location: Zamania, Ghazipur district, Uttar Pradesh; India
- Coordinates: 25°26′00″N 83°34′00″E
- Elevation: 76 metres (249 ft)
- Owner: Railway Ministry of India
- Operator: East Central Railway
- Line: 2 Waiting Line
- Platforms: 2
- Tracks: 2
- Connections: Rail Wire (Protect By Google)

Construction
- Structure type: Standard (on ground station)
- Parking: Yes

Other information
- Status: Functioning
- Station code: ZNA
- Zone(s): East Central Railway
- Division(s): DNR

History
- Opened: 1894
- Closed: No
- Rebuilt: Yes ((2017–2018))
- Electrified: Yes (2010–2012)

Passengers
- Daily: 99 thousand per week
Location
- Location within India Location within Uttar Pradesh

Zamania railway station (station code ZNA) is an important railway station located in Zamania, Ghazipur district in the Indian state of Uttar Pradesh.

== Trains ==
1. 13007/08 Howrah-Sriganganagar-Howarh Udyan Abha Toofan Express 2. 13133/34 Varanasi-Sealdah UpperIndia Express (Varanasi Express) 3. 20801/02 Islampur-NewDelhi Magadh Superfast Express 4. 12141/42 Mumbai LTT-Patliputra Superfast Express 5. 13237/38 Patna–Kota Express(Via-Ayodhya Cantt) 6. 13119/20 Sealdah-Old Delhi Upper India Express 7. 13413/14 Malda Town-Old Delhi Farakka Express (via Sultanpur) 8. 13483/84 Malda Town-Old Delhi Farakka Express 9. 13239/40 Patna-Kota Express (Via-Sultanpur) 10. 12333/34 Howrah-Prayagraj Rambagh Vibhuti Superfast Express 11. 13005/06 Howrah-Amritsar Mail(Punjab Mail) 12. 13049/50 Howrah-Amritsar Express (Banaras Express) 13. 13201/02 Patna-Mumbai LTT Janta Express 14.

== See also ==
- Northern Railway zone
- Babrala
