= Shampura =

- Village
- Country: India
- State: Punjab
- District: Gurdaspur
- Tehsil: Dera Baba Nanak
- Region: Majha

Government
  - Type: Panchayat raj
  - Body: Gram panchayat

Area
  - Total: 535 ha (1,320 acres)

Population (2011)
  - Total: 1,582; 828/754 ♂/♀
  - Scheduled Castes: 544; 279/265 ♂/♀
  - Total Households: 320

Languages
  - Official: Punjabi
- Time zone: UTC+5:30 (IST)
- Telephone: 01871
- ISO 3166 code: IN-PB
- Website: gurdaspur.nic.in

Shampura is a village in Dera Baba Nanak in Gurdaspur district of Punjab State, India. It is located 12 kilometres (7.5 mi) from sub district headquarter and 48 kilometres (30 mi) from district headquarter. The village is administrated by Sarpanch an elected representative of the village.

== Demography ==
As of 2011, the village has a total number of 320 houses and a population of 1582, of which 828 are males and 754 are females. According to the report published by Census India in 2011, out of the total population of the village 544 people are from Schedule Caste and the village does not have any Schedule Tribe population so far.

== See also ==
- List of villages in India
