= Bundi railway station =

Railway Station in Rajasthan, India

Bundi
- Indian Railways logo

General information
- Location: NH-52 bypass, Bundi, Rajasthan; India
- Coordinates: 25.4086°N 75.6510°E
- Elevation: 255 metres (837 ft)
- Owner: Indian Railways
- Operator: West Central Railways
- Line: Kota–Chittorgarh section
- Platforms: 2
- Tracks: 3

Construction
- Structure type: Standard on ground
- Parking: Yes
- Cycle facilities: Yes
- Accessible: Available

Other information
- Status: Functional
- Station code: BUDI
- Zone(s): West Central Railway zone
- Division(s): Kota
Location
- Location within Rajasthan Location within India

Bundi railway station (station code:- BUDI) is a railway station serving Bundi town, in Bundi district of Rajasthan State of India. It is under Kota railway division of West Central Railway Zone of Indian Railways. It is located on Kota–Chittorgarh line of the Indian Railways.

Bundi railway station was redeveloped under the Amrit Bharat Station Scheme and inaugurated on 22 May 2025 with upgraded passenger accessibility facilities and expanded train connectivity, including Vande Bharat Express halts.

== Administration ==
The station is under Kota railway division, which is a part of West Central Railway zone in Indian Railways.

== Infrastructure ==
It is located at 255 m (837 ft) above sea level and has two platforms.

== Location ==
Bundi town is located 35 km (22 mi) from Kota and 210 km (130 mi) from Jaipur. Kota Airport is at distance of 35 km (22 mi).
