= Indragarh Sumerganj Mandi railway station =

Railway station in Rajasthan, India

Indragarh Sumerganj Mandi

General information
- Location: Indragarh Sumerganj Mandi, Bundi district, Rajasthan; India
- Coordinates: 25.728154°N 76.232934°E
- System: Indian Railways station
- Owner: Indian Railways
- Operator: West Central Railway
- Line: New Delhi–Mumbai main line
- Platforms: 2
- Tracks: 2

Construction
- Structure type: Standard (on-ground station)
- Parking: Yes

Other information
- Status: Functioning
- Station code: IDG
- Zone(s): West Central Railway
- Division(s): Kota
Location
- Location within India Location within Rajasthan

Indragarh Sumerganj Mandi railway station is a railway station in Bundi district, Rajasthan. Its code is IDG. It serves Indragarh and Sumerganj Mandi. The station consists of 2 platforms. Passenger, Express, and Superfast trains halt here.
