= Daloda =

Dalauda, Daloda
- Tehsil Town
- Location in Madhya Pradesh Dalauda, Daloda (India)
- Coordinates: 23.952734°N 75.101187°E
- Country: India
- State: Madhya Pradesh
- District: Mandsaur district

Government
  - Type: Janpad Panchayat
  - Body: Council

Population
  - Total: 8,854 ( Dalauda choupati) 2,063 (Dalauda Rail)

Languages
  - Official: Hindi
- Time zone: UTC+5:30 (IST)
- ISO 3166 code: MP-IN

Daolda or Dalauda is a town and a tehsil in Mandsaur district, Madhya Pradesh, India. Out of 8 tehsils Dalauda is also a part of Mandsaur district . Dalauda currently operates under janpad panchayat government, but recently announced that Dalauda nagar parishad will be declared soon. This will be a part of Dalauda Choupati and Dalauda Rail, both in the soon-to-be Dalauda nagar parishad.

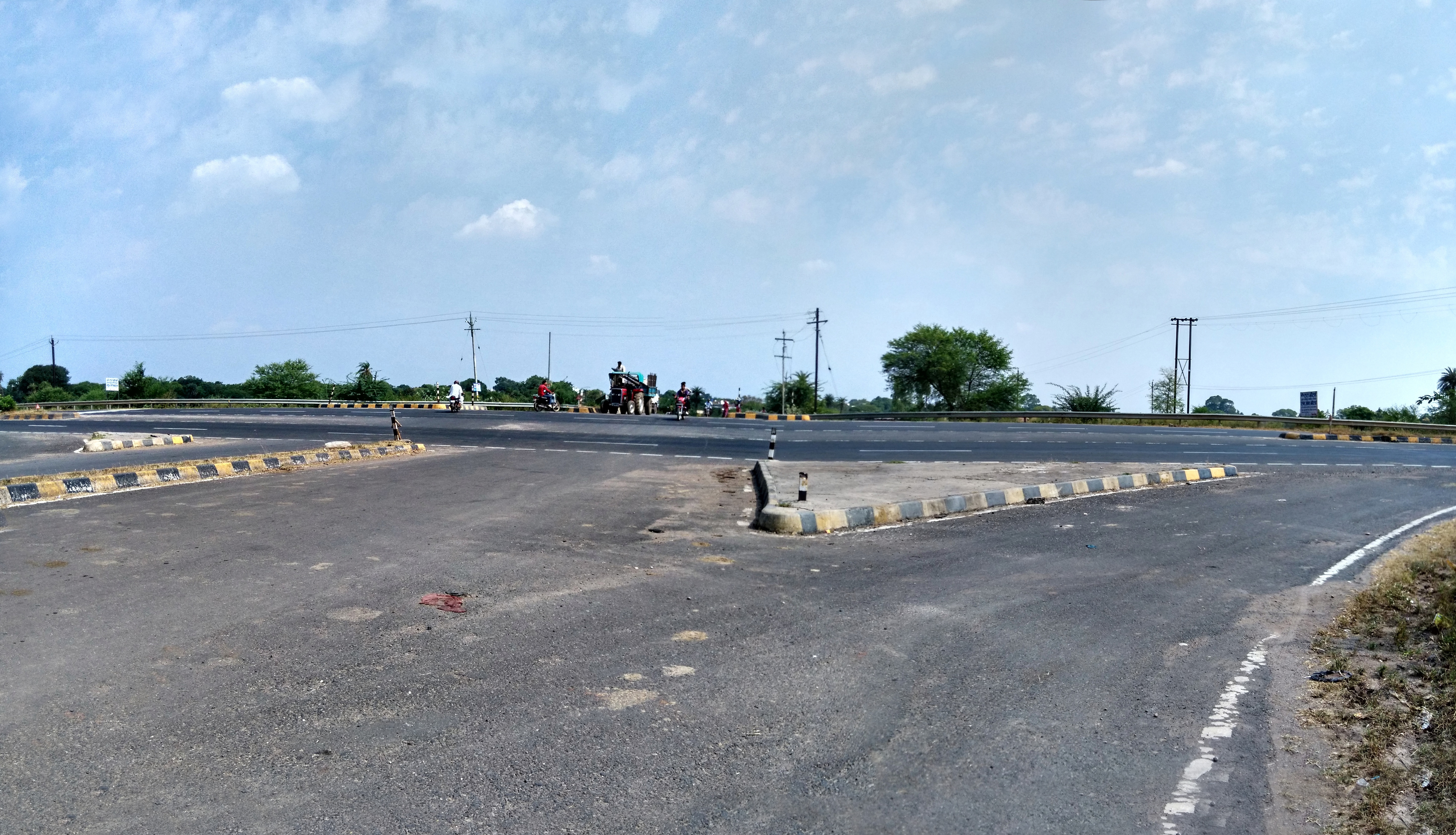
Dalauda Jaora Main Road

== Geography ==
Dalauda is located on 23.952734°N 75.101187°E It has an average elevation of 508 metres (1,669 feet). It is 190 km from Indore.

== Demographics ==
The Dalouda Choupati has a population of 8,854 of which 4,478 are males while 4,376 are females as per Census 2011 with a total of 1,912 families residing.

== Transportation ==
Dalauda is well connected by roads and railway. It is 21 km from Mandsaur and is connected by private bus services to all the nearest major cities. Dalauda railway station connects to the major cities of Rajasthan and Madhya Pradesh.
