= Jungwon Air Base =

Airbase in South Korea

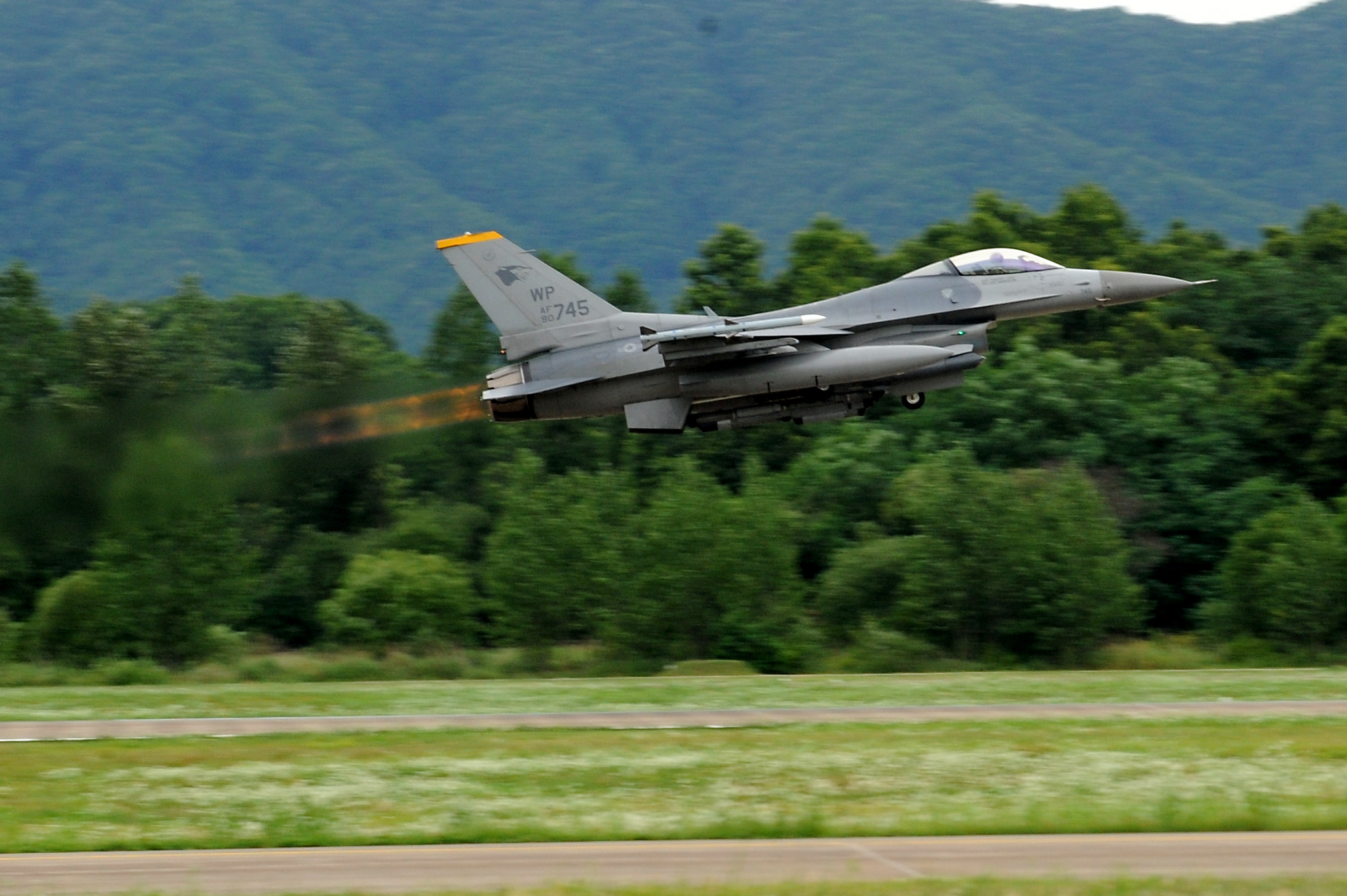
- F-16C takes off from Jungwon Air Base
- IATA: JWO; ICAO: RKTI

Summary
- Airport type: Military
- Owner/Operator: Republic of Korea Air Force
- Location: Chungju, South Korea
- Elevation AMSL: 281 ft / 86 m
- Coordinates: 37°01′48″N 127°53′07″E

Map

Runways
Direction	Length		Surface
Direction	m	ft	Surface
18R/34L	2,884	9,330	concrete
34R/16L	2,750	9,021	concrete
- Source: DAFIF

Jungwon Air Base (IATA: JWO, ICAO: RKTI) (sometimes K-75 Air Base or Choongwon Air Base) is located near Chungju, North Chungcheong Province, South Korea.

== Units stationed ==
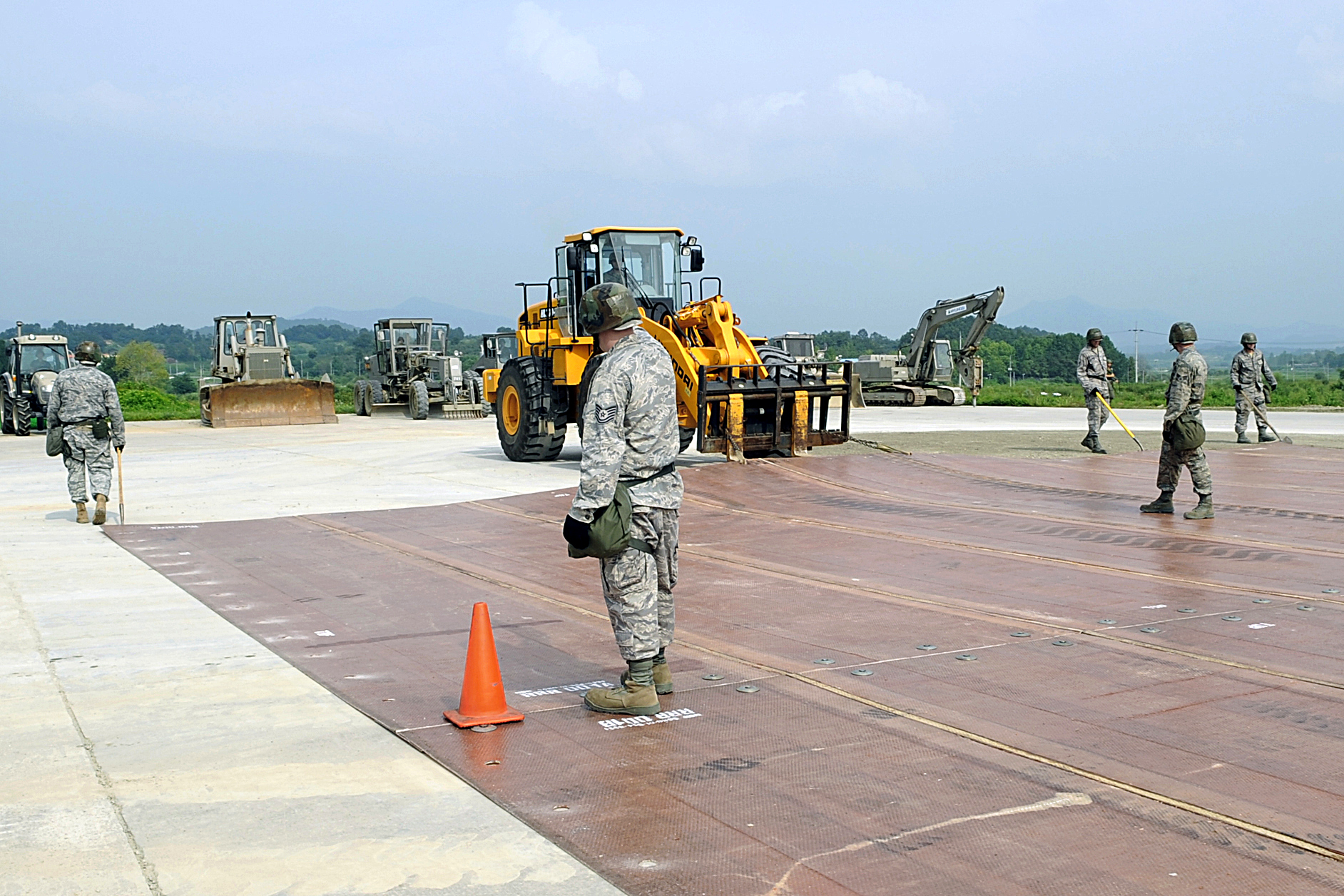
USAF airmen practice runway repair at Jungwon in 2009

The base is home to the RoKAF 19th Fighter Wing (제19전투비행단), comprising:

- 161st Fighter Squadron flying F-16C/D (Block 32)
- 162nd Fighter Squadron flying F-16C/D (Block 32)
- 155th Fighter Squadron flying KF-16C/D (Block 52)
- 159th Fighter Squadron flying KF-16C/D (Block 52)

== Accidents and incidents ==
- 30 June 2003, F-16 made a hard landing, the pilot ejected successfully.
- 27 January 2006, F-16C #85-1576 crashed shortly after takeoff, the pilot ejected successfully.
