= Singarpur =

Village in Bihar, India

Singarpur is a village in the Kishanganj block of Madhepura District in Bihar, India.
