= Kolvi Mandi Rajendra pura =

- Census town
- Location in Rajasthan, India Kolvi Mandi Rajendra pura (India)
- Coordinates: 23.9653°N 75.5964°E
- Country: India
- State: Rajasthan
- District: Jhalawar

Population (2001)
  - Total: 7,860

Languages
  - Official: Hindi
- Time zone: UTC+5:30 (IST)

Kolvi Mandi Rajendra pura is a census town in Jhalawar district in the Indian state of Rajasthan.

== Demographics ==
As of 2001 India census, Kolvi Mandi Rajendra pura had a population of 7860. Males constitute 52% of the population and females 48%. Kolvi Mandi Rajendra pura has an average literacy rate of 68%, higher than the national average of 59.5%: male literacy is 76%, and female literacy is 59%. In Kolvi Mandi Rajendra pura, 15% of the population is under 6 years of age.
