= Bayana =

Town in India

- Town
- Nickname: City of Banasura
- Interactive map of Bayana
- Coordinates: 26.9°N 77.28°E
- Country: India
- State: Rajasthan
- District: Bharatpur

Government
  - Type: Municipality
- Elevation: 196 m (643 ft)

Population (2011)
  - Total: 55,000

Languages
  - Official: Hindi
- Time zone: UTC+5:30 (IST)
- PIN: 321401
- Vehicle registration: RJ-05

Bayana is a historical town and the headquarters of Bayana tehsil in the Bharatpur district of Rajasthan, India. Hindaun, the nearest city to Bayana, is just 33 km (21 mi) away. Bayana is also known as the "City of Bansasura".

== History ==
Although Bayana fort was chiefly regalities as ruling Headquarters of Bharatpur Kingdom 1195 AD and 1196 AD, Mohammad Ghori attacked Bayana, during which the ruler Raja Kumarpala faced the defeat.

=== Vedic period ===
It is called the "City of Banasura" because of the premonition of Usha, the daughter of Banasura and Aniruddha and the great-grandson of Lord Krishna, which is described in Srimad Bhagwat 10.62 and Puranas.

=== 3rd-4th century: Gupta dynasty ===
The Usha Mandir temple is proof of this. In 322 AD, the Gupta dynasty was ruled by Chandragupta II. At that time Pushpa Gupta was appointed as its governor in the area of Sripath. From 371 AD to 372 AD, the feudatory warlord Kshatriya of Emperor Samudragupta erected the Yajna Pillar. Its remains are still present today. There is also evidence that there was a fort here at that time too.

=== 4th century: Pushyabhuti dynasty's Bhimalat ===
The Bhimalat was built in 371 AD. It is also called Vijay Pillar. The pillar was built by King Vishnu Vardhan of Pushyabhuti dynasty (Vardhan dynasty) at the conclusion of the Pundarik Yajna. This pillar is a monolithic pillar made of red sandstone. The pillar stands on a platform that is 13.6 feet long and 9.2 feet wide. The length of the pillar is 26.3 feet. The first 22.7-foot section is octagonal. It is clear from the metal on the top of the pillar that there must have been something on top of it as well.

=== 9th-11th century: Gurjara-Pratihara dynasty ===
In 960 AD, the Gurjara-Pratihara dynasty ruled. Queen Chitralekha of the Fakka dynasty and King Laxman San built the Usha Mandir temple under the rule of Emperor Mahipal. Maharaja Vijayapala ruled from 999 AD to 1043 AD.

=== 12th-17th century: Muslim and Hindu Rajput period ===
The Delhi Sultanate (12th-16th century) rule was followed by the Mughal Empire (16th-18th century) when Bayana was the site of the Battle of Bayana in 1527 between Rajput ruler Rana Sanga, the ruler of Mewar, and Mughal emperor Babur.

The īdgāh of Bayana (c. 1195), likely constructed during the tenure of Bahā al-Dīn Tughrul, the first Muslim governor of Bayana between 1195 and 1210, has 60 m long freestanding wall, with a central miḥrāb flanked by four smaller niches on each side, and a circular tower on the two ends and an open paved platform in front. It has a central mihrab that is built as a square chamber projecting behind the qibla wall and roofed by a corbelled dome, in emulation of the arcaded iwāns of Iran and Afghanistan. Traces of the original minbar can be seen on the right of the central mihrab.

=== 18th-20th century: Hindu Jat period ===
With decline of the Mughal Empire the jats of Bharatpur (18-20th century) ruled. The remains and inscriptions of dozens of buildings exist that date back to these periods.

== Geography ==
Bayana is located in a small plain, between two hill ranges running more or less parallel to each other near the left bank of the Gambhir river, at a distance of 45 km (28 mi) from Bharatpur. Bayana is located at 26.9°N 77.28°E. It has an average elevation of 196 metres (643 feet).

== Economy ==
Bayana has a large industrial area known as riico Bayana, which mainly consist of stone industries.

== Tourism ==
=== Usha temple and mosque ===
Bayana is home to the co-located Usha temple associated with the Banasur and the Usha Mosque.

== Transport ==
Bayana Junction railway station is a major railway station situated on Delhi Mumbai Railway network which connects people to major cities like Delhi, Mathura, Kota and Agra etc. Daily passenger trains also originate from and terminate to Bayana jn.

== See also ==
- Brij
