= Kota Junction railway station =

Railway Station in Rajasthan, India

Kota Junction
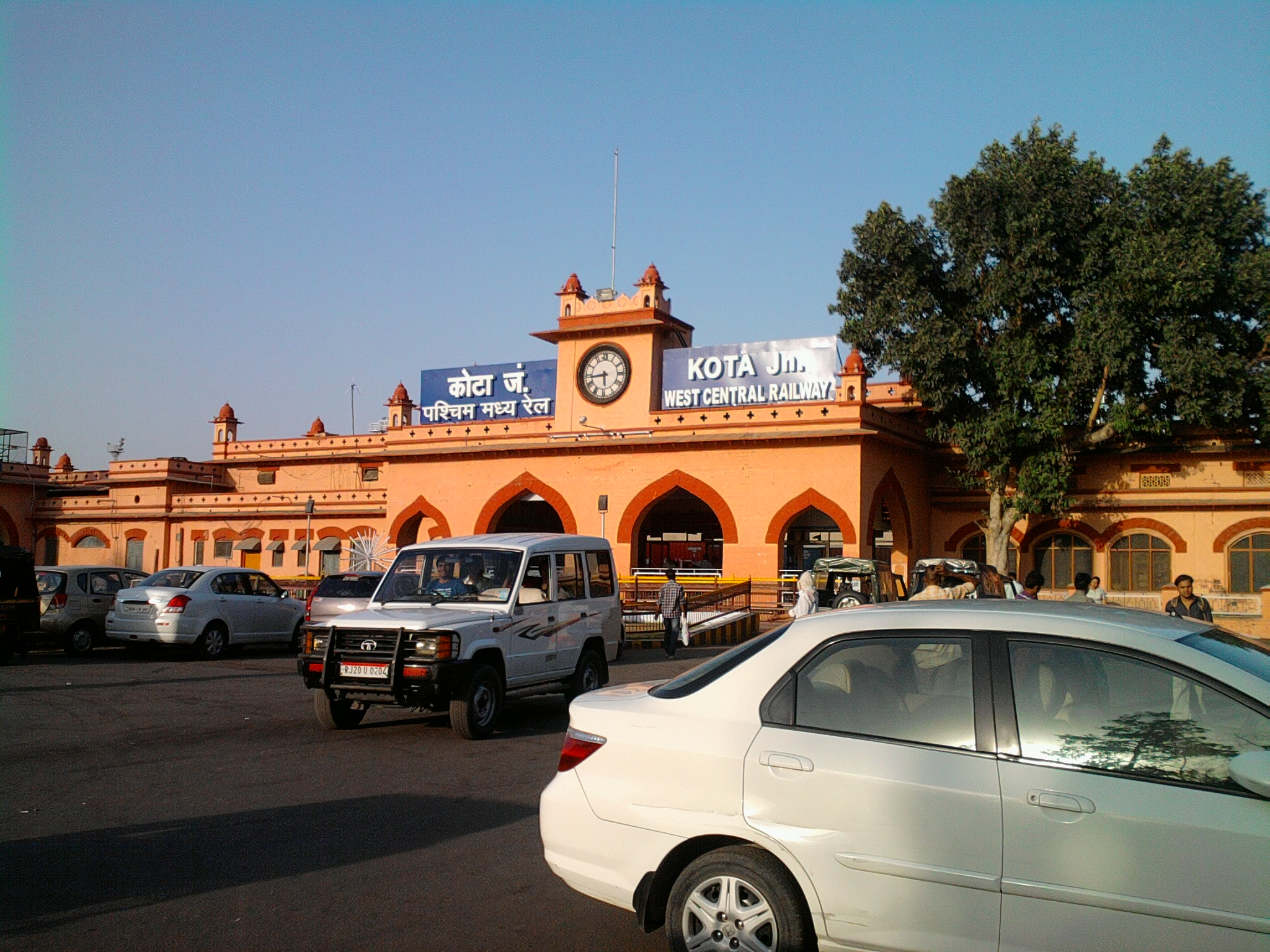
- Kota Junction

General information
- Location: Bhimganj Mandi, Railway Colony Rd, Railway station area, Kota, Rajasthan
- Coordinates: 25.2231°N 75.8810°E
- Elevation: 256 metres (840 ft)
- System: Indian Railways junction station
- Owner: Indian Railways
- Operator: Kota railway division
- Lines: New Delhi–Mumbai main line, New Delhi–Kota section, Kota–Jaipur main line, Kota–Rewari railway line, Kota–Bina line, Gwalior–Kota railway line, Kota–Bundi–Chittaurgarh line,
- Platforms: 6
- Tracks: 11

Construction
- Structure type: Standard on-ground station
- Parking: Yes
- Accessible: Disabled access

Other information
- Status: Functioning
- Station code: KOTA
- Division(s): Kota
- Fare zone: West Central Railway zone

Passengers
- 36000 per day
Location
- Location within Rajasthan

Kota Junction railway station (station code: KOTA) is an NSG-2 category junction railway station in Kota, Rajasthan, on the New Delhi–Mumbai main line. It serves as the headquarters of the Kota Division of West Central Railway and is one of the major railway junctions on the route.

== Background ==
Kota is an important station on the New Delhi–Mumbai main line and has direct connectivity with all major cities in the country. More than 220 trains make a halt at the station. Many important trains originate from Kota including Patna–Kota Express, Kota-Hazrat Nizamuddin Jan Shatabdi Express, Kota-Hisar Express, Kota-Dehradun Nanda Devi Express, Kota-Shree Mata Vaishno Devi Katra Express, Damoh–Kota Passenger, Indore–Kota Intercity Express and Kota–Shri Ganganagar Superfast Express.

Kota city is also served by another 2 railway substation called New Kota railway station (NKOT) located opposite to Rajeev Gandhi Nagar in the southern part of the city & Sogaria railway station (SGAC)

== Electrification ==
The Kanwalpura–Kota and Gurla–Kota sections were electrified in the financial year of 1987–88 under Western Railways. (Note: Before the formation of West Central Railway zone on 1 April 2003, Kota Junction was a part of Western Railways.)

== Passenger movement ==
Kota is amongst the top hundred booking stations of Indian Railway.
