= Kota railway division =

Railway division of India

Kota railway division is one of the three railway divisions under West Central Railway zone of Indian Railways. This railway division was formed on 1 April 1952 and its headquarters are located at Kota in the state of Rajasthan of India.

Jabalpur railway division and Bhopal railway division are the other two railway divisions under WCR Zone headquartered at Jabalpur.

== List of railway stations and towns ==
The list includes the stations under the Kota division and their station category.

Category of station	No. of stations	Names of stations
A-1	1	Kota Junction
A	2	Bharatpur Junction, Sawai Madhopur Junction
B	5	Bundi, Bhawani Mandi, Gangapur City, Hindaun City, Ramganj Mandi Junction
C suburban station	2	Dakaniya Talav, Sogaria
D	11	Baran, Bayana Junction, Chaumahla, Chhabra Gugor, Dakaniya Talav, Indragarh Sumerganj Mandi, Lakheri, Shri Mahabirji, Shamgarh, Suwasra, Vikramgarh Alot
E	-	Alniya, Amli, Antha, Arnetha, Atru, Barudani, Bassi berisal, Bhonra, Bhulon, Bijora, Chhajawa, Chhoti odai, Dadhdevi, Dara, Dharnaoda, Dhaurmui jaghina, Dhuankheri, Digod, Dumariya, Fateh Singhpura, Garot, Ghatkavarana, Gurla, Hanspura, Jajan patti, Jalindri, Jhalawar road, Kanwalpura, Kapren, Kela devi, Keshorai patan, Khandip, Kurlasi, Kushtala, Laban, Lalpur umri, Luni richha, Malarna, Mandlagarh, Mehidpur road, Mokholi, Morak, Motipura chauki, Murhesi rampur, Narayanpur tatwara, Nathu kheri, Nimoda, Parsoli, Pingora, Ranthambhor, Ravtha road, Rawanjna dungar, Rohalkhurd, Salpura, Sewar, Shyampura, Srinagar, Talavli, Thalera, Thuria, Upramal, Sri kalyanpura, Julmi, Jhalawar city.
F halt station	-	Chandresal, Chaurakheri, Chauraman nagri, Dhindhora hukmikhera, Jaicholi, Kesholi, Piplod road, Ranikund rarah, Salabad, Sikrodamina.
Total	-	-

Stations closed for Passengers -
