= Bayana Junction =

Railway station in Rajasthan, India

- Indian Railways logo

General information
- Location: Bayana, Bharatpur district, Rajasthan; India
- Coordinates: 26.915977°N 77.296508°E
- System: Indian Railways station
- Owner: Indian Railways
- Operator: West Central Railways
- Lines: New Delhi–Mumbai main line, Bayana–Agra railway line
- Platforms: 3
- Tracks: 3

Construction
- Structure type: Standard (on-ground station)
- Parking: Yes
- Accessible: Available

Other information
- Status: Functioning
- Station code: BXN
- Zone(s): West Central Railway zone
- Division(s): Kota
Location
- Location within Rajasthan Location within India

Bayana Junction is a railway station in Bharatpur district, Rajasthan. Its code is BXN. It serves Bayana town. The station consists of 3 platforms. Passenger, Express, and Superfast trains halt here.
