= Mandsaur district =

Coordinates: 24.072617°N 75.067944°E

- District of Madhya Pradesh
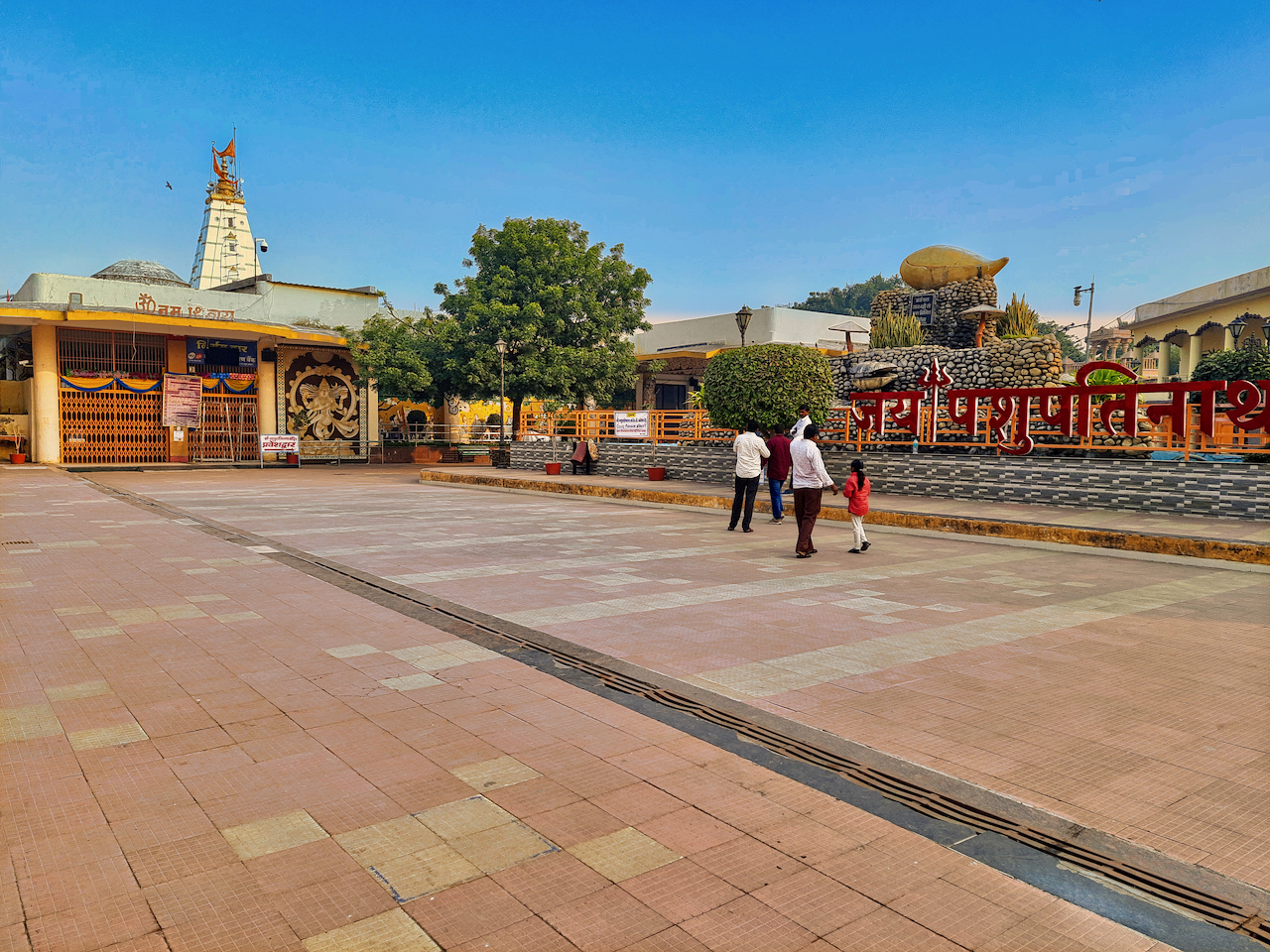
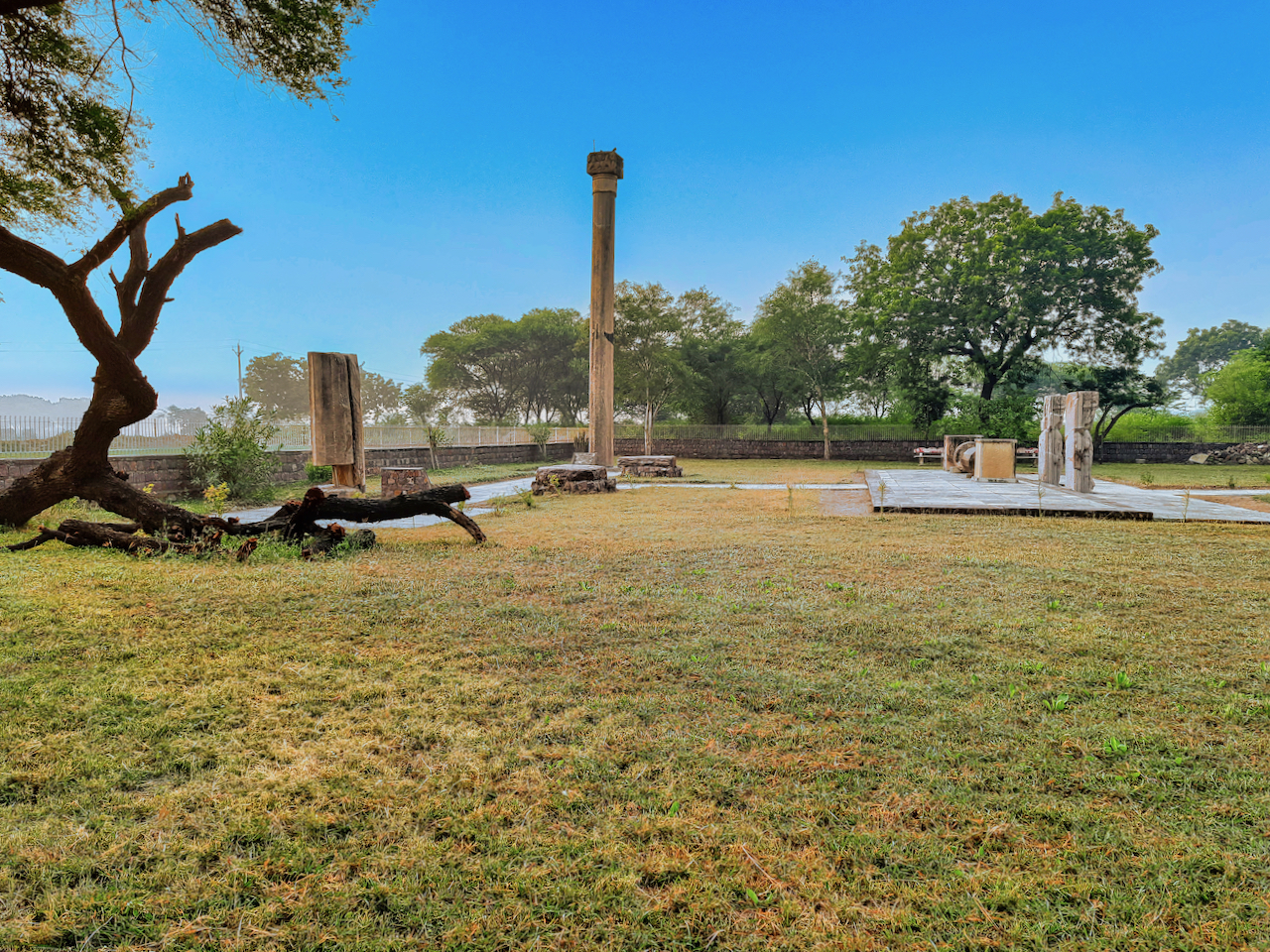
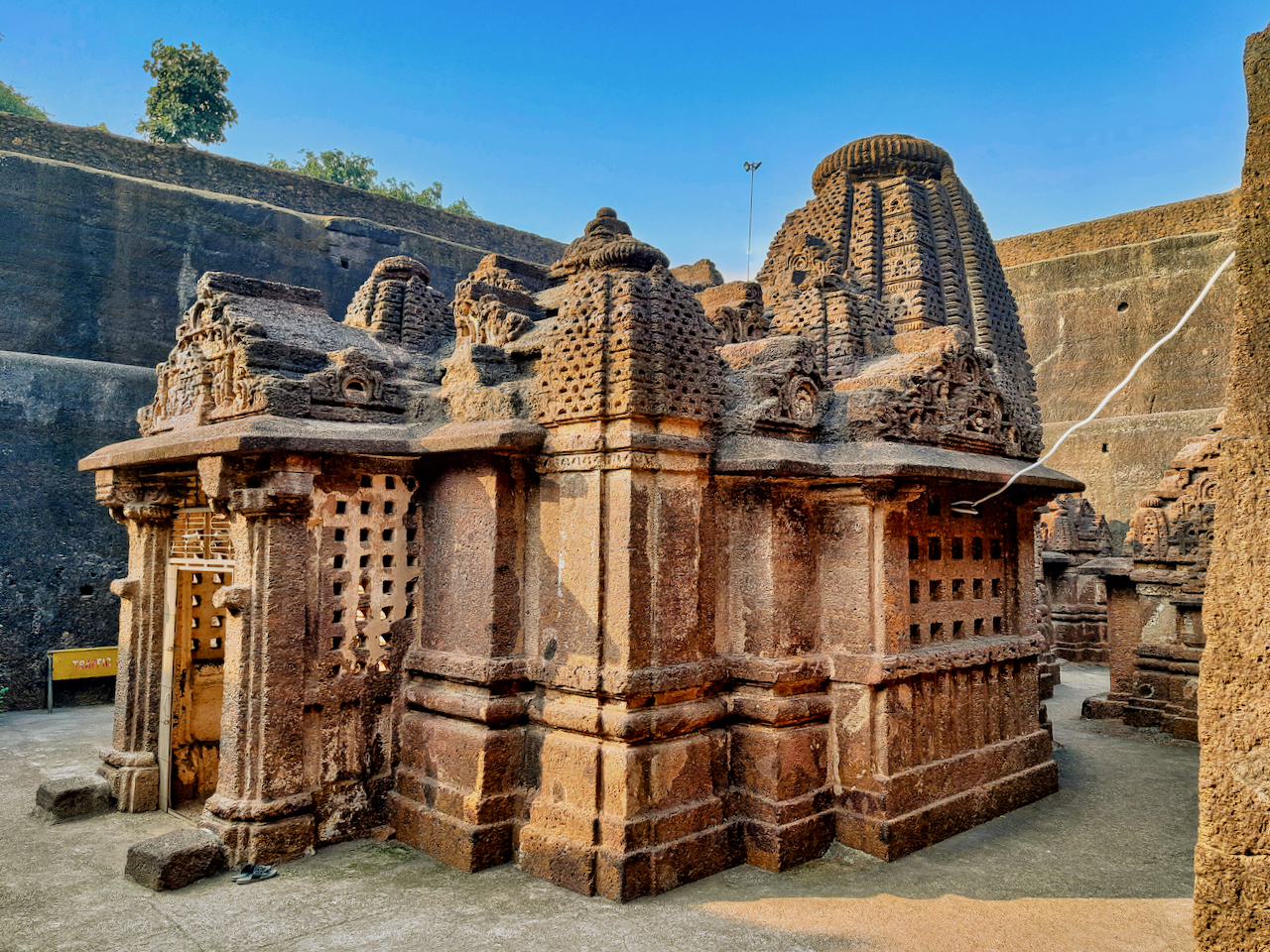
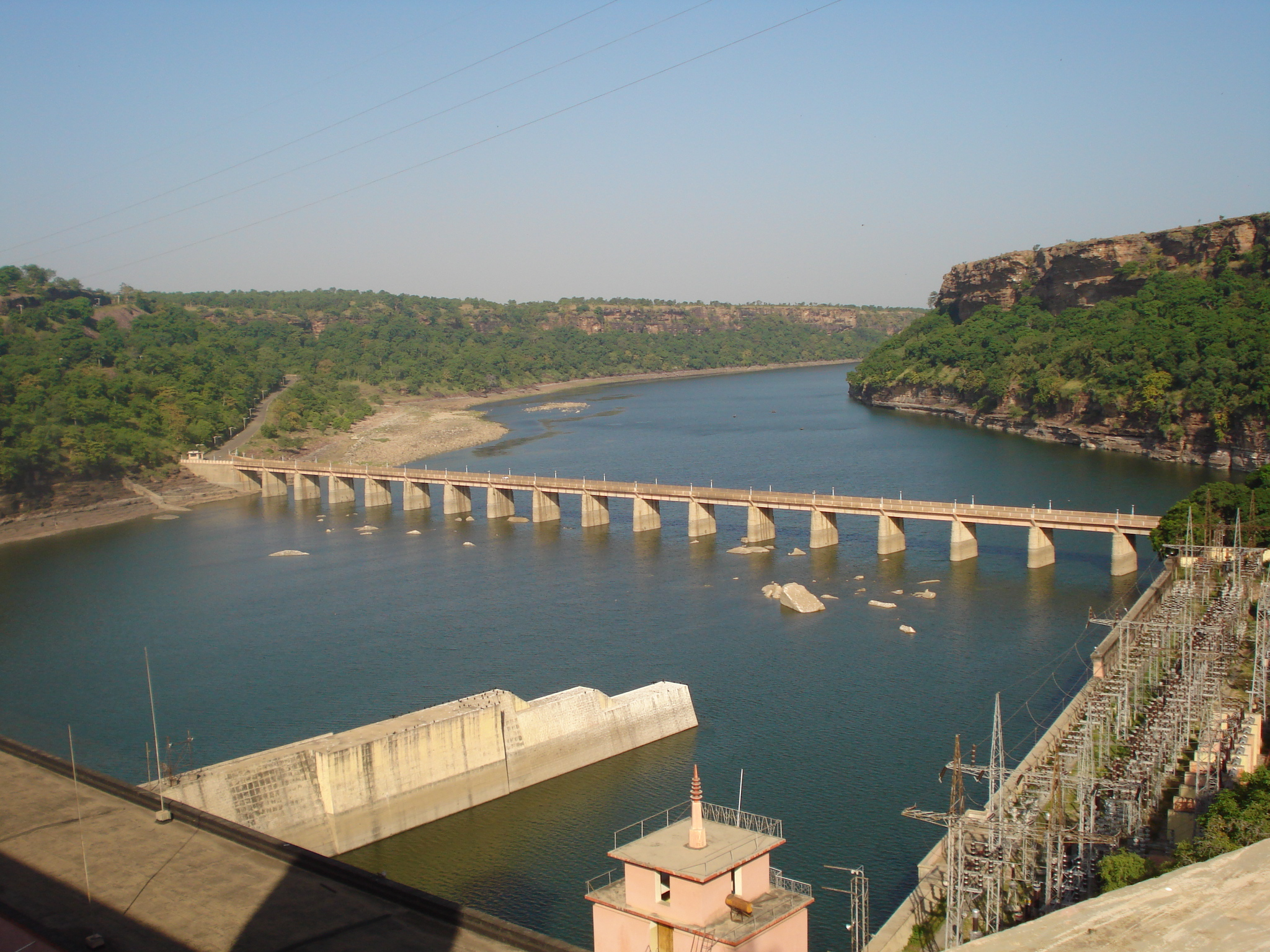
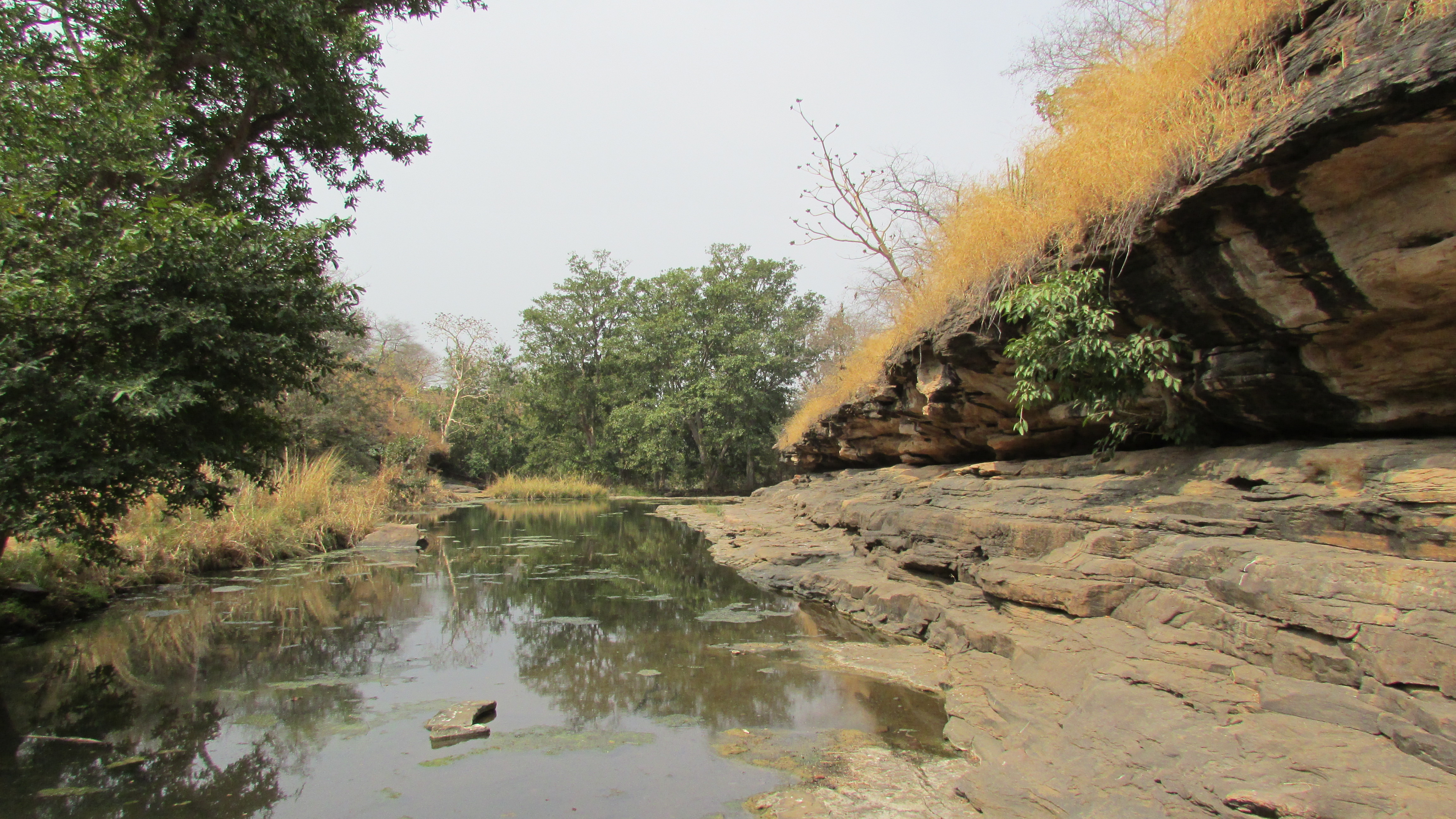
- Clockwise from top-left: Pashupatinath Temple, Mandsaur, Sondhni Vijayasthambha, Gandhi Sagar, Chatarbhuj Nala rock shelters, Chandwasa Dharmanatha temples

- Location of Mandsaur district in Madhya Pradesh
- Country: India
- State: Madhya Pradesh
- Division: Ujjain
- Headquarters: Mandsaur
- Tehsils: 9

Government
  - Lok Sabha constituencies: Mandsaur

Area
  - Total: 9,791 km^{2} (3,780 sq mi)

Population (2011)
  - Total: 1,340,411
  - Density: 136.9/km^{2} (354.6/sq mi)

Demographics
  - Literacy: 71.78 per cent
  - Sex ratio: 966
- Time zone: UTC+05:30 (IST)
- Vehicle registration: MP-14
- Website: mandsaur.nic.in

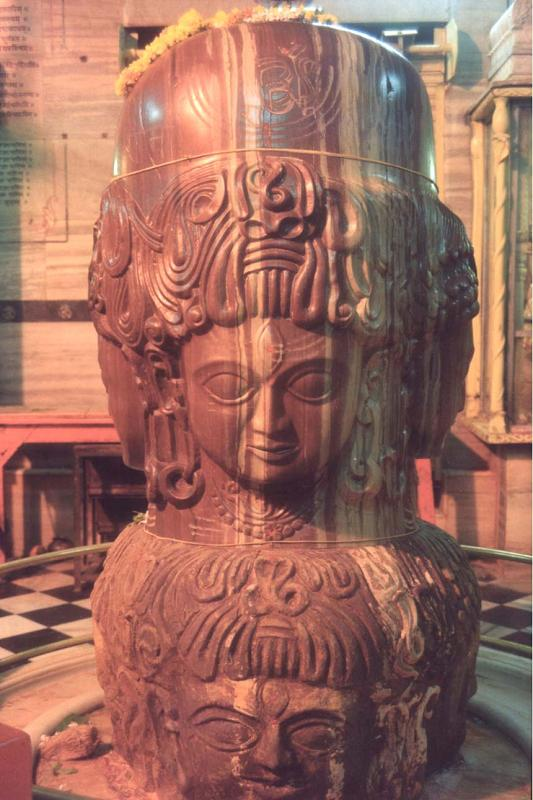
Idol of Lord Pashupatinath in Mandsaur

Mandsaur district (Hindi pronunciation: [mən̪d̪.sɔːɾ]) is a district of Madhya Pradesh state in central India. The town of Mandsaur is the administrative headquarters of the district. The ancient Pashupatinath temple is situated in Mandsaur. Large quantities of opium are produced in Mandsaur district.Mandsaur district is located western part of Madhya Pradesh.

== Origin of name ==
The District takes its name from the headquarters town, Mandsaur. It is considered to have been evolved from Marhsaur, originating from Marh and Saur or Dasaur, two of the villages which merged in the town. The town was known as Dashpur during ancient times. Other etymology claims it derives from Mandodari, wife of Ravana, who is said to have been born in the district.

== Geography ==
The district has an area of 9,791 km^{2} (3,780 sq mi). The district is present on the border of the Mewar and Malwa so the culture is the combination of the both regions, and is bounded by Neemuch District to the north west, Chittorgarh district to North east, Kota district and Jhalawar district to east and Pratapgarh District, and Ratlam District to the south. It is part of Ujjain Division.

Mandsaur District forms the northern projection of Madhya Pradesh from its western Division, i.e., Ujjain Commissioner's Division. It lies between the parallels of latitude 230 45' 50" North and 250 2' 55" North, and between the meridians of longitude 740 42' 30" East and 750 50' 20" East.

The district is an average-size district of Madhya Pradesh. It extends for about 142 km (88 mi). from north to south and 124 km (77 mi) from east to west.

=== Climate ===
The climate of this district is generally dry except in south-west monsoon. Year may be divided into four seasons. The cold season is from December to February. This is followed by the hot season from March to the middle of June. Thereafter the south-west monsoon season starts and continues up to about the middle of September.

The average annual rainfall in the District is 786.6 mm (30.97 in). The rainfall in the districts in the region round about Sitamau- Mandsaur- Malhargarh, and in general increases in the northern part of the district from the west towards the east. The heaviest rainfall in 24 hours recorded at any station in the district was 323.9 mm (12.75 in). at Garoth on 1945 June 29.

In the district there is rapid increase in temperatures after February. May is generally the hottest month with the mean daily maximum temperature at 39.80 °C (103.64 °F) and the mean daily minimum at 25.40 °C (77.72 °F). Days are intensely hot in summer and hot dust-laden winds which below during this season add to the discomfort. On individual days in the summer session and in June before the onset of the monsoon the day temperatures often go up above 45 °C (113 °F). January is the coldest month, with the mean daily maximum temperature at 35.00 °C (95.00 °F) and mean daily minimum at 9.30 °C (48.74 °F).

== Industry ==
Opium production and the slate pencil industry are important to the district's economy. Some parts of the district have wind farms. There is a Solar Plant in district .

== Divisions ==
The district is divided into four sub divisions and nine tehsils. The sub divisional headquarters are at Mandsaur, Malhargarh, Sitamau and Garoth. Where, Mandsaur, Malhargarh, Garoth, Shamgarh, Daloda, Bhanpura, Suwasra and Sitamau and KAYAMPUR Mandsur are nine tehsils of District.

Vehicle number plates beginning with MP-14 are identified as a registered vehicle under the properly followed rules and regulations.

== Demographics ==
Historical population
Year	Pop.	±% p.a.
1901	204,438	—
1911	230,616	+1.21%
1921	238,620	+0.34%
1931	270,796	+1.27%
1941	319,362	+1.66%
1951	373,755	+1.59%
1961	467,595	+2.27%
1971	593,319	+2.41%
1981	775,281	+2.71%
1991	956,869	+2.13%
2001	1,183,724	+2.15%
2011	1,340,411	+1.25%

Religions in Mandsaur district (2011)
Religion	Percent
Hinduism	88.97%
Islam	9.37%
Jainism	1.42%
Other or not stated	0.24%

According to the 2011 census Mandsaur District has a population of 1,340,411, roughly equal to the nation of Mauritius or the US state of Maine. This gives it a ranking of 361st in India (out of a total of 640). The district has a population density of 242 inhabitants per square kilometre (630/sq mi). Its population growth rate over the decade 2001-2011 was 13.19%. Mandsaur has a sex ratio of 966 females for every 1000 males, and a literacy rate of 72.75%. 20.71% of the population lives in urban areas. Scheduled Castes and Scheduled Tribes make up 18.58% and 2.47% of the population respectively.

Languages of Mandsaur district (2011)
1. Hindi (49.1%)
2. Malvi (48.6%)
3. Others (2.29%)

At the time of the 2011 Census of India, 49.13% of the population spoke Hindi and 48.58% of the population spoke Malvi as their first language. The local dialect is a mixture of Malwi and Mewari.

== Culture ==
The temple of Lord Pashupatinath is located on the bank of the Shivna. The most common language is mixture of Mewari and Malwi (Rajasthani).

== Villages ==
- BOLIYA (RAJASTHAN BORDER)
- Kotda Bujurg
- Navali
- Sondani
- Songari
