= Malwa Ki Sanskritik Virasat Evam Paryatan =

Indian work of historiography

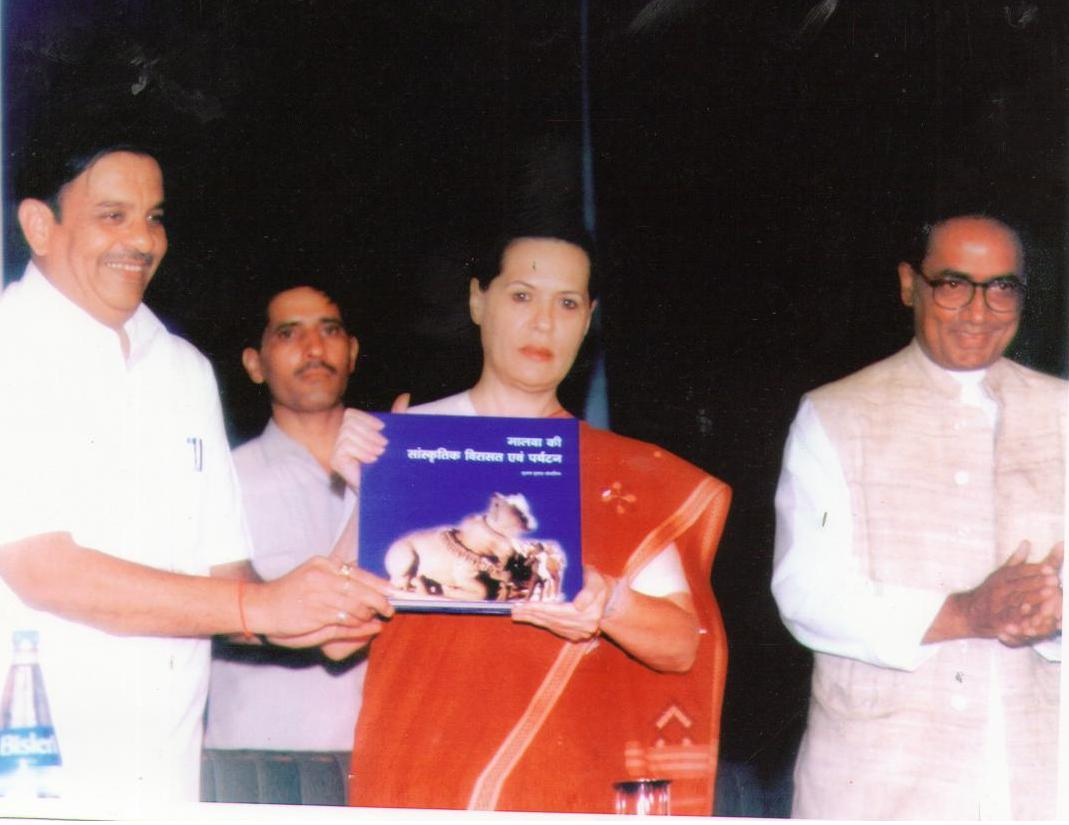
Malwa ki Sanskratik Virasat evam Paryatan released by Mrs Sonia Gandhi

Malwa Ki Sanskritik Virasat Evam Paryatan (The Cultural Heritage and Tourism of Malwa) is a book written by Subhash Kumar Sojatia. It was released by Sonia Gandhi.

== Synopsis ==
The book discusses cultural and archaeological highlights of the Bhanpura area of Madhya Pradesh in India.

The book examines artifacts from Prehistoric era to Maratha Period which had not received much attention previously . The sculpture and idols of Hinglajgarh fort are described in detail. The prehistoric rock paintings located on the banks of the Chambal River are described as well.

The Chaitya Vihar, the Dhamnar Caves of the Buddhist period, Poladungar, and the rock paintings of Chaturbhujnath Nala and Chibbad Nala. are also discussed

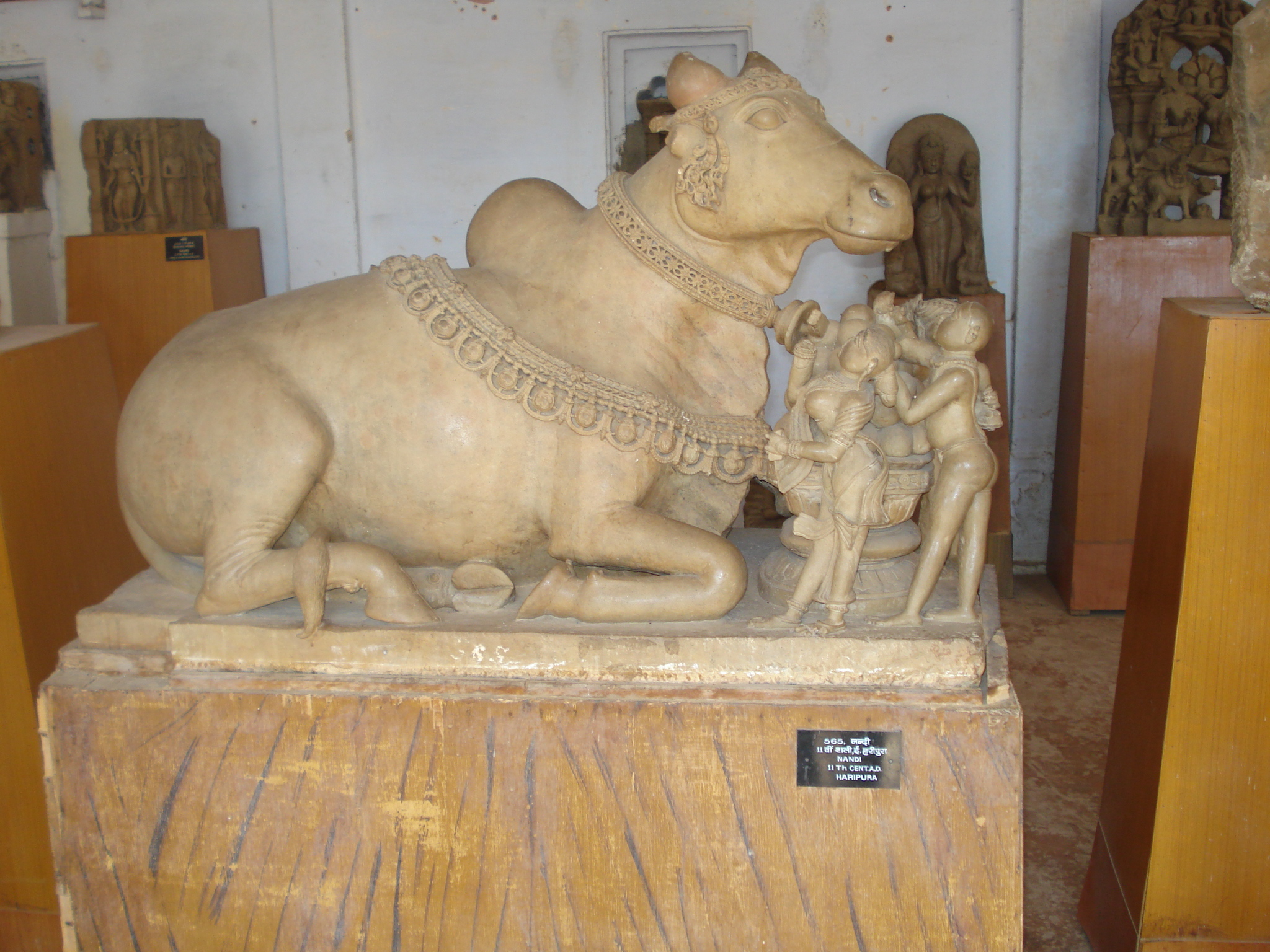
Nandi Statue at Bhanpura Museum

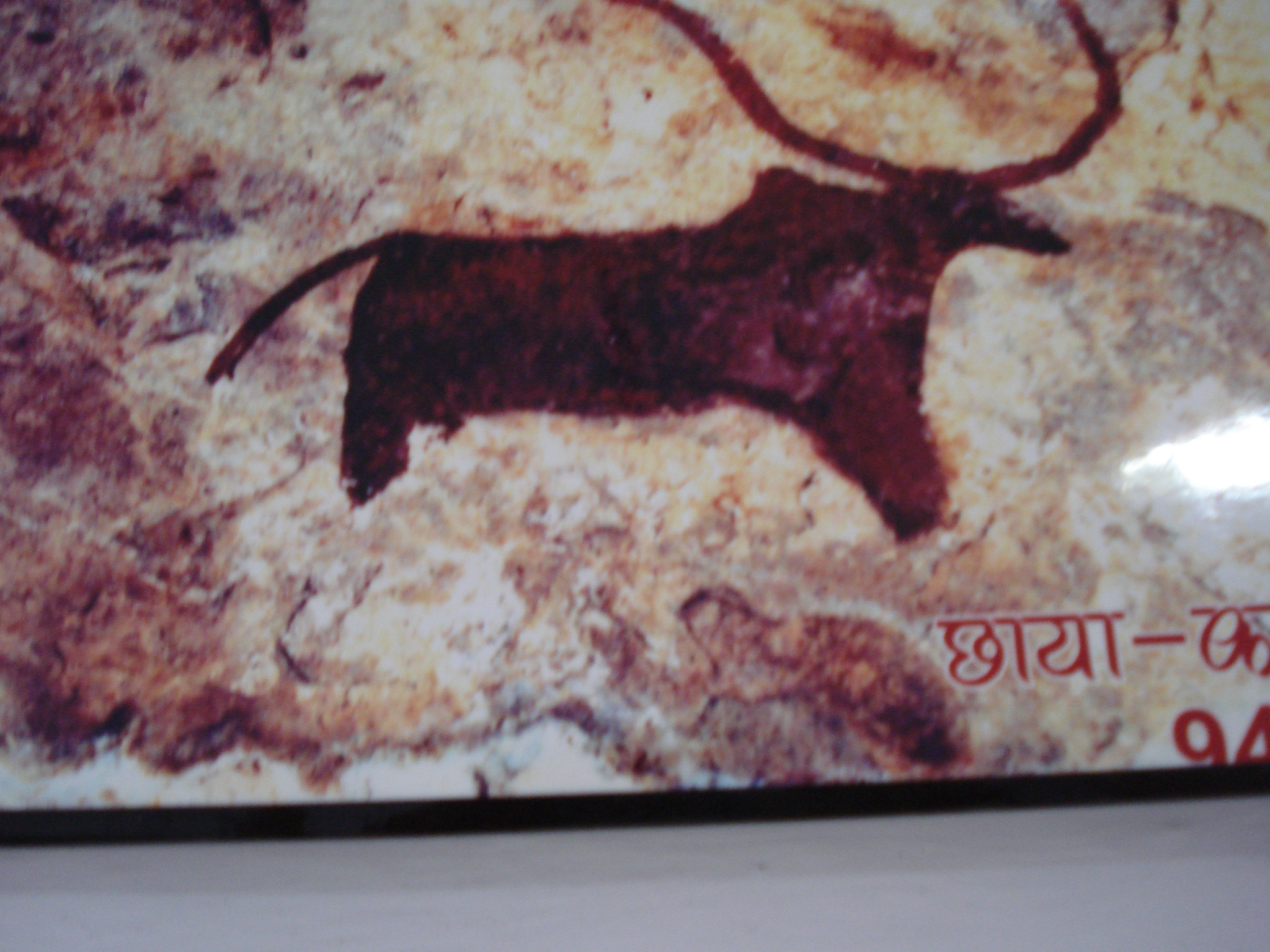
Rock painting Bhanpura
