= Navali =

Navali may refer to:

- Navali, Gangavathi, a village in Gangavathi taluk, Koppal district, Karnataka, India
- Navali, Lingasugur, a village in Lingasugur taluk, Raichur district, Karnataka, India
- Navali, Mandsaur, a village in Bhanpura tehsil, Mandsaur district, Madhya Pradesh, India
- Navali, a village in Panhala taluka, Kolhapur district, Maharashtra, India

== See also ==
- Navalli, a village in Dharwad district, Karnataka, India
- Navaly, a town in the Jaffna District of Sri Lanka
