= Gandhi Sagar Sanctuary =

Wildlife sanctuary in India

- IUCN category IV (habitat/species management area)
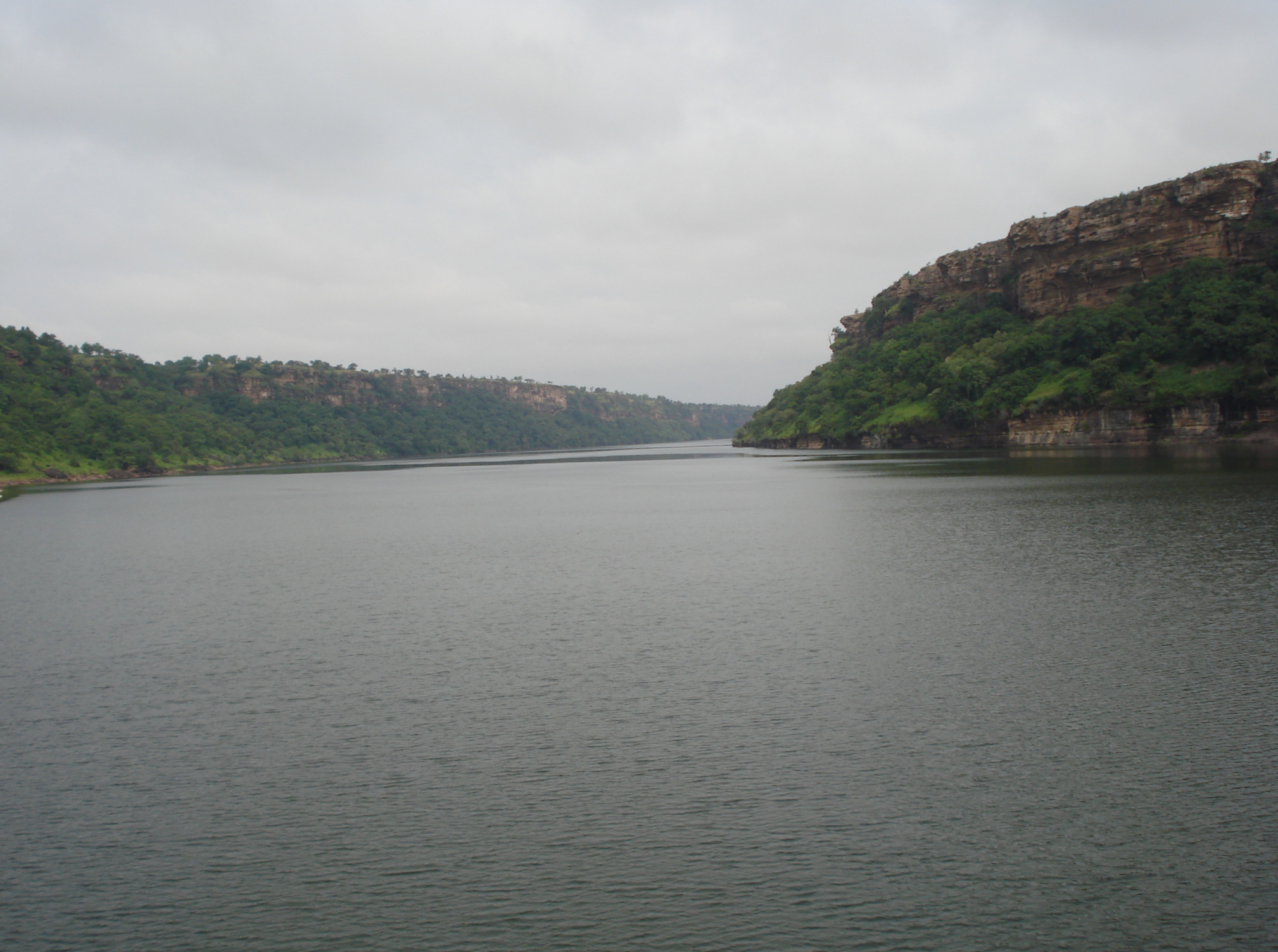
- River Chambal in Gandhi Sagar Sanctuary

- Location within Madhya Pradesh Location within India
- Interactive map of Gandhi Sagar Sanctuary
- Location: Mandsaur and Nimach districts Madhya Pradesh, India
- Coordinates: 24.583°N 75.712°E
- Area: 368.62 km^{2} (142.32 sq mi)
- Established: 1974

Gandhi Sagar Sanctuary is a wildlife sanctuary situated on the northern boundary of Mandsaur and Neemuch districts in Madhya Pradesh, India. It is spread over an area of 368.62 km^{2} (142.32 sq mi) adjoining Rajasthan state in India. It was notified in 1974 and more area was added in 1983. The Chambal River passes through the sanctuary dividing it into two parts. The western part is in Neemuch district and eastern part is in Mandsaur district. It is in the Khathiar-Gir dry deciduous forests ecoregion.

== Flora and fauna ==
The Sanctuary is open throughout the year. With a varied terrain of wooded hills – the forest being dry, mixed and deciduous- and flat grasslands around Gandhi sagar dam submergence, it offers abundant opportunities of sighting a variety of wildlife. The principal tree species found in the Sanctuary are Khair (Acacia catechu), Salai, Kardhai, Dhawda, Tendu, Palash etc.

The main predators found here are cheetah, dhole, Indian leopard, striped hyena, and Indian jackal. In 2025, a caracal was spotted here, a cat species critically endangered in India. Common herbivores include chinkara, nilgai, chital, Indian boar, and sambar deer. Other notable species here are sloth bear, Indian pangolin, northern plains gray langur, smooth-coated otter, Indian peafowl, and the mugger crocodile.

== Places archaeological and religious importance ==
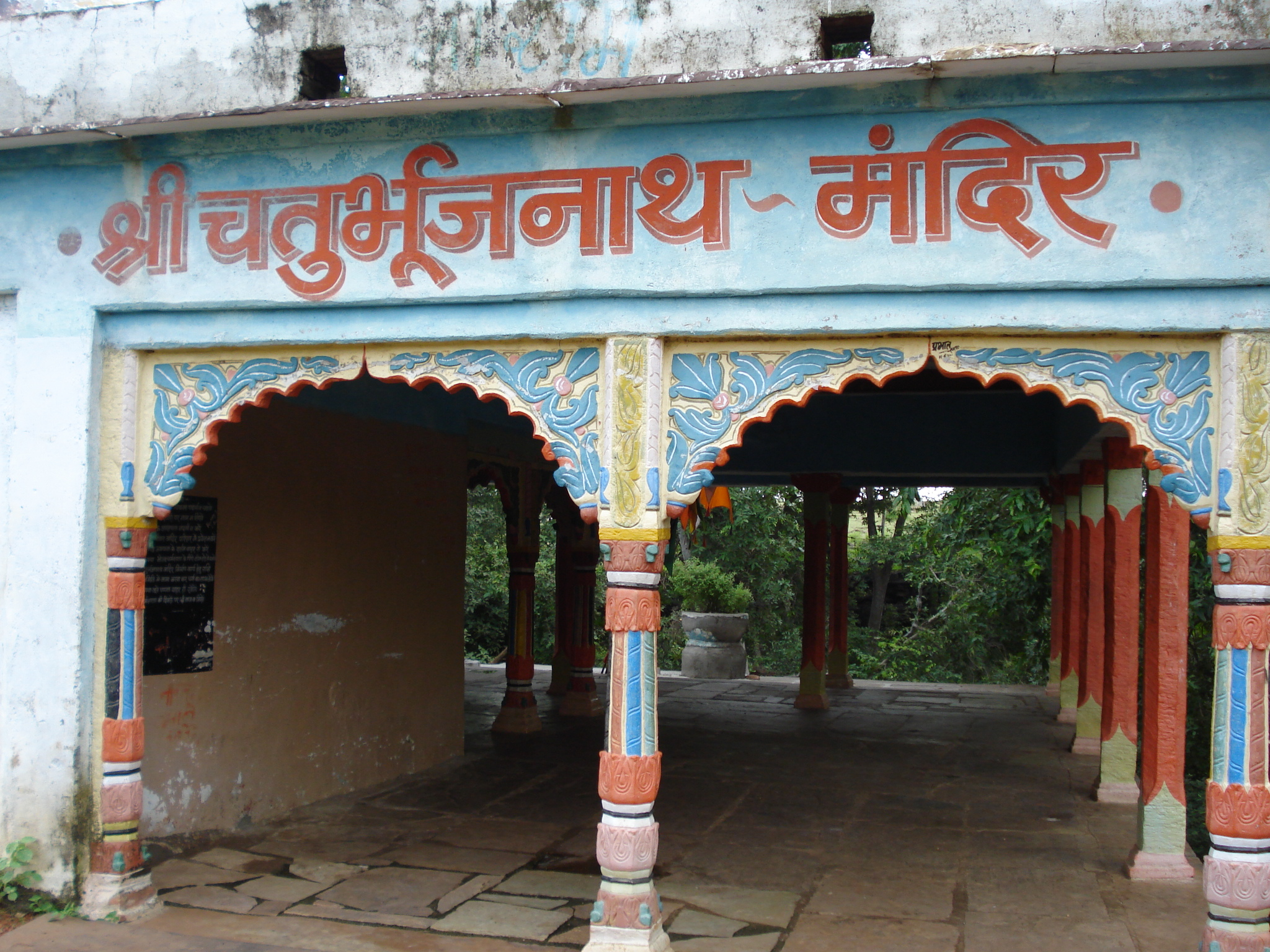
Chatubhujnath temple in Gandhi Sagar Sanctuary

Sanctuary has many places of historical, archaeological and religious importance. These are Chaurasigarh, Chaturbhujnath temple, Bhadkaji rock paintings, Narsinghjhar, Hinglajgarh Fort, Taxakeshwar temple etc.

- Chaturbhujnath temple, dedicated to Vishnu, is located about 8 km from Gandhi sagar dam site
- Hinglajgarh or Hinglaj Fort is an ancient fort situated near village Navali in Bhanpura tehsil of Mandsaur district in Madhya Pradesh
- Taxakeshwar temple or Takhaji is a place of religious and historical importance in Mandsaur district
- Bhanpura Museum is located in Bhanpura, about 30.0 km (18.6 miles) from Gandhi sagar dam and 127.0 km (78.9 miles) from Mandsaur in north-east direction. The museum depicting the popular arts of Mandsaur
- Dharmrajeshwar is an ancient Buddhist and Hindu cave temple site of 4th-5th Century in Mandsaur

== See also ==
- Central India
- Tourism in Madhya Pradesh
