= Chandar Singh Sisodiya =

Indian politician

Chandar Singh Sisodiya (born 1963) is an Indian politician from Madhya Pradesh. He is an MLA from Garoth Assembly constituency in Mandsaur District. He won the 2023 Madhya Pradesh Legislative Assembly election, representing the Bharatiya Janata Party.

== Early life and education ==
Sisodiya is from Garoth, Mandsaur District, Madhya Pradesh. He is the son of Nathusingh Sisodiya. He completed his B.Com. in 1985 at the Government College, Rampura, which is affiliated with Vikram University, Ujjain.

== Career ==
Sisodiya won from Garoth Assembly constituency in the 2023 Madhya Pradesh Legislative Assembly election representing the Bharatiya Janata Party. He polled 108,602 votes and defeated his nearest rival, Subhash Kumar Sojatia of the Indian National Congress, by a margin of 18,107 votes. He was first elected as an MLA winning the by-election to the Garoth seat in June 2015, which is necessitated due to the death of sitting MLA Rajesh Yadav of the BJP. He won the by-election defeating his nearest rival, Sojatia of the Congress, by a margin of 12,945 votes.
