= Subhash Kumar Sojatia =

Indian politician and author (born 1952)

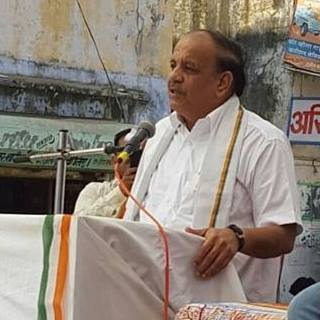
- Sojatia in 2016

Minister of Home, Health, Industry, Commerce, Medical Education and Public Relations Government of Madhya Pradesh
- In office 7 December 1993 – 8 December 2003
- Chief Minister: Digvijaya Singh
- Constituency: Garoth-Bhanpura

Vice President Indian National Congress Madhya Pradesh Congress Committee
- Incumbent
- Assumed office 4 September 2015

Member of Madhya Pradesh Legislative Assembly
- In office 1985 – 1990
- Constituency: Garoth-Bhanpura
- In office 1990 – 1993
- Constituency: Garoth-Bhanpura
- In office 1993 – 1998
- Constituency: Garoth-Bhanpura
- In office 1998 – 2003
- Constituency: Garoth-Bhanpura
- In office 2008 – 2013
- Constituency: Garoth-Bhanpura

All India Congress Committee Delegate
- Incumbent
- Assumed office 4 May 1985

Personal details
- Born: 30 March 1952 (age 74) Bhanpura, Madhya Bharat, India
- Spouse: Urmila Sojatia
- Education: Holkar Science College, Indore
- Profession: Politician; Agriculturist
- Website: https://www.sojatiagroup.com/about-us

Subhash Kumar Sojatia (born 30 March 1952) is an Indian politician and former Minister of Home, Health, Industry, Commerce, Medical Education and Public Relations in the Government of Madhya Pradesh. He was born on 30 March 1952 in the small town of Bhanpura, located in the Mandsaur District in the Malwa region of Madhya Pradesh. Sojatia received his education at Holkar Science College.

After completing his studies, Sojatia began his career in politics, joining the Indian National Congress party in the late 1970s. He quickly rose through the ranks of the party, becoming an influential member of the Madhya Pradesh Congress Committee. In 1980, Sojatia was elected as a member of the Madhya Pradesh Legislative Assembly, representing the Garoth-Bhanpura constituency. Since then Sojatia has been a member of the Madhya Pradesh Legislative Assembly 5 times, and has been part of the Cabinet in the Digivijay Singh Congress government for 10 years.

Over the course of his political career, Sojatia has held a number of important roles and responsibilities, including serving as the Minister of Home, Health, Industry, Commerce, Medical Education, and Public Relations in the Government of Madhya Pradesh.

Subhash Kumar Sojatia has also been an active member of the All India Congress Committee (AICC), the highest decision-making body of the Indian National Congress party. He is serving as a delegate for the AICC, representing the Madhya Pradesh region and has been the Vice President of the Madhya Pradesh Congress Committee participating in the development of party policies and strategies.

In addition to his political career, Sojatia is also known for his contributions to literature and culture. In 2014, he published a book titled Malwa ki Sanskratik Virasat evam Paryatan, which explores the culture and heritage of the Malwa region.

Besides his political and literary pursuits, Subhash Kumar Sojatia is also an avid agriculturist with a particular interest in organic farming.

== Personal life ==
Sojatia was born in Bhanpura in Mandsaur District in Madhya Pradesh, India, on 30 March 1952. His father, Dr. Shri Rawatmal Sojatia, was a renowned Doctor, Philanthropist and a Public Figure. His mother is Shrimati Dhairya Prabha Devi Sojatia. He completed his schooling in Bhanpura and received his Bachelor of Science from the Holkar Science College Indore. Sojatia is married to Mrs. Urmila Sojatia, with whom he has 5 children.
