= Bhanpura =

- Town
- Location in Madhya Pradesh, India
- Coordinates: 24.52°N 75.73°E
- Country: India
- State: Madhya Pradesh
- District: Mandsaur
- Elevation: 384 m (1,260 ft)

Population (2001)
  - Total: 16,493

Languages
  - Official: Hindi
- Time zone: UTC+5:30 (IST)
- Vehicle registration: MP-14

Bhanpura is a town and a nagar panchayat in Mandsaur district, located in the state of Madhya Pradesh, India. Bhanpura was discovered by King Bhanu bhil. It was also ruled by the Chandrawats of Mewar during the times of Rana Sanga's rule. The town is home to a number of historic places such as the Daraki-Chattan region, which is one of the world's oldest rock arts, Chaturbhujnath Nala rock art shelters, and the Hinglajgarh Fort. Bhanpura also has a museum that displays the popular arts of Mandsaur, including art from the Gupta era (4th–5th century) until the time of Pratiharas and Parmaras.

== History ==
=== Archaeological evidence ===
The excavation at Daraki-Chattan revealed immense information on the cultural occupation of the site. Daraki-Chattan is a small and narrow cleft or cave in the tall cliff faces of Indragarh Hill in the Vindhya range, overlooking the Rewa river valley. The cave is approximately 1.4 metres (4.6 ft) wide at its mouth, from where it continuously narrows down in width, finally closing at the depth of 8.4 m (28 ft) from its mouth. The cave is approximately 7.4 m (24 ft) in height. It bears more than five hundred deeply patinated cupules on both of its vertical walls. The Daraki-Chattan cupules were discovered by Ramesh Kumar Pancholi in 1992. The Archaeological Survey of India took up Daraki-Chattan region near Bhanpura as a case for the study of early petroglyphs in India, and commenced excavation under Giriraj Kumar in 2002.

Daraki-Chattan reveals the past of an extensive rock art in this cave. The collection of stone artifact assemblage from the excavation undoubtedly reveals that the shelter was occupied by the Acheulean man. The experts studying the petroglyphs claim it to be the "oldest rock art in the world", about 2 to 5 lakh (200,000–500,000) years old.

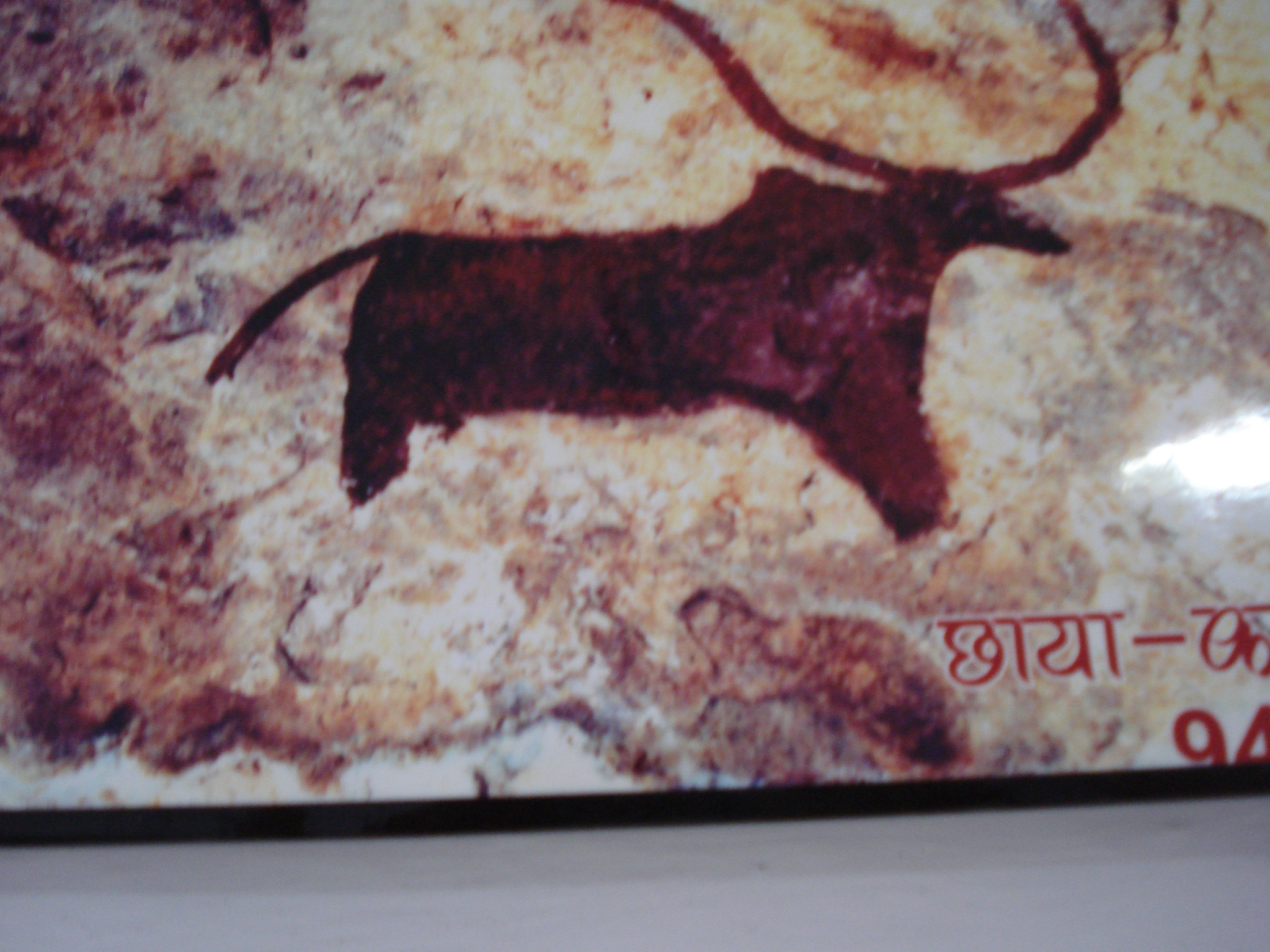
Rock painting in Bhanpura

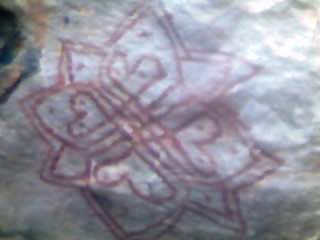
A rock painting at Seeta Khardi near Bhanpura

In order to study the early cupules in India, an international project called "Early Indian Petroglyphs" was established in 2000. It is a joint venture by researchers from Rock Art Society of India (RASI) and Australian Rock Art Association (AURA), under the supervision of the International Federation of Rock Art Organizations (IFRAO), Robert Bednarik and Giriraj Kumar.

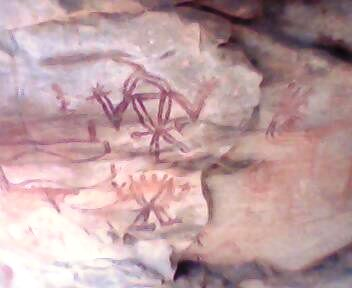
A rock painting at Seeta Khardi near Bhanpura

=== Modern history ===
Bhanpura gets its name from a king named Bhaman. It was ruled by the Chandrawats of Mewar in the 16th century. Chandrawat of Bhanpura held the title of 'Rao'. The Chandrawats descend from Chanda Singh, and were powerful chiefs in Mewar. They migrated from Mewar due to internal strife.

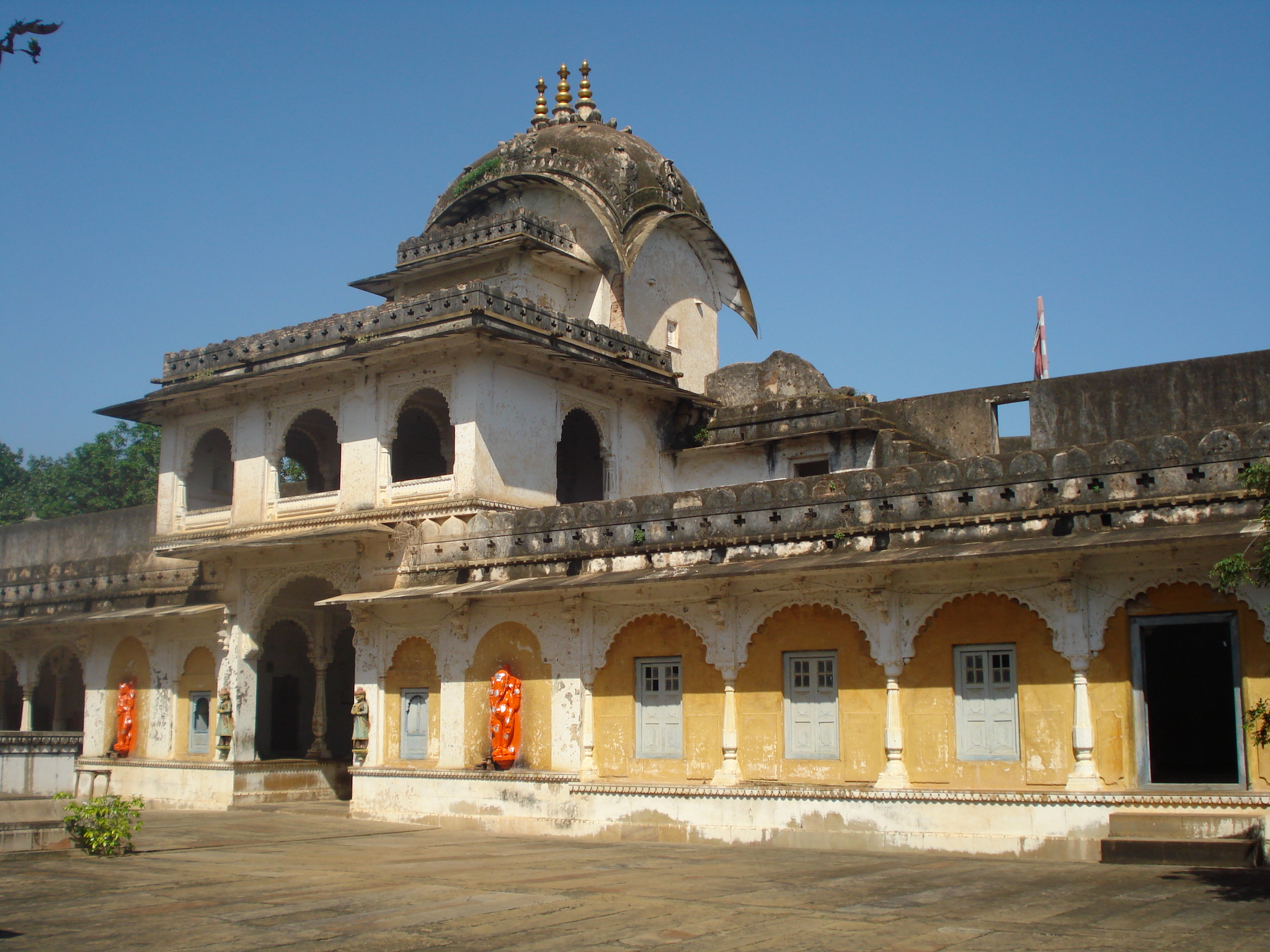
Chhatri of Yashwantrao Holkar in Bhanpura

== Geography ==
Bhanpura is located at 24.52°N 75.73°E. It has an average elevation of 384 metres (1,259 feet). Bhanpura is 127 km (79 mi) north-east of Mandsaur, and south of Hinglajgarh and Navali in Mandsaur district.

== Demographics ==
As of 2001 India census, Bhanpura had a population of 16,493. Males constituted 51% of the population and females 49%. Bhanpura had an average literacy rate of 70%, higher than the national average of 59.5%; with male literacy of 80% and female literacy of 61%. 13% of the population was under 6 years of age.

== Tourism ==
=== Hinglajgarh Fort ===
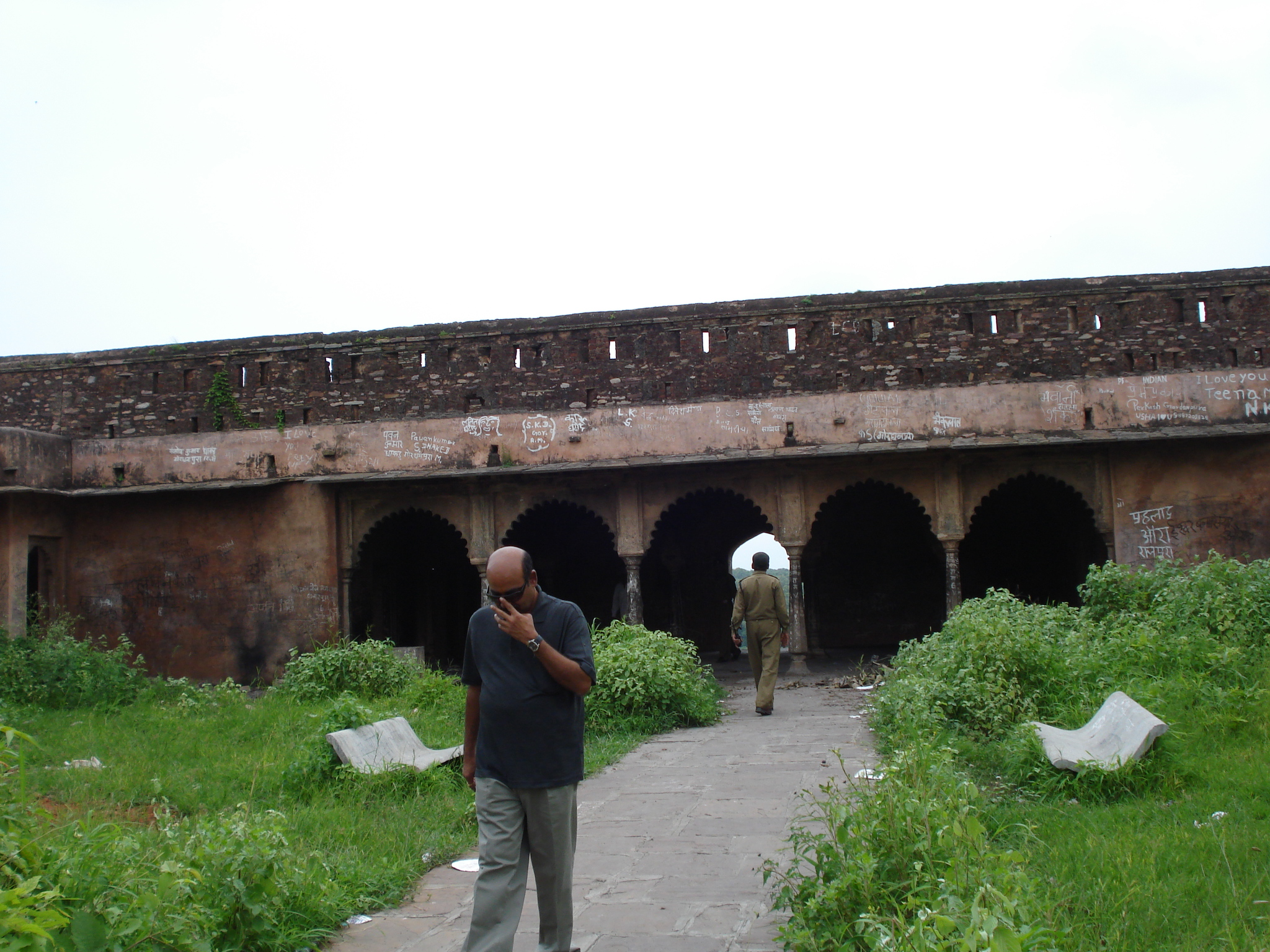
Darbar Hall, Hinglajgarh

Hinglajgarh or Hinglaj Fort is an ancient fort situated near Navali village in the Bhanpura tehsil of Mandsaur district in Madhya Pradesh. It is located at 25°30' N 65°31' E. It is situated at a distance of 165 km (103 mi) from Mandsaur and 26 km (16 mi) from Bhanpura in Madhya Pradesh. This fort was at its peak of grandeur during the Parmara rule. There are many artistic sculptures of various periods in this fort. The Nandi and Uma-Maheshwar sculptures were sent from here to France and Washington for display in Indian festivals. Hinglajgarh has been the centre of excellence in craftsmanship of sculptures for about 800 years. The statues recovered from this fort are from Gupta period to the Parmara period. The most ancient statues are from 4th to 5th century AD.

=== Chaturbhujnath Nala rock art shelters ===
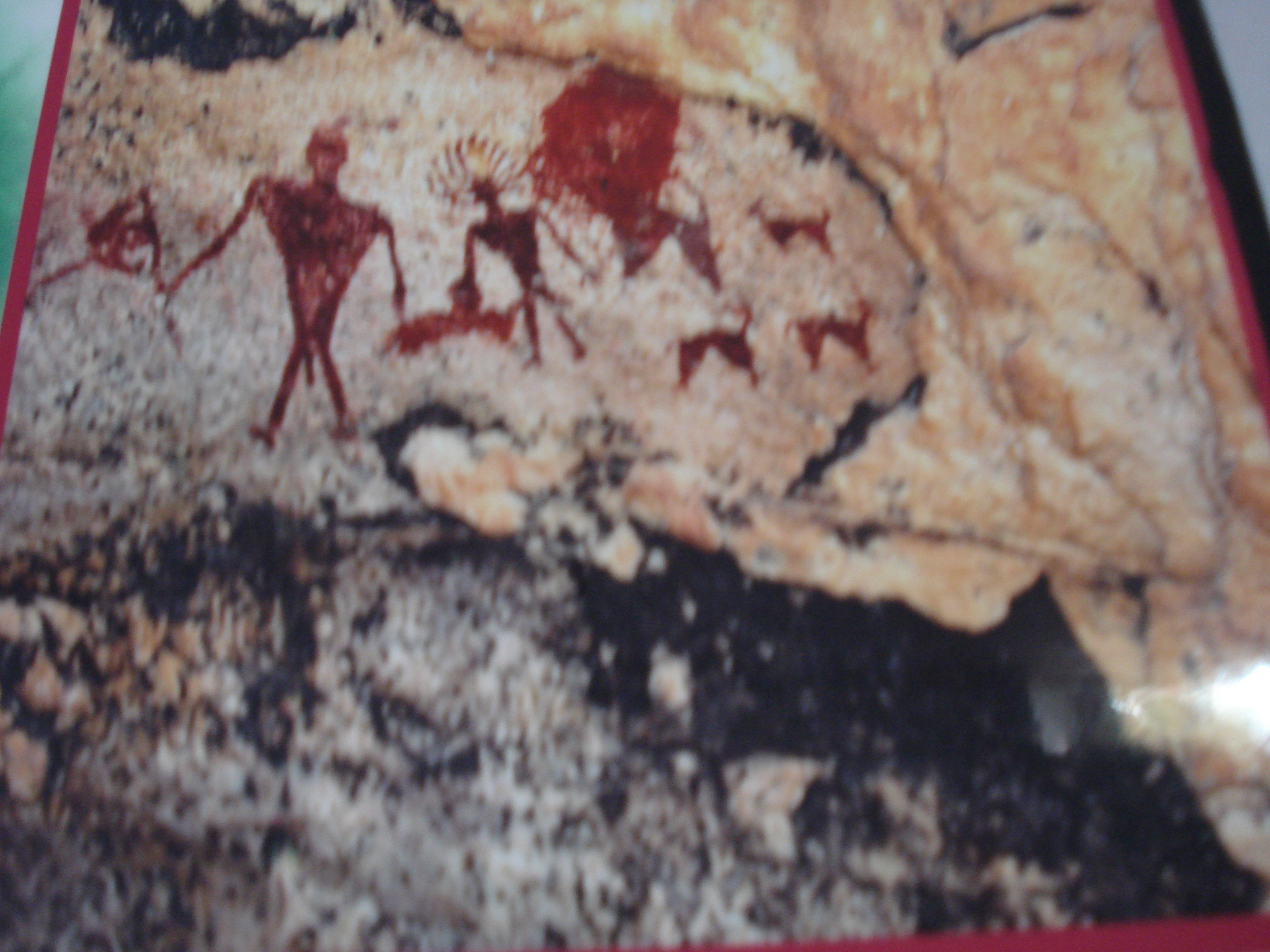
Rock painting in Bhanpura

Chaturbhujnath Nala rock art shelters were discovered in 1973, by Dr. Ramesh kumar pancholi and are one of the Longest Rock Art Galleries in the world. They are situated near the Gandhi Sagar Sanctuary, 30 kilometres (19 mi) from Bhanpura in the Mandsaur district of Madhya Pradesh. It is located along a perennial stream called the Chaturbhujnath Nala, stretching in a 5-kilometre-long (3.1 mi) rock art gallery, with thousands of figures painted on its walls. According to carbon dating, the paintings are around 35,000 years old. The rock shelters differ from the rock caves of Bhimbetka, because they are isolated and relatively narrow.

=== Gandhi Sagar Sanctuary ===
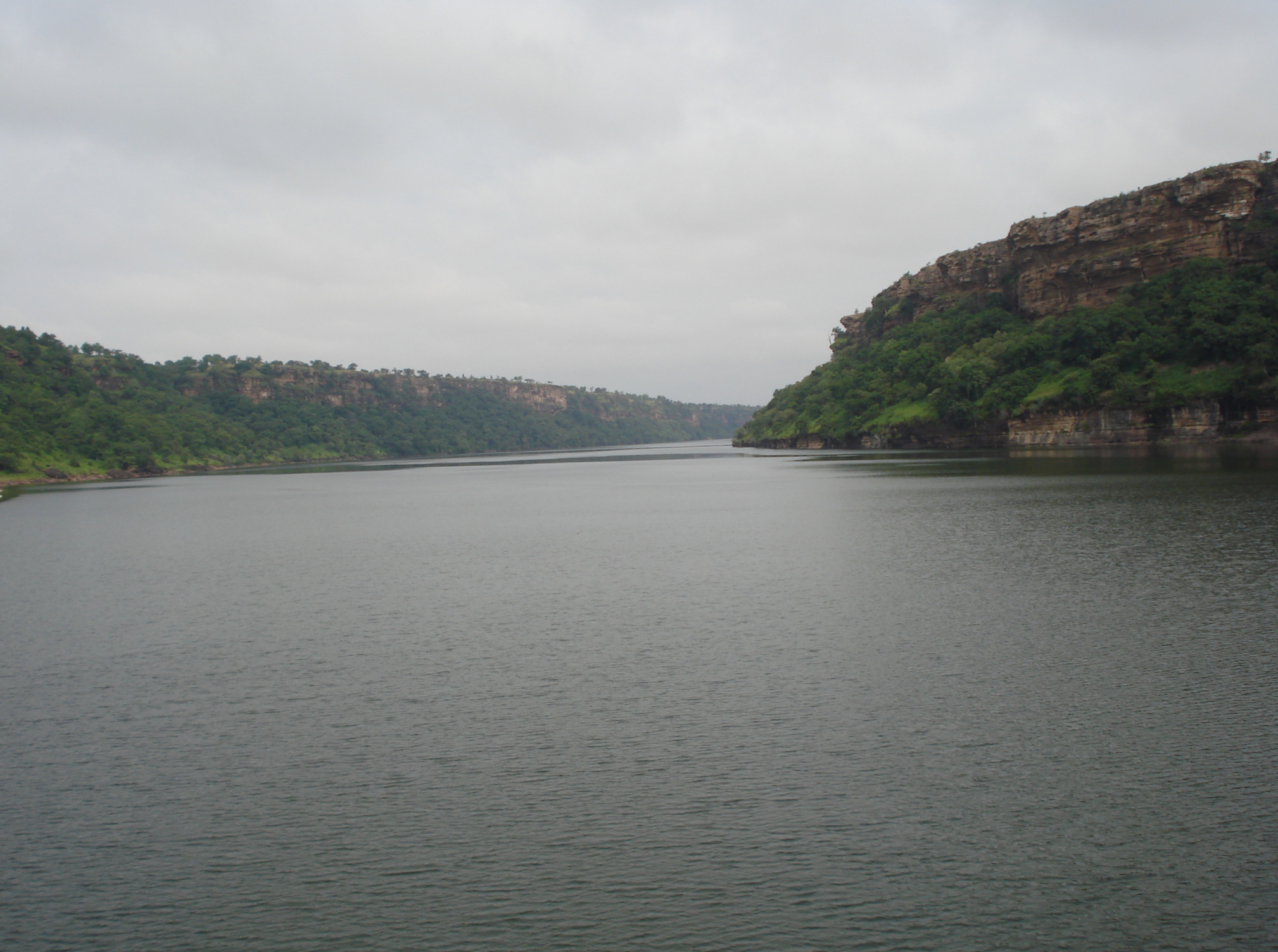
River Chambal in Gandhi Sagar Sanctuary

Gandhi Sagar Sanctuary is a wildlife sanctuary situated on the northern boundary of Mandsaur and Nimach districts in Madhya Pradesh, India. It is spread over an area of 368.62 km^{2} (142 sq mi) adjoining the state of Rajasthan in India. It was created in 1974 and expanded in 1983. The Chambal River passes through the sanctuary and divides it into two parts: the western part is in Nimach district and the eastern is in Mandsaur district.

=== Kethuli Jain Temple ===
Kethuli Jain temple is 21 km (13 mi) from Bhanpura, on the road towards Jhalrapatan. It is a famous 'Atishay Kshetra' attracting Jain pilgrims. The temple has a 500 year-old idol of Tirthankara Parshvanatha.

=== Mini Goa (Village Kanwla / kohla) ===
Village Kanwala is currently in discussion, due to which there is increasing tourism in the village, today this post is about the same place - Village Kanwala is located 8 km west of Bhanpura and is surrounded by the zenith of Mother Chambal. Two huge boulders are located on the banks of Chambal in the south, away from the population area of the village - these boulders are also called "chidi wala stone" in the village due to the beautiful mud houses of the ababil bird. When the west wind prevails, the huge, high waves of Chambal push the sand against the rocks located in the water and shape the edges, thus the sand has accumulated between the edges due to continuous waves. Throughout the day, the waves of Chambal collide with the shores to make them realize their vast nature, by the evening, with the wind, sometimes the enthusiasm of the waves increases, and sometimes when the opposite wind direction, the mother Chambal calms down and gives her softness. During the day, even the wild birds, bringing food for their chicks, leave their homes in the evening and keep circling continuously to register their presence in the sky. On the one hand the sun wants to pour out all the light with its last rays, while on the other hand, a flock of wild birds compete with the sky, thus with the sunset gradually everything starts to calm down.

And then Chambal also subsides, to hit the rocks again the next day... In these two rock blocks, there are also rock paintings made by early humans millions of years ago, which are the part of human history, these rocks.

== Education ==
Bhanpura has several educational institutions. There are many professional computer institutes and industrial training Institutes, and many colleges. Saraswati Vidya Mandir is a Hindi medium school. The residential C.B.S.E. affiliated school of the district is Smt Kamala Saklecha Gyan Mandir, which is situated 4 km (2.5 mi) away from Bhanpura.
