= Garoth Assembly constituency =

Constituency of the Madhya Pradesh legislative assembly in India

Coordinates: 24.33°N 75.65°E

Garoth
- Constituency No. 227 for the Madhya Pradesh Legislative Assembly

Constituency details
- Country: India
- Region: Central India
- State: Madhya Pradesh
- District: Mandsaur
- Lok Sabha constituency: Mandsour
- Established: 1972
- Reservation: None

Member of Legislative Assembly
- 16th Madhya Pradesh Legislative Assembly
- Incumbent Chandar Singh Sisodiya
- Party: Bharatiya Janata Party
- Elected year: 2023
- Preceded by: Devilal Dhakad

Garoth is one of the 230 Vidhan Sabha (Legislative Assembly) constituencies of Madhya Pradesh state in central India.

It is part of Mandsaur District. As of 2018, it is represented by Chandar Singh Sisodiya of the Bharatiya Janata Party.

== Members of the Legislative Assembly ==
Election	Name	Party
1957	Saraswati Devi Sharda	Indian National Congress
1962	Mohanlal Sethia	Jana Sangh
1967	Mohanlal Sethia	Bharatiya Jana Sangh
1972	Kasturchand Chaudhary	Indian National Congress
1977	Ragunandan	Janata Party
1980	Mohanlal Sethia	Bharatiya Janata Party
1985	Subhash Kumar Sojatia	Indian National Congress
1990	Radhe Shyam Mandliya	Bharatiya Janata Party
1993	Subhash Kumar Sojatia	Indian National Congress
1998	Subhash Kumar Sojatia	Indian National Congress
2003	Rajesh Yadav	Bharatiya Janata Party
2008	Subhash Kumar Sojatia	Indian National Congress
2013	Rajesh Yadav	Bharatiya Janata Party
2018	Devilal Dhakad	Bharatiya Janata Party
2023	Chandar Singh Sisodiya	Bharatiya Janata Party

== Election results ==
=== 2023 ===
2023 Madhya Pradesh Legislative Assembly election: Garoth
Party	Candidate	Votes	%	±%
BJP	Chandar Singh Sisodiya	108,602	52.81	+10.88
INC	Subhash Kumar Sojatia	90,495	44.0	+3.24
NOTA	None of the above	1,949	0.95	−0.42
Majority		18,107	8.81	+7.64
Turnout		205,658	82.18	+2.58
BJP hold		Swing		

=== 2018 ===
2018 Madhya Pradesh Legislative Assembly election: Garoth
Party	Candidate	Votes	%	±%
BJP	Devilal Dhakad	75,946	41.93	
INC	Subhash Kumar Sojatia	73,838	40.76	
Independent	Tufansingh Sisodiya Barkhedi Mitthu	18,148	10.02	
BSP	Jagdish Rangotha	1,696	0.94	
Bahujan Sangharsh Dal	Ramkaran Ralotiya	1,673	0.92	
NOTA	None of the above	2,474	1.37	
Majority		2,108	1.17	
Turnout		181,147	79.6	
BJP gain from		Swing		

== See also ==
- Garoth
