= Dhamnar Caves =

Caves in Madhya Pradesh, India

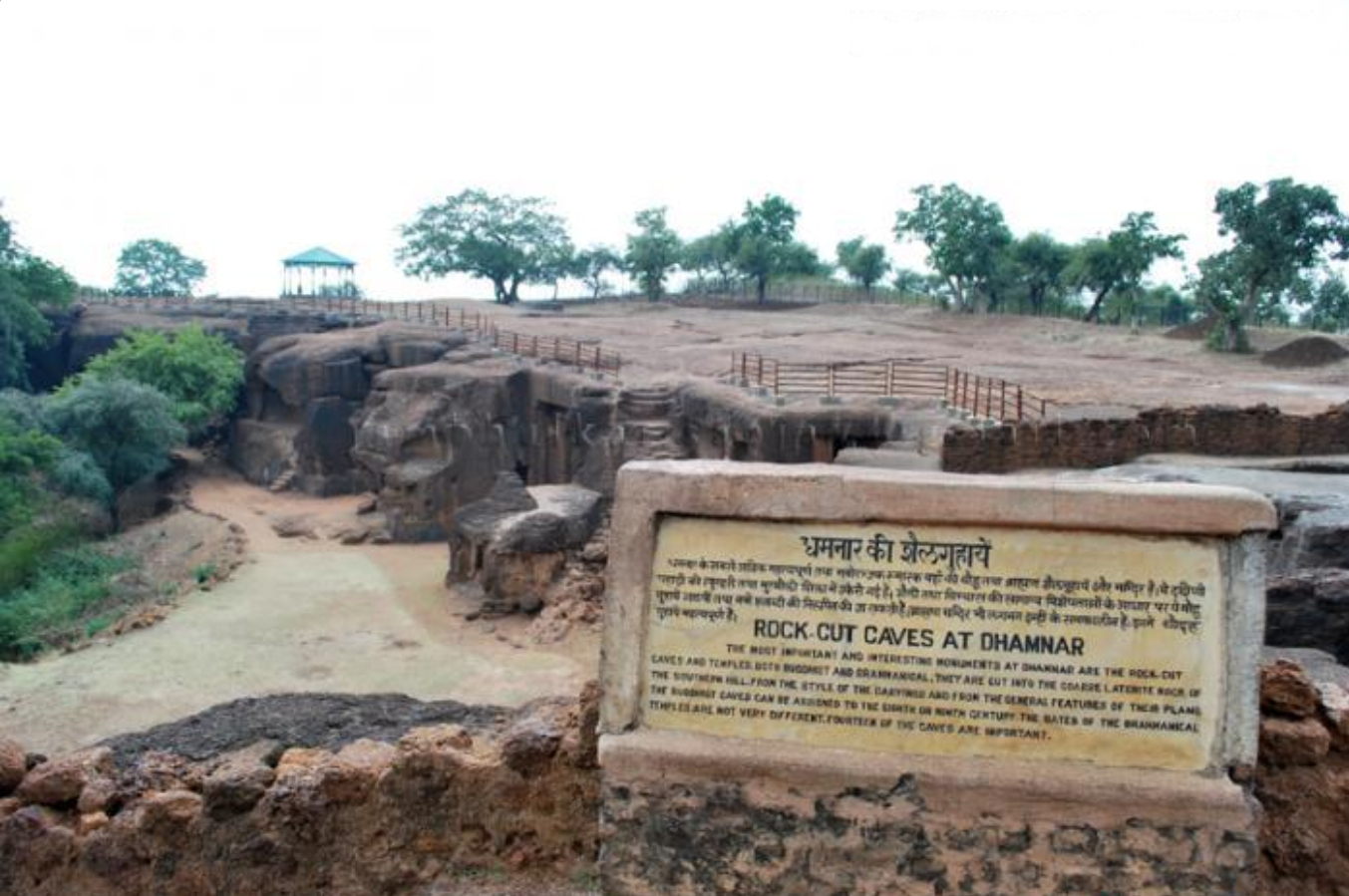
- Overview of the Dhamnar Caves at Chandwasa in Mandsaur district.

- Location within India
- 24°11′35″N 75°29′53″E
- Type: Buddhist caves

The Dhamnar Caves are caves located in the village of Dhamnar, located in Mandsaur district in the state of Madhya Pradesh, India. This rock cut site consists of 51 caves, stupas, Chaityas, passages, and compact dwellings, carved in the 7th century CE. The site includes large statues of Gautama Buddha in sitting and Nirvana mudra.

Fourteen caves on the northern side are considered historically significant, among which Bari Kacheri (big courthouse) and Bhima Bazar are the most so. The Bari Kacheri cave measures 20 feet square and includes stupas and chaityas. The porch includes stone railing with the wooden architecture. Bhima Bazar cave is the largest among the group, measuring 115 feet by 80 and including vihara and chaityagriha. It consists of stupas. The roof is in poor condition with the support of wooden architecture.

== Architecture ==
The Dhamnar caves include 51 rock cut caves containing Buddhist structures like stupas, chaityas, porch and small chambers both of Hinayana and Mahayana sects of Buddhism constructed around 5th-6th centuries AD.

This structure includes colossal seating figure of Buddha and it also includes Brahminical rock cut caves (7th-8th century AD) and a single monolithic temple dedicated to Lord Vishnu (8th-9th century AD).

The structure was crumbling before its restoration by Archeological Survey of India mainly because of being constructed by porous laterite rocks which got weathered badly over the centuries, destabilizing and weakening the structure.

== Gallery ==
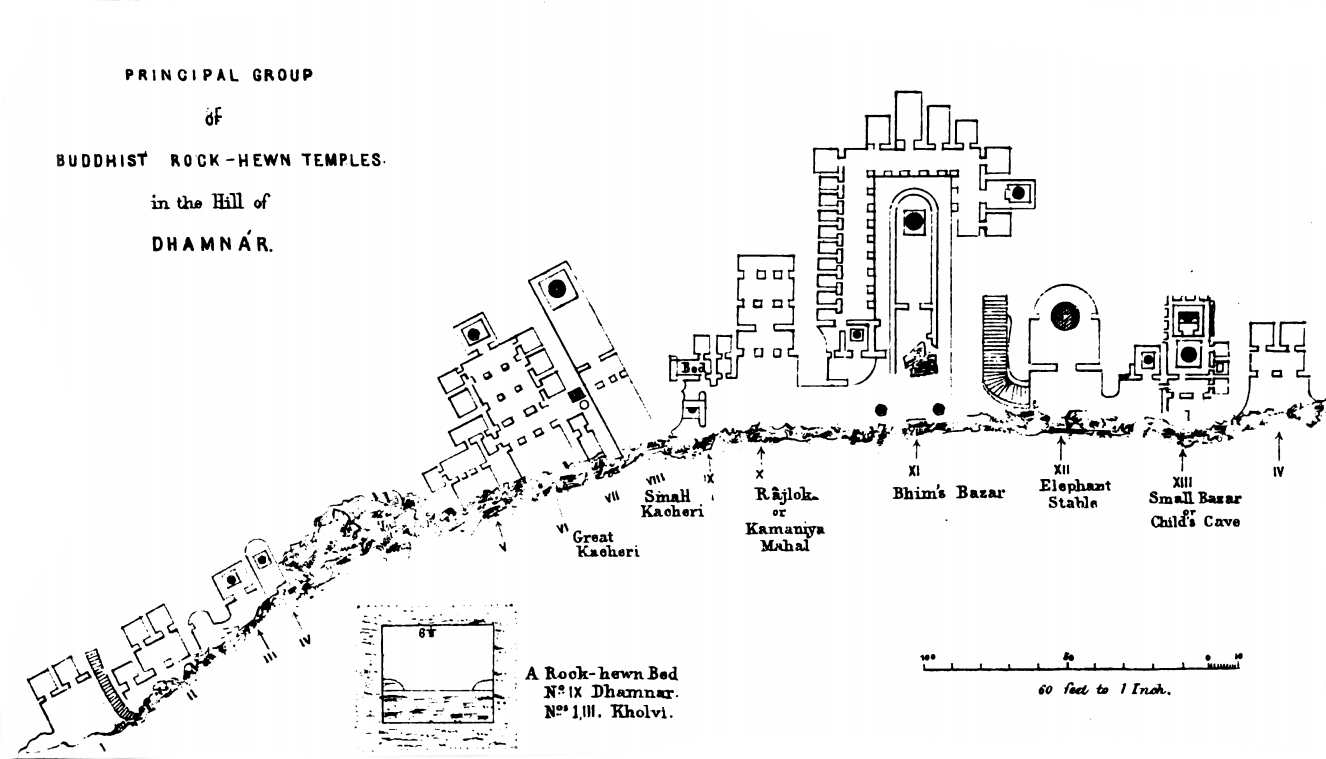
Dhamnar Caves plan

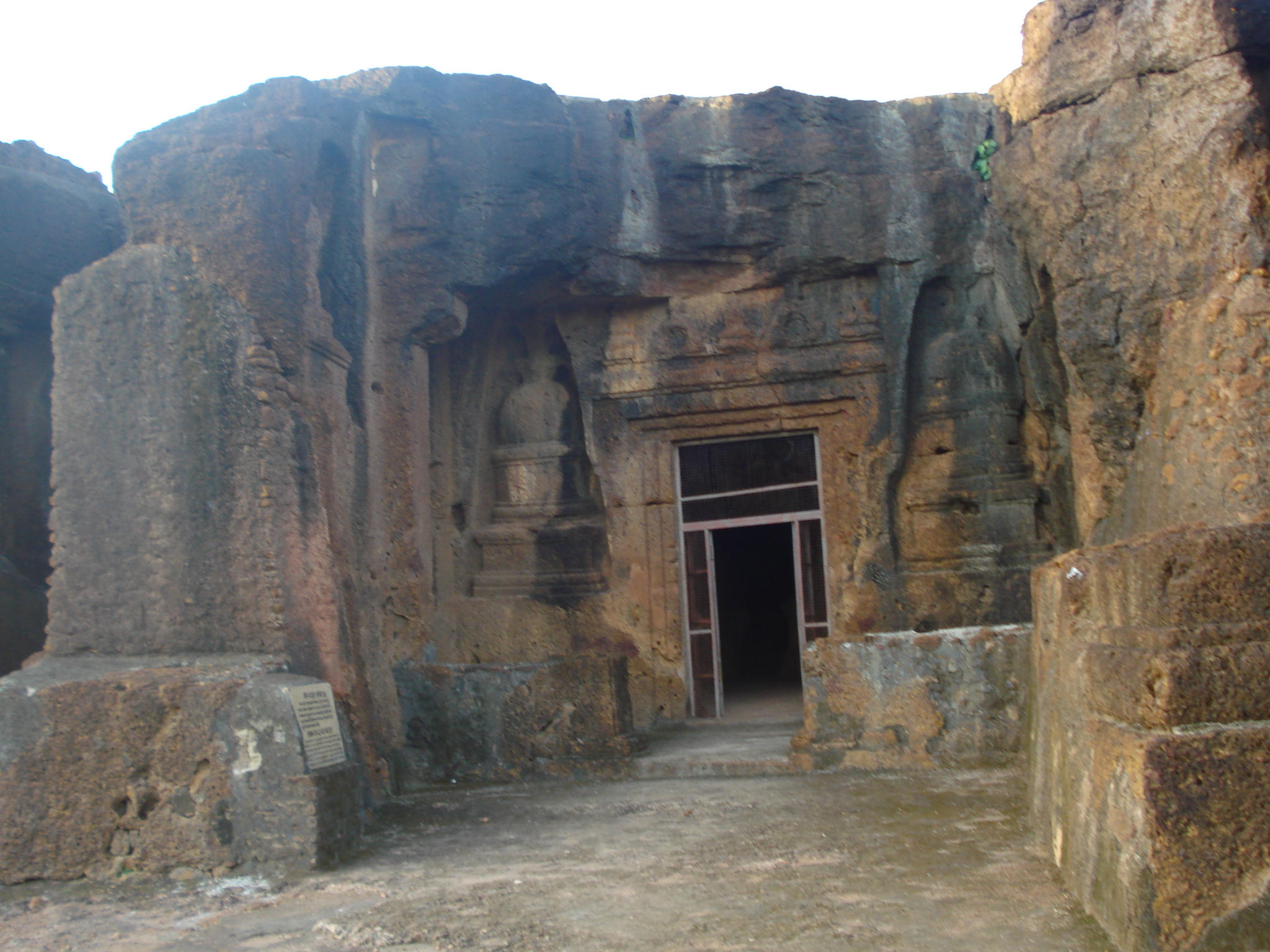
The caves.

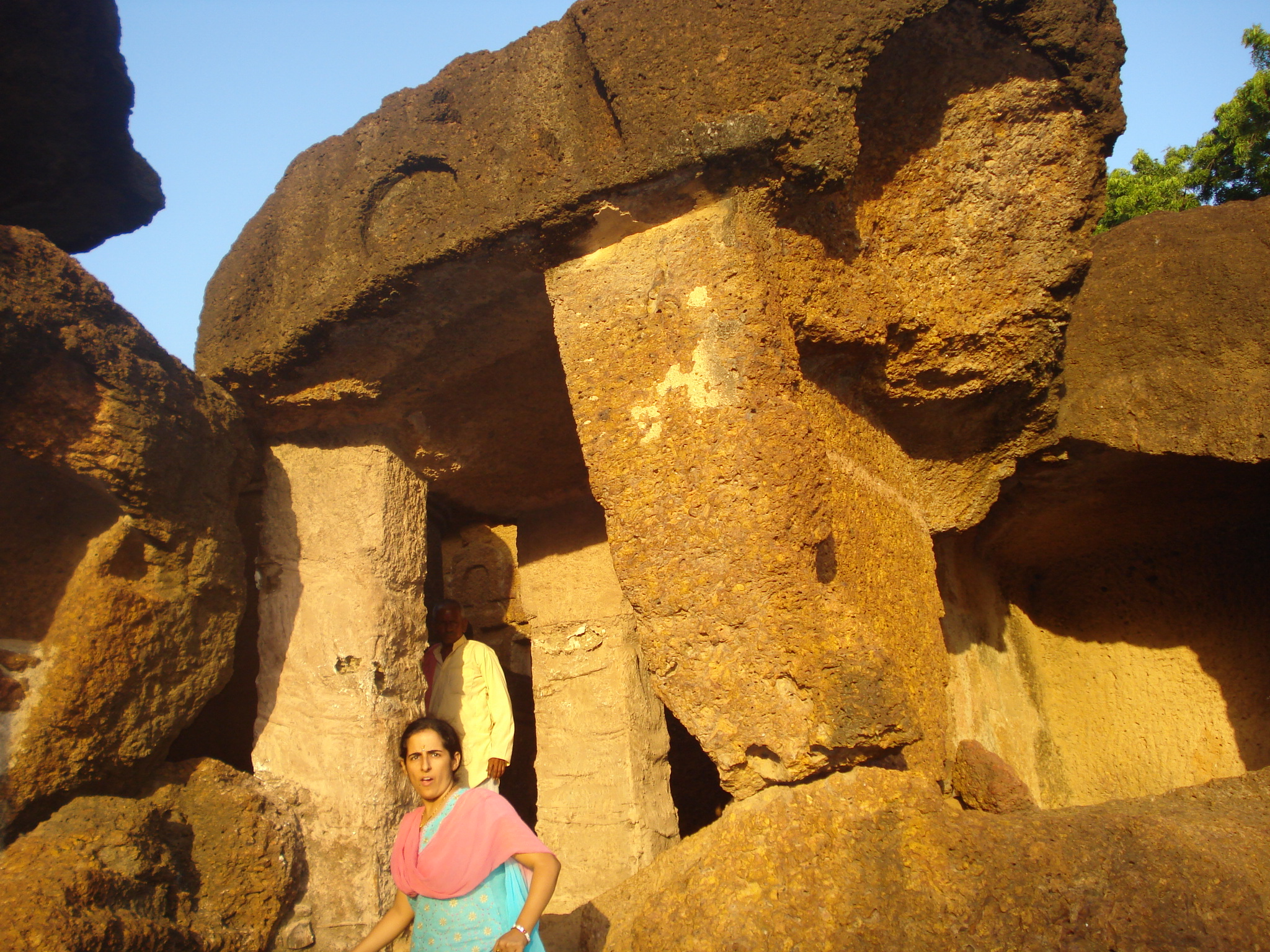
Rock cut Dhamnar caves

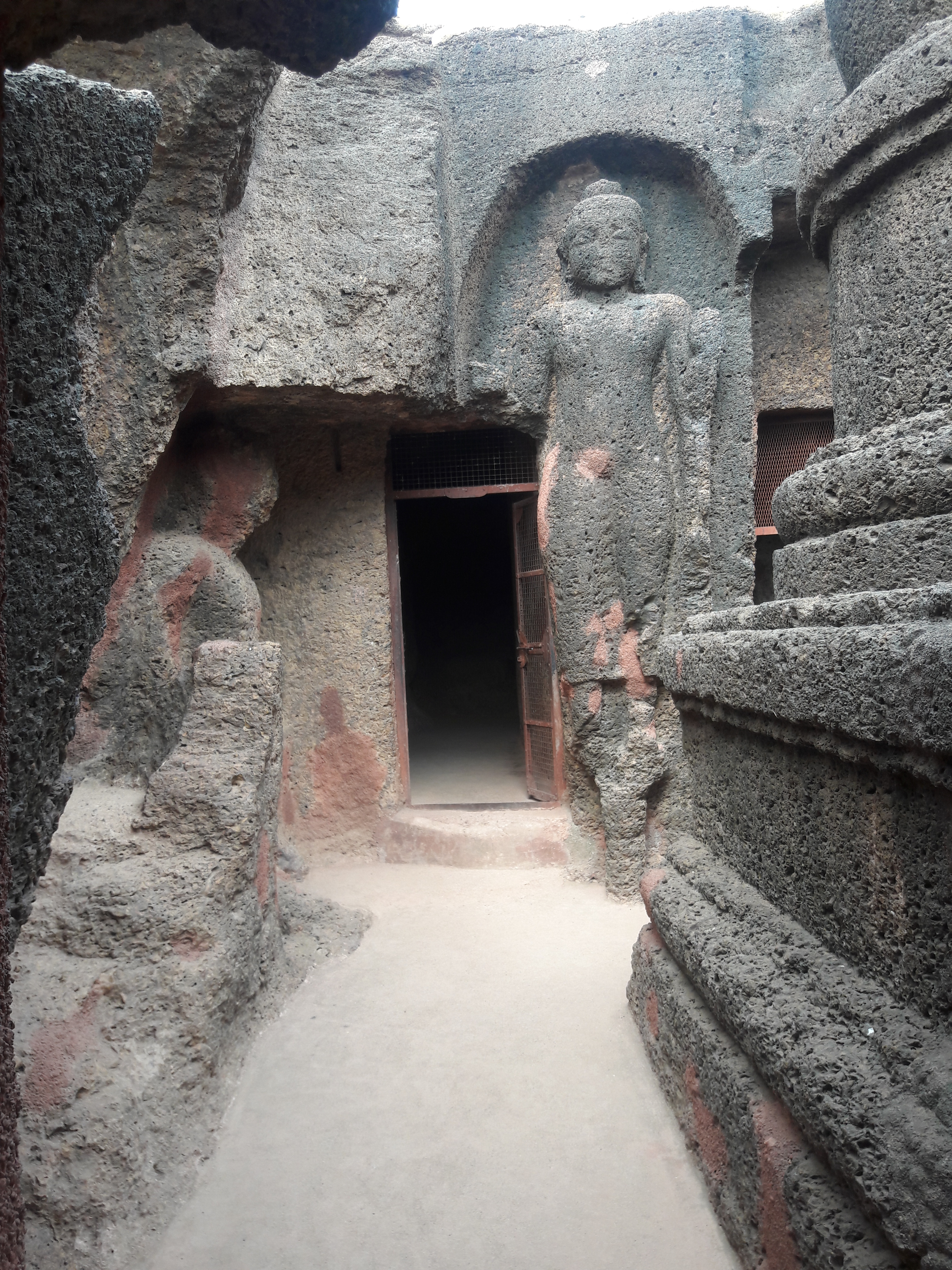
Buddhist sculpture caves

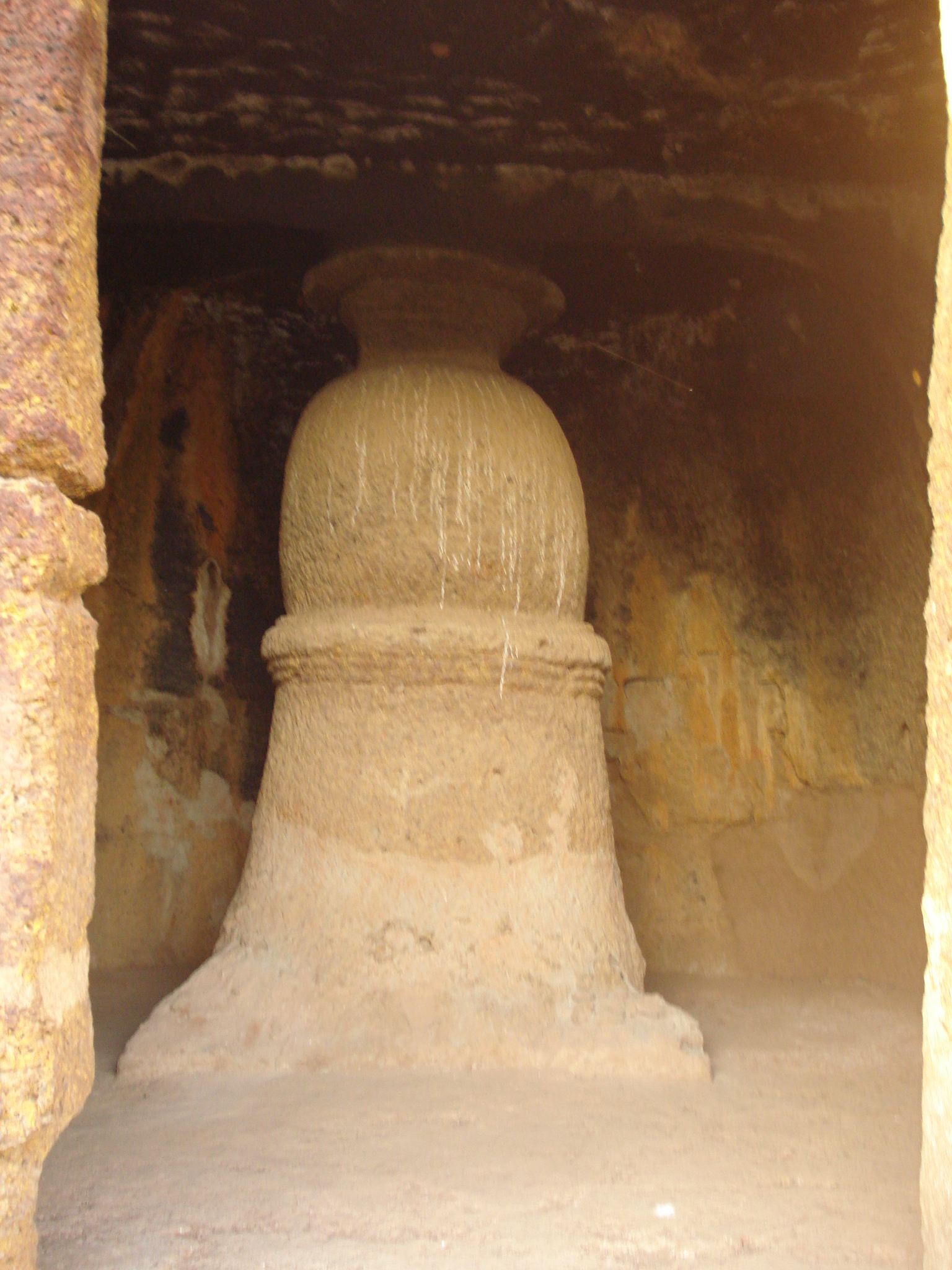
Dhamnar caves

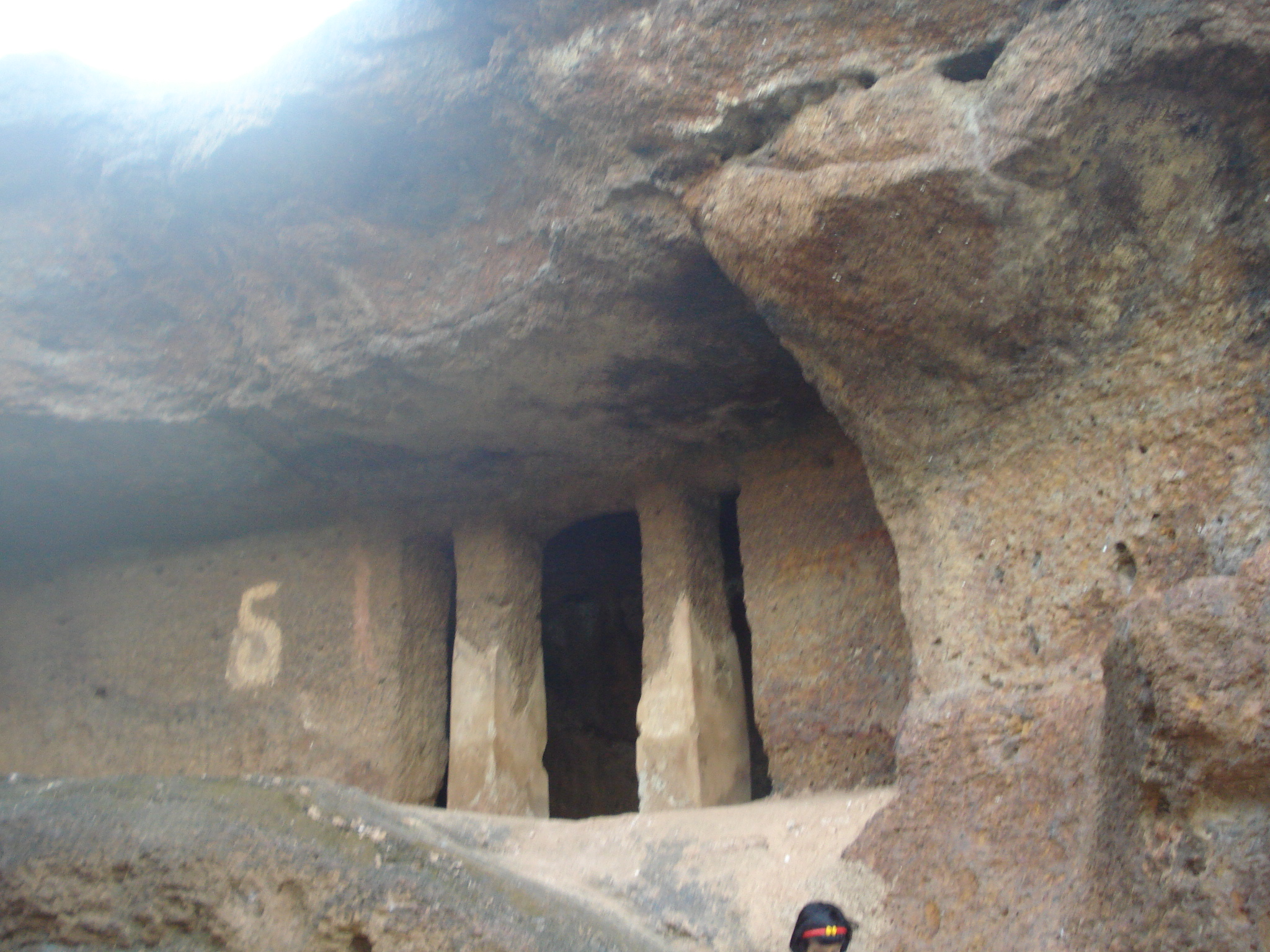
Badi Kachahari (Cave-6)

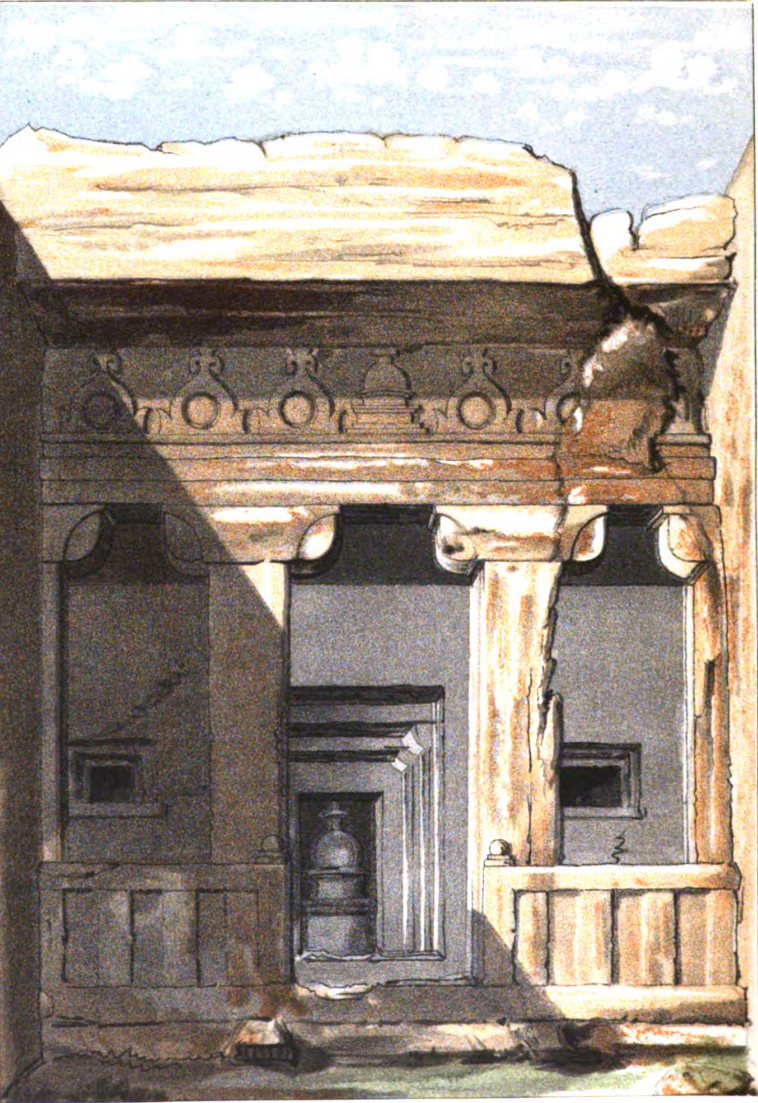
Dhamnar Caves facade

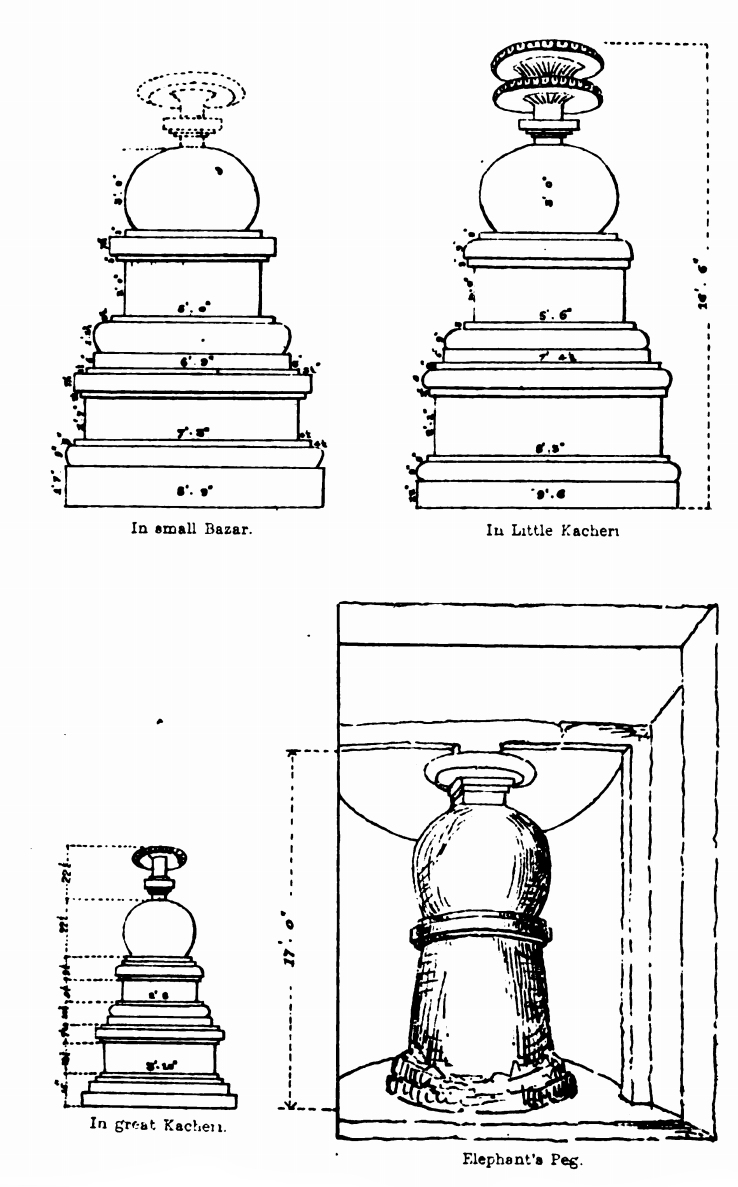
Dhamnar Caves stupas

== See also ==
- Dharmrajeshwar
