= Hinglajgarh =

- Madhya Pradesh, India
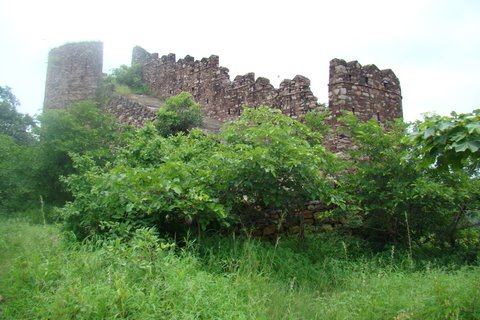

Site information
- Type: Fort
- Owner: Bhil Dynasty Marwari; Paramara Dynasty; Hadu; Chandrawats Holkar Dynasty (Maratha Empire)
- Open to the public: Yes

Location
- Coordinates: 24.40°N 75.47°E

Site history
- In use: Yes
- Events: Numerous

Hinglajgarh is an ancient fortress in Navali, Mandsaur District, Madhya Pradesh, India. The fortress has been controlled by multiple rulers, and has been rebuilt and revamped throughout the ages. The name Hinglajgarh comes from the Goddess Hinglaj Devi: a temple dedicated to her is located on the southern portion of the fortress. The site has also been described as a fortress city.

== Geography ==
The fortress is located on the catchment area of the Chambal River, as well as its rivulets, the Mandaleshwari Nulla and Txakeshwar Nulla, effectively encircling the fort and providing protection from an invading force. It is covered with a deep vegetation.

== History ==
This fort has its origins with the Mauri, or Marwari people, who established the fort. Several statues are located within the fortress from the 4th and 5th century CE. Many of these statues are from the Gupta Period to the Parmara Period. These statues are considered to be of high quality, and have been displayed in the Central Museum of Indore. Some sculptures like a Nandi sculpture and a Uma-Maheshawar sculpture were exhibited at the India Display Festival in Washington.

The Paramara Dynasty controlled Hinglajgarh, and was renovated in the 12th century CE. During Paramara rule, Hinglajgarh was the host of many artistic sculptures and statues. In the year 1281, the Hada King Halu occupied Hinglajgarh. Afterwards, the fortress came under the Chandrawats (Chundawats) of Rampura as a Haveli. Laxman Singh Chandrawat, a Chandrawat ruler, was defeated by Queen Ahilya Bai of the Holkars in 1773, thus coming under the control of the Maratha Empire. Ahilya Bai rebuilt the fort and performed maintenance on the surrounding temples dedicated to Hinglaj Devi, Rama and Shiva. The fort was subsequently revamped again under Maharaja Yashwantrao Holkar.

== Structure ==
Most of the ruins of the fortress can be traced back to its control by the Chandrawats or the Holkars of the Maratha Empire. The fortress contains 4 gates. Patanpol, Surajpol. and Katrapol all face to the east, while Mandleshwaripol faces to the west. A reservioir called Surajkund exists near Surajpol, which happens to be the only water body near the fort. A small palace called Rani Mahal is within the fort, and was repaired during the renovation of the fort by Ahilya Bai. A Kachhari (courthouse) called Darbar Kaksha is also located within the fortress. Two lighthouses, or Tirthams, are in the fortress, and send information through light. A watchtower called Fateh Burj was also constructed.

Several temples are located here dedicated to Shiva, Rama and Hanuman, and Hinglaj Devi, who is the origin of the name Hinglajgarh.

== Gallery ==
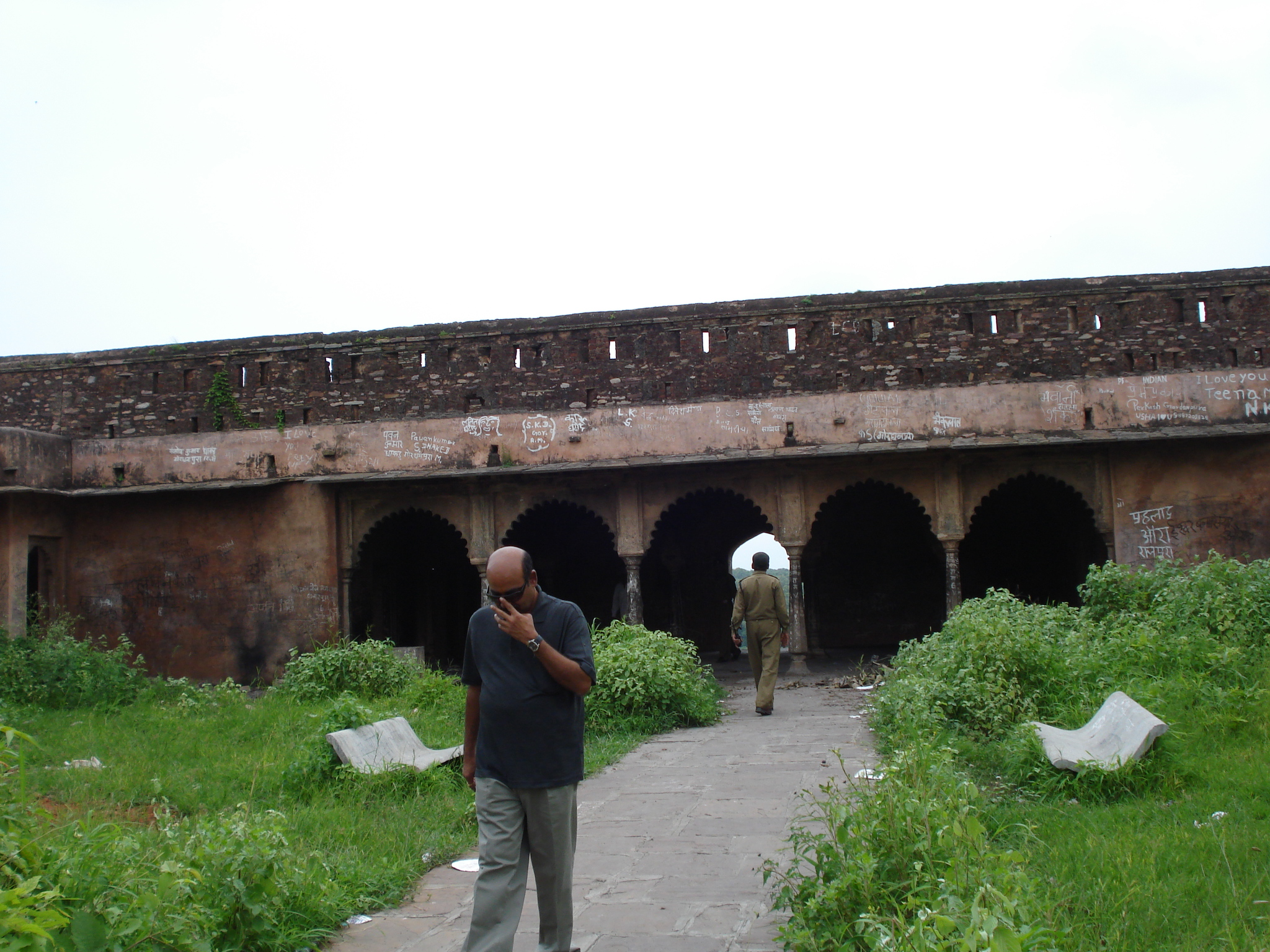
The Kachari, or Royal Court

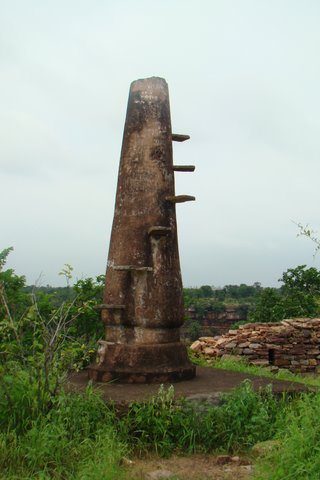
The Tirtham, or lighthouse signaling post

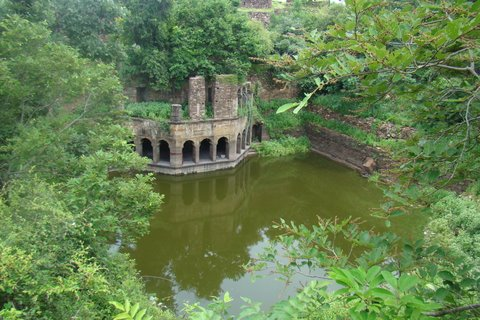
The Sujarkund reservoir opposite to Sujarpol

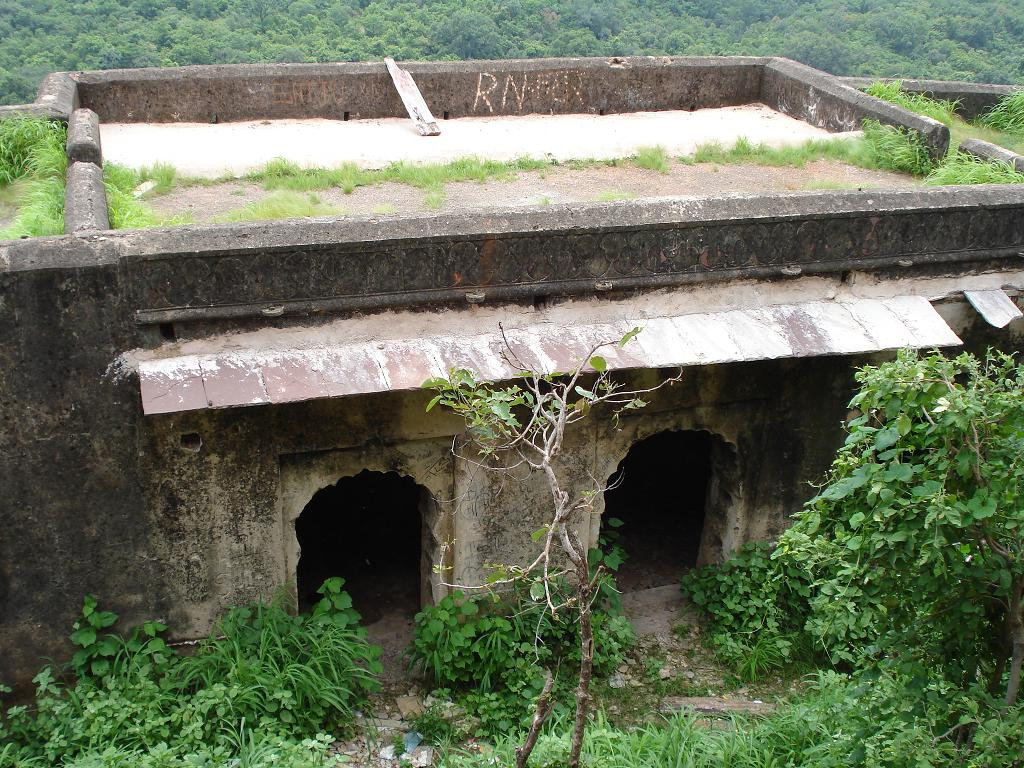
The Rani Mahal palace repaired by Queen Ahilya Bai

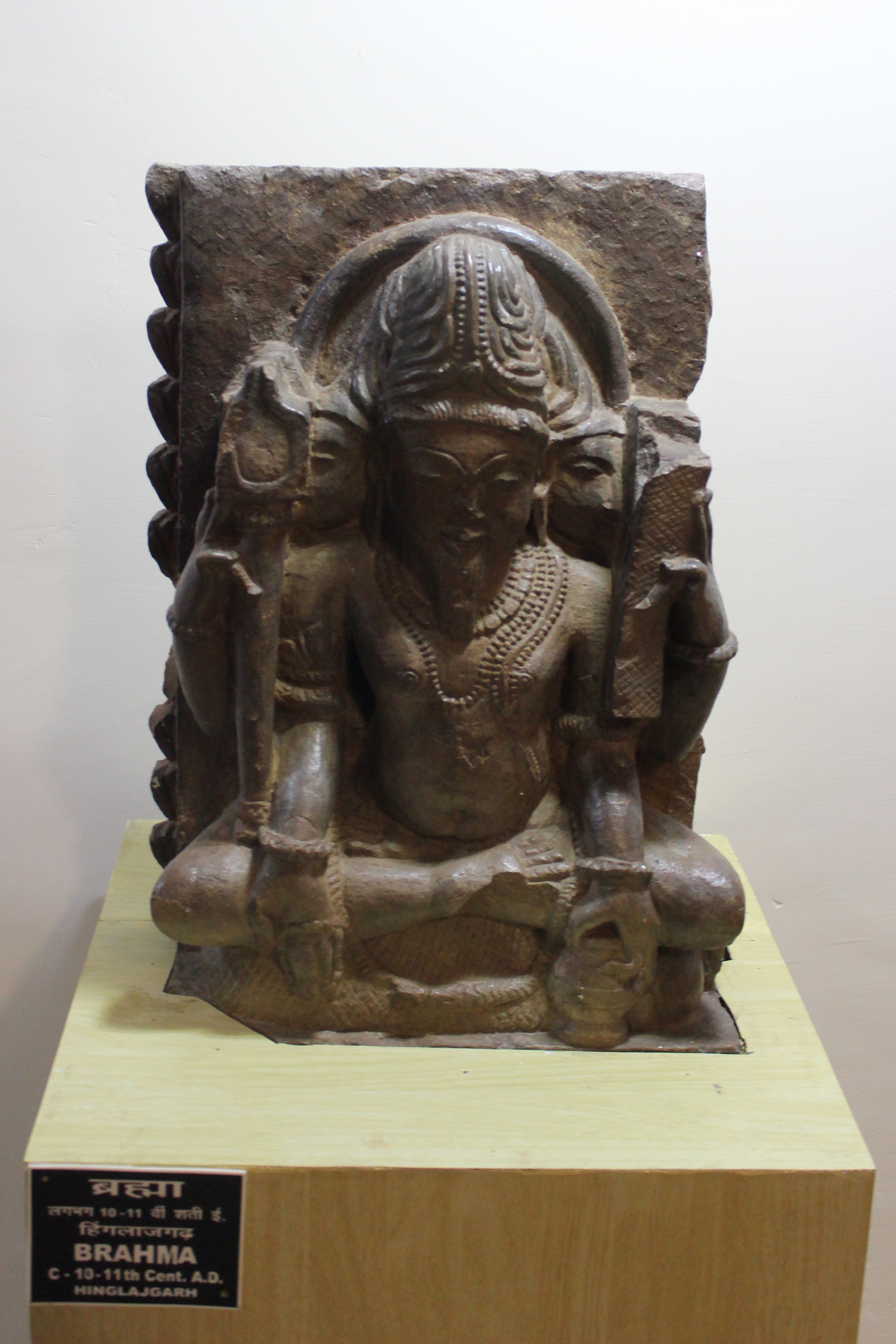
A sculpture of Brahma located from the fortress

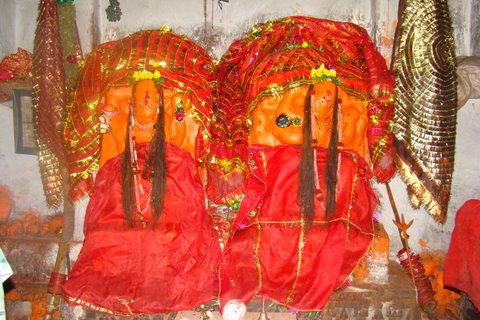
The idol of Hinglajgarh Devi in her temple near the fort
