= Dharmrajeshwar =

Ancient cave temple site in Madhya Pradesh, India

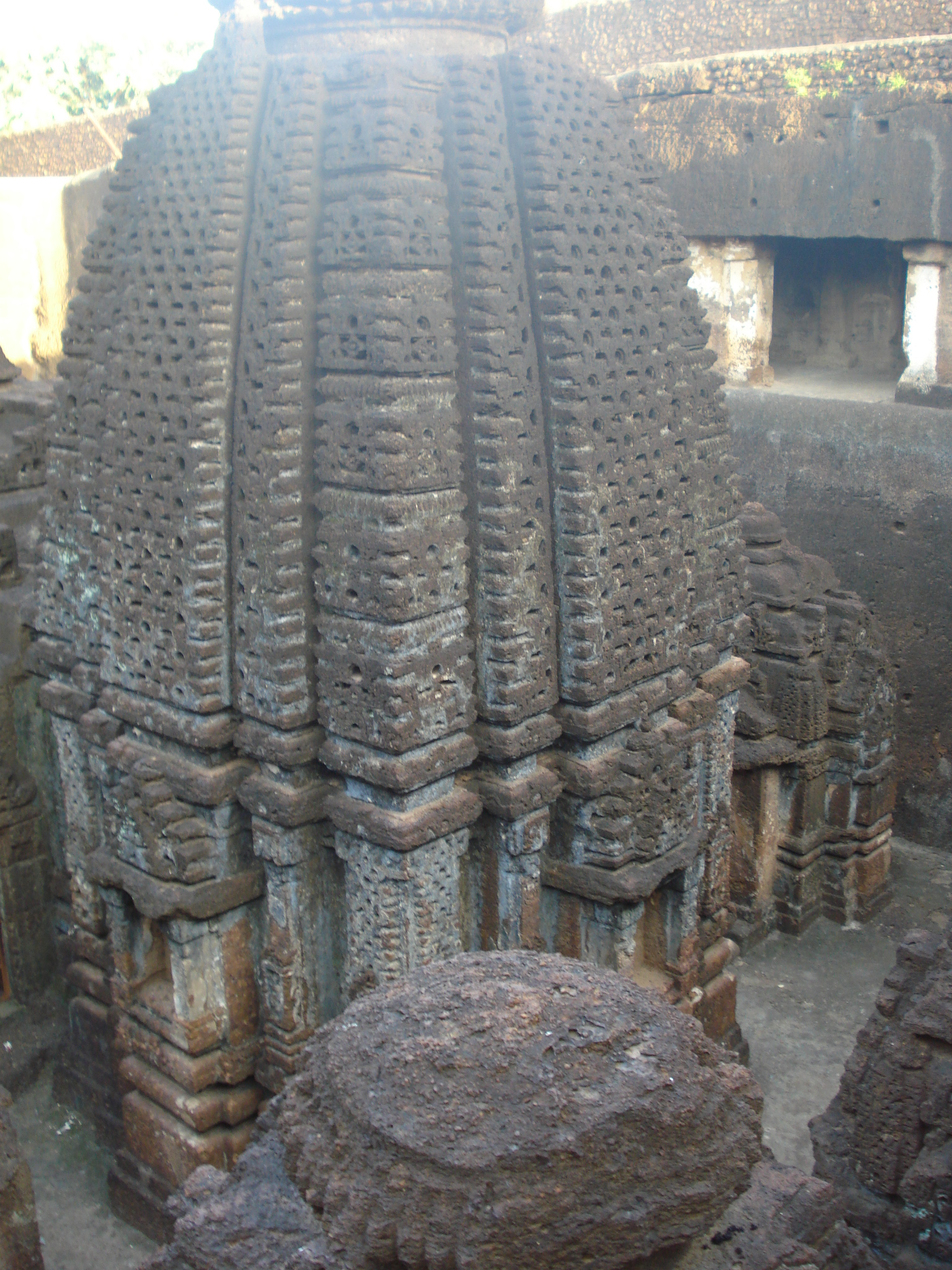

- Location in Madhya Pradesh Dharmrajeshwar (India)

Religion
- Affiliation: Hinduism
- District: Mandsaur

Location
- Location: Shamgarh tehsil
- State: Madhya Pradesh
- Country: India
- Interactive map of Dharmrajeshwar
- Coordinates: 24°11′38.22″N 75°29′56.42″E

Architecture
- Type: Indian rock-cut architecture
- Completed: 8th century

The Dharmarajeshwara temple is a rock-cut temple site 100kms from Mandsaur in Madhya Pradesh, India. The complex features well-preserved Hindu shrine and bears some resemblance to the rock-cut heritage sites at Ellora, Maharashtra.

The temple complex dates to the 8th century and initially featured a shrine dedicated to Vishnu but was later remodelled as a Shiva temple. Consequently, the sanctum sanctorum features both an icon of Harihara as well as a Shivalinga. The Mahashivaratri is the primary festival celebrated at Dharmarajeshwara.

== Picture gallery ==
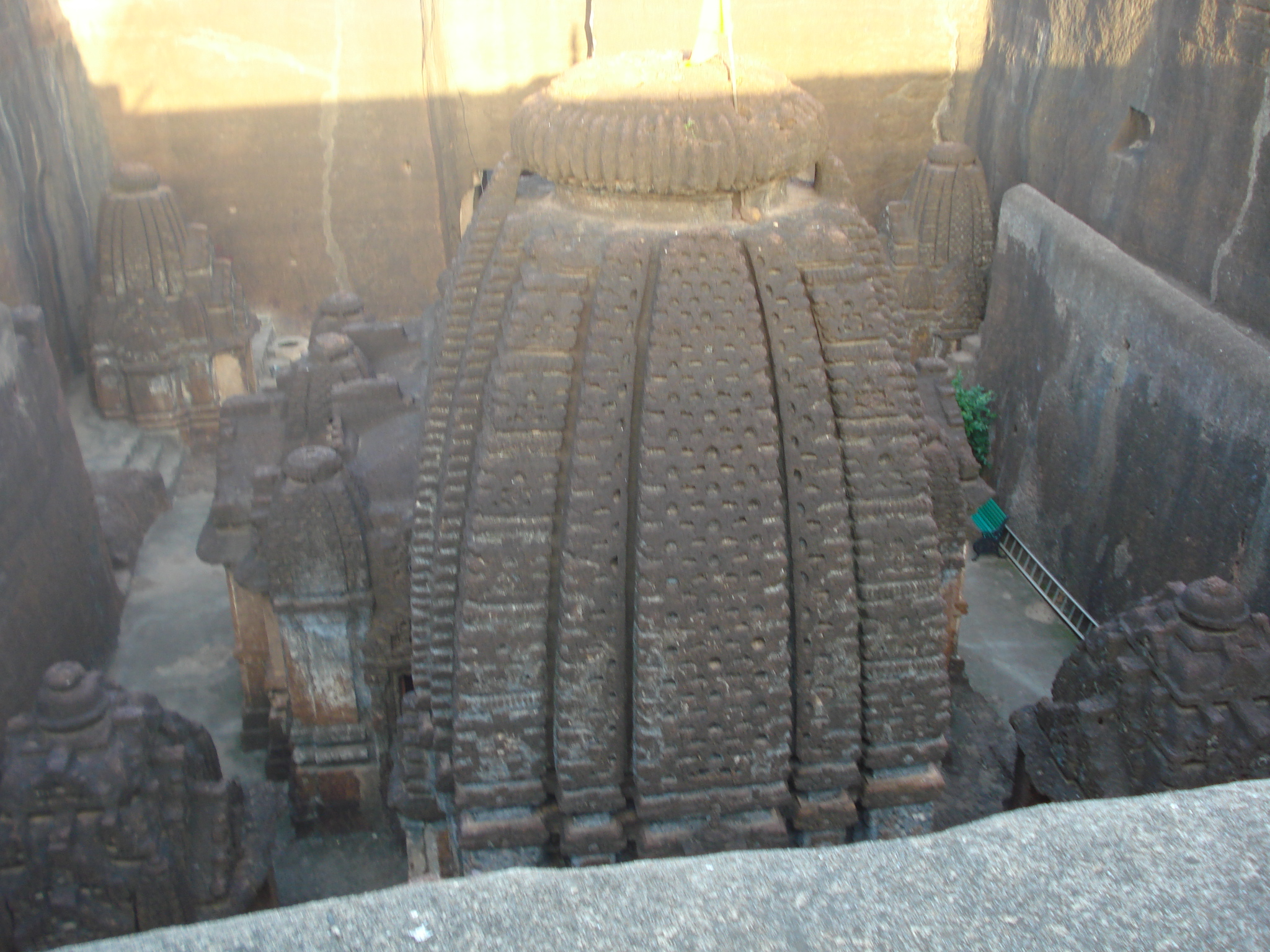
Dharmarajeshwara temple

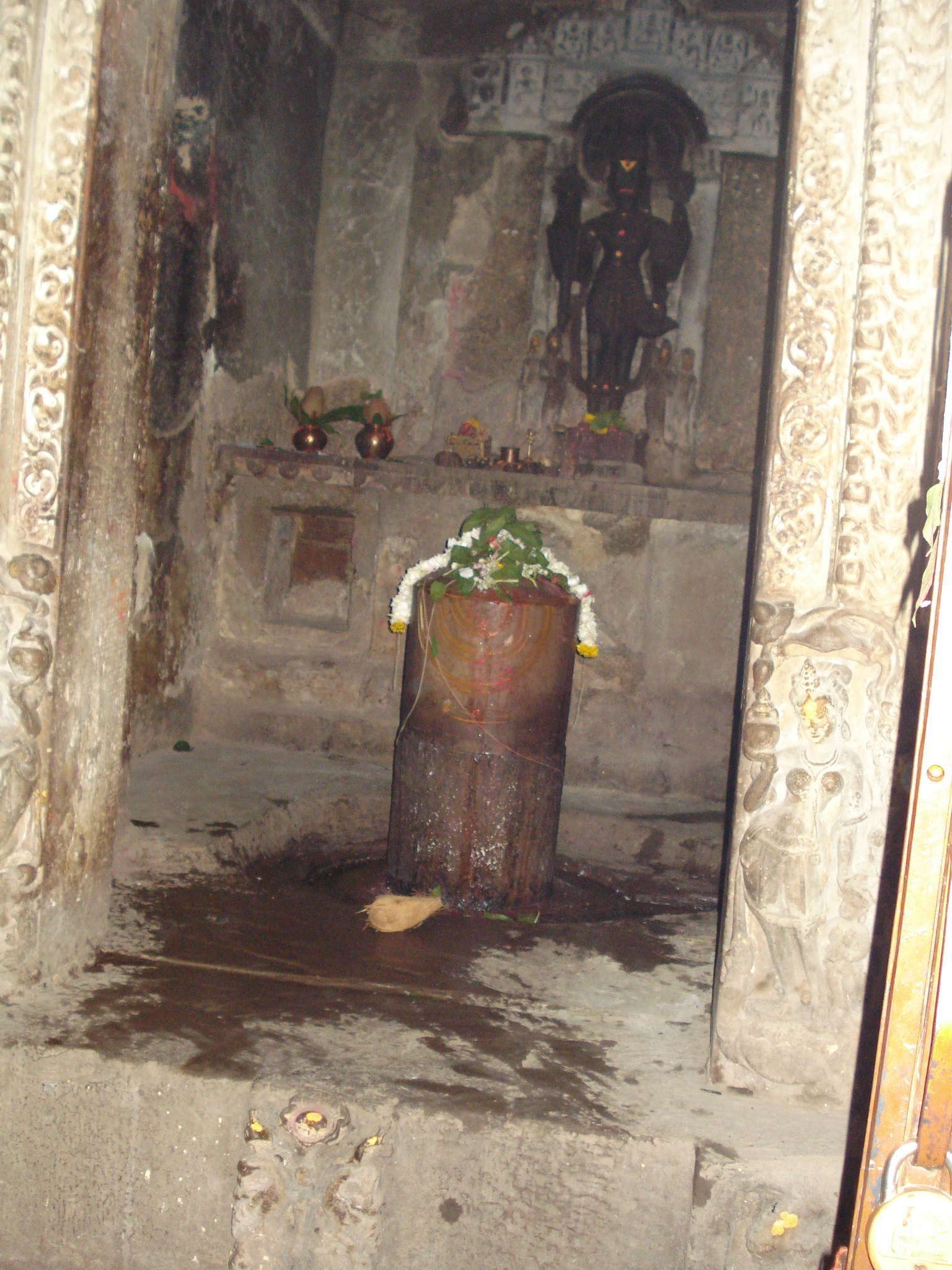
Shivalinga

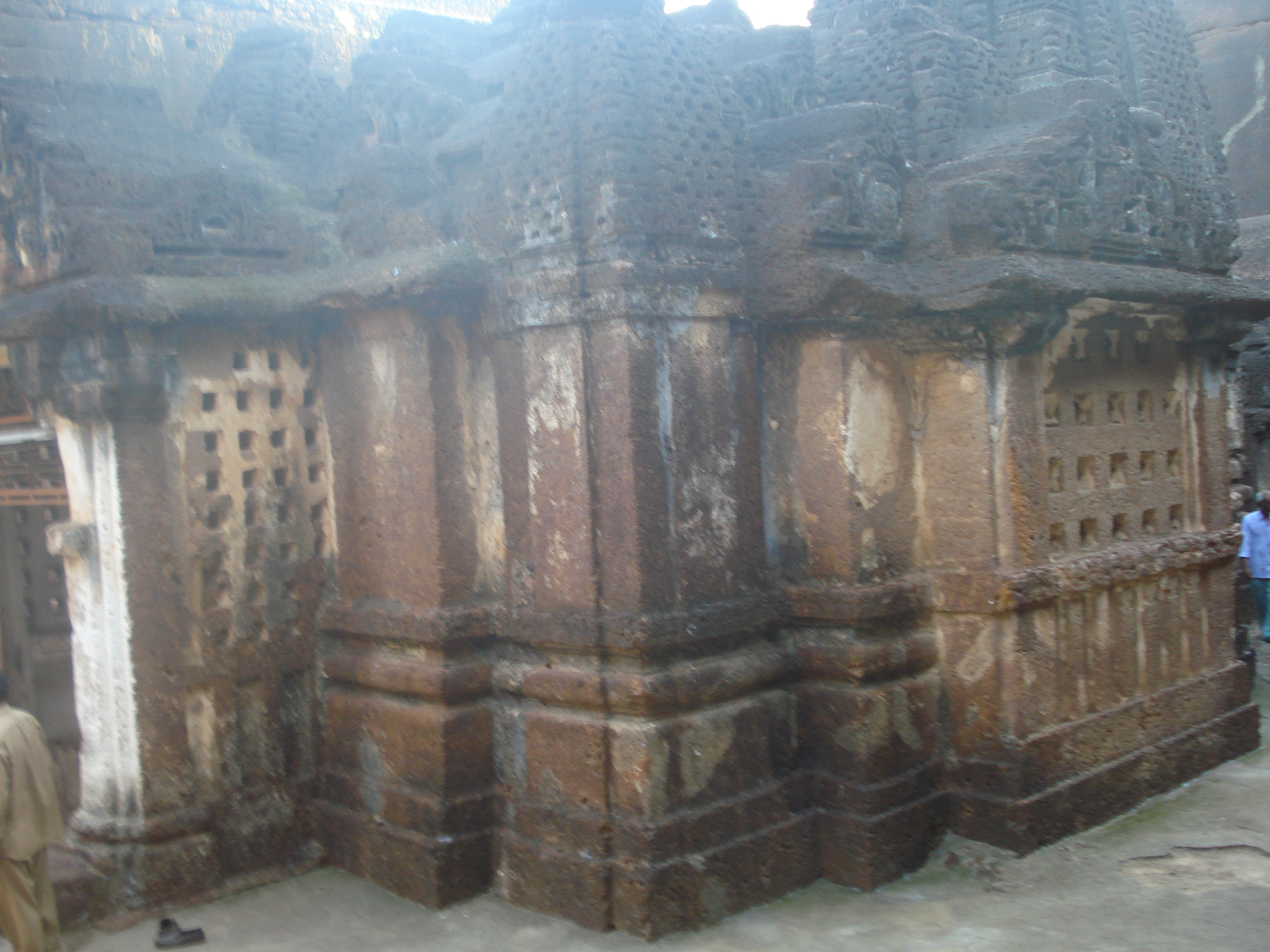
Dharmarajeshwara temple

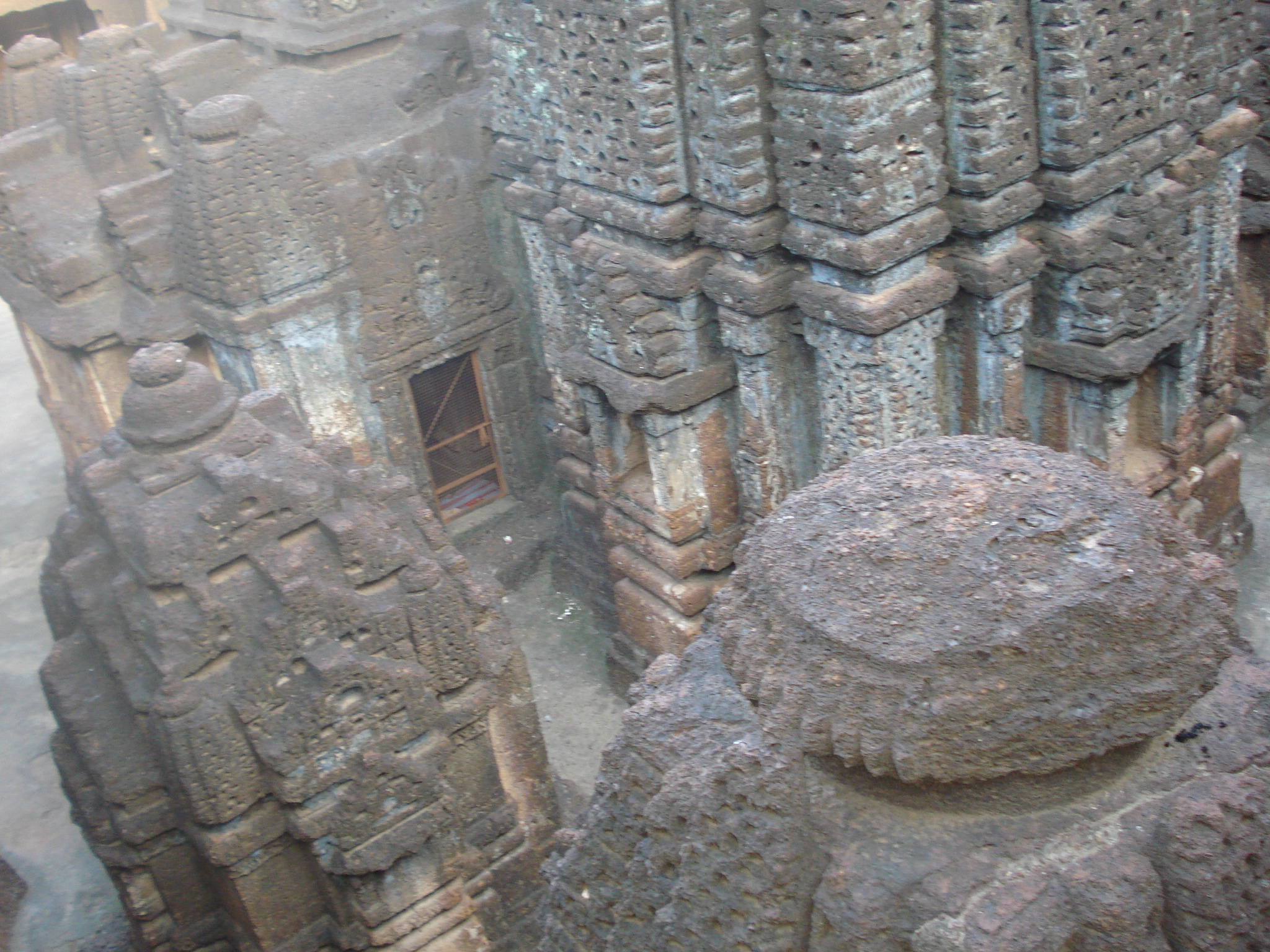
Dharmarajeshwara temple

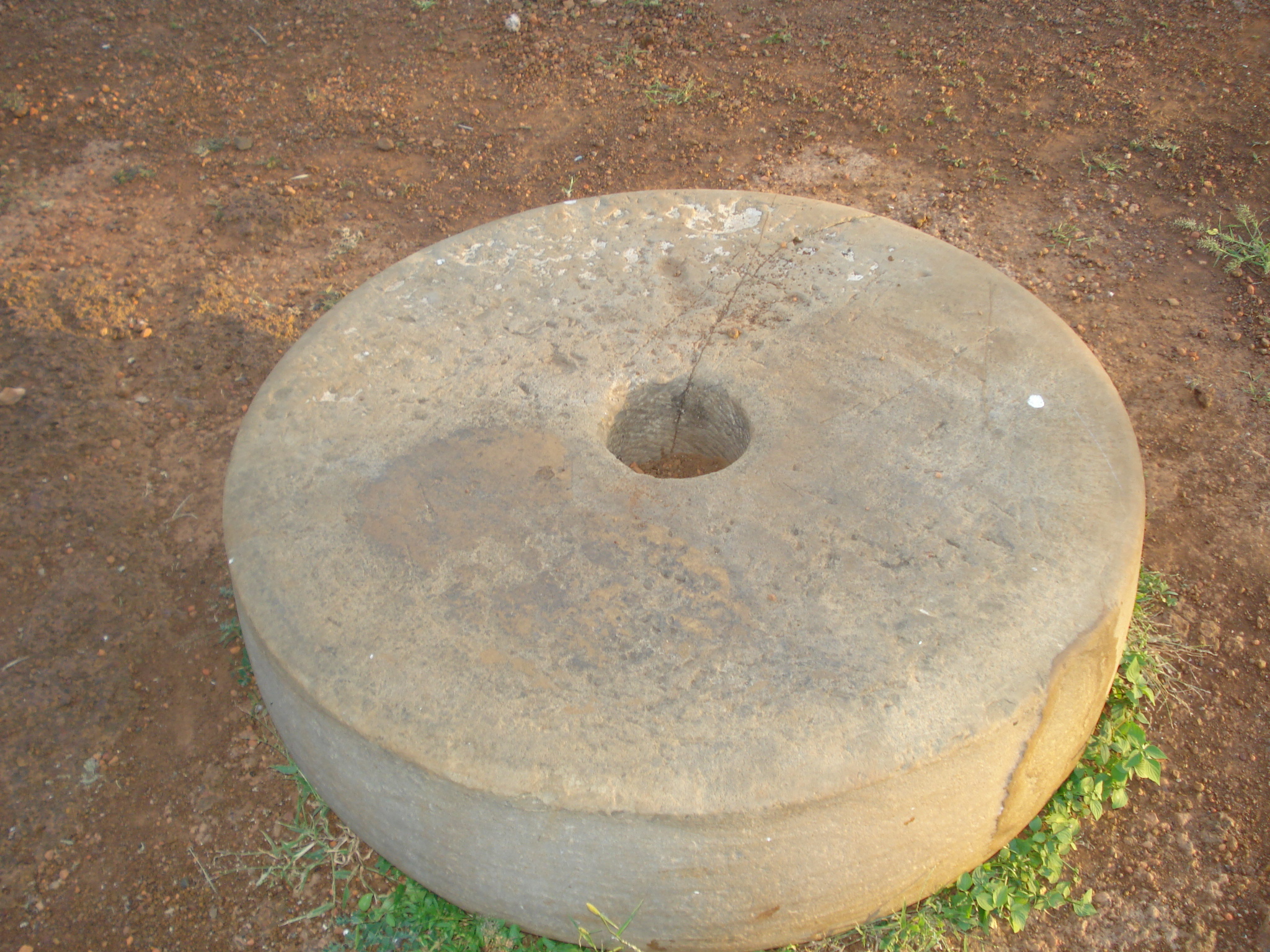
A Stone Wheel for Mortar making at Dharmrajeshwar
