= Navali, Lingasugur =

Navali Nowli
- Village
- Location within Karnataka Location within India
- Coordinates: 16°9′42.35″N 76°18′23.19″E
- Country: India
- State: Karnataka
- District: Raichur district
- Taluk: Lingasugur

Population (2001)
  - Total: 730

Languages
  - Official: Kannada
- Time zone: UTC+5:30 (IST)
- Vehicle registration: KA 36

Navali also spelled as Nowli is a village in the Lingasugur taluk of Raichur district in the Indian state of Karnataka. Navali is located west to Lingasugur town. Great Vachanakara Sri Shankara Dasimayya lived in Navali.

== Demographics ==
As of 2001 India census, Navali had a population of 730 with 372 males and 358 females and 144 Households.

== See also ==
- Pura, Kushtagi
- Tavaragera
- Kanakagiri
- Lingasugur
- Sindhanur
- Raichur
