= Navali, Mandsaur =

Village in Mandsaur district, Madhya Pradesh, India

Coordinates: 24.625°N 75.726°E

Navali is a village in Bhanpura tahsil in Mandsaur district, Madhya Pradesh. Navali derives name from Latin word Navalis meaning "pertaining to ship".

Navali was once used by King Yashwant Rao Holkar to extract Iron ore to make canons for fighting against British rule. The iron ore was taken to Hinglajgarh fort and was utilized to make canons
