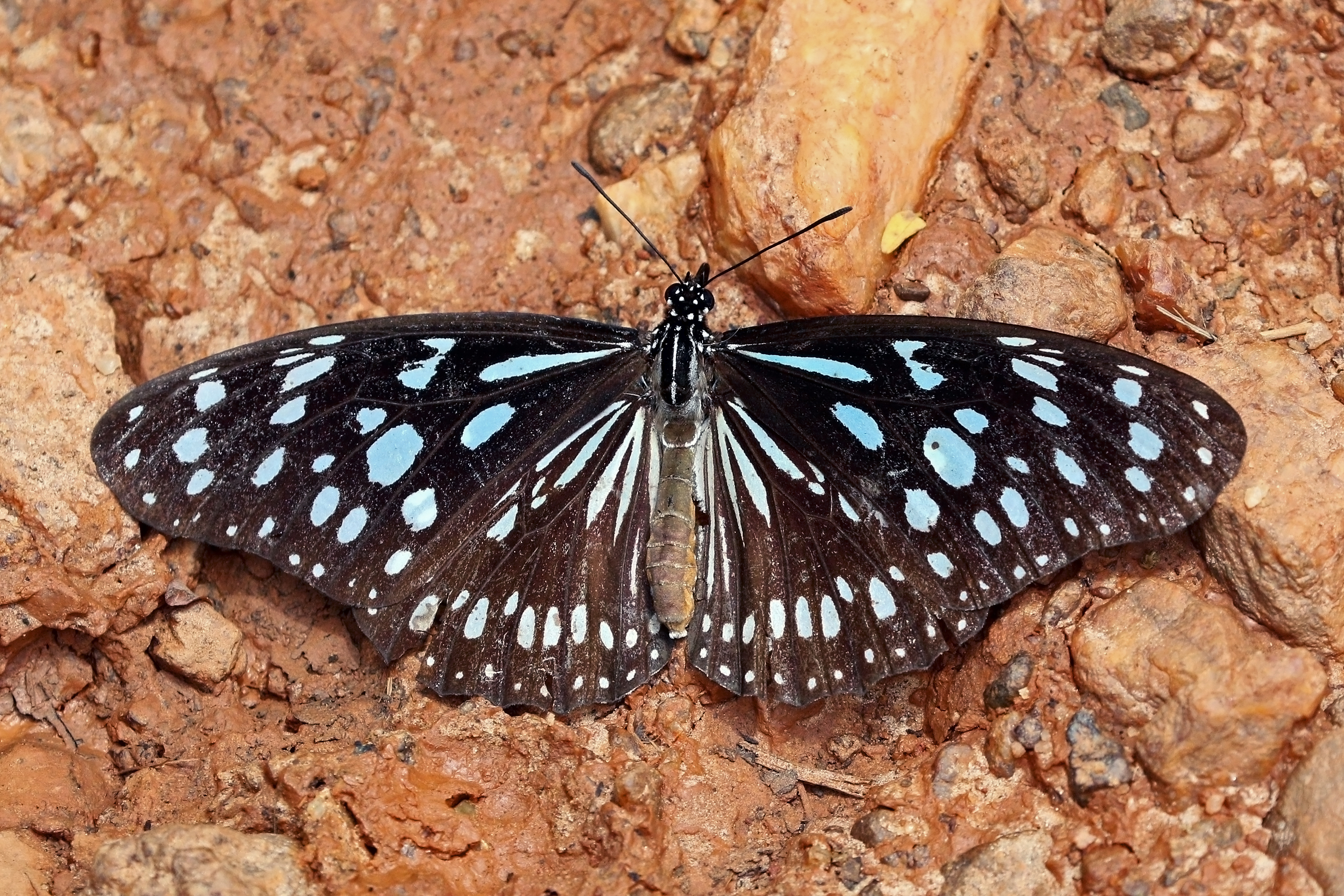
- male, Bobiri Forest, Ghana

Conservation status
- Least Concern (IUCN 3.1)

Scientific classification
- Kingdom: Animalia
- Phylum: Arthropoda
- Clade: Pancrustacea
- Class: Insecta
- Order: Lepidoptera
- Family: Nymphalidae
- Genus: Tirumala
- Species: T. petiverana

Binomial name
- Tirumala petiverana (Doubleday, [1847])

Synonyms
- Danais limniace var. petiverana Doubleday, [1847]; Tirumala leonora (Butler, 1866); Tirumala phrynichus Fruhstorfer, 1910; Tirumala septentrionides Stoneham, 1958

= Tirumala petiverana =

Species of butterfly

Tirumala petiverana, the blue monarch, is a butterfly of the family Nymphalidae. It is widespread in tropical and subtropical Sub-Saharan Africa. Their habitat consists of Afromontane, lowland and riverine forests as well as moist savanna.

The wingspan is 60–75 mm. There is one generation per year. Adults are on wing from February to May (with peaks in April) in Zimbabwe.

The larvae feed on Pergularia extensa, Pergularia daemia, Daemia, Hoya, and Marsdenia rubicunda.

Torben Larsen developed a species numbering system for his 2005 publication Butterflies of West Africa. This species is #648. The 'Larsen' numbers have since been used with permission in A Sharp Eye on Butterflies of Ghana.

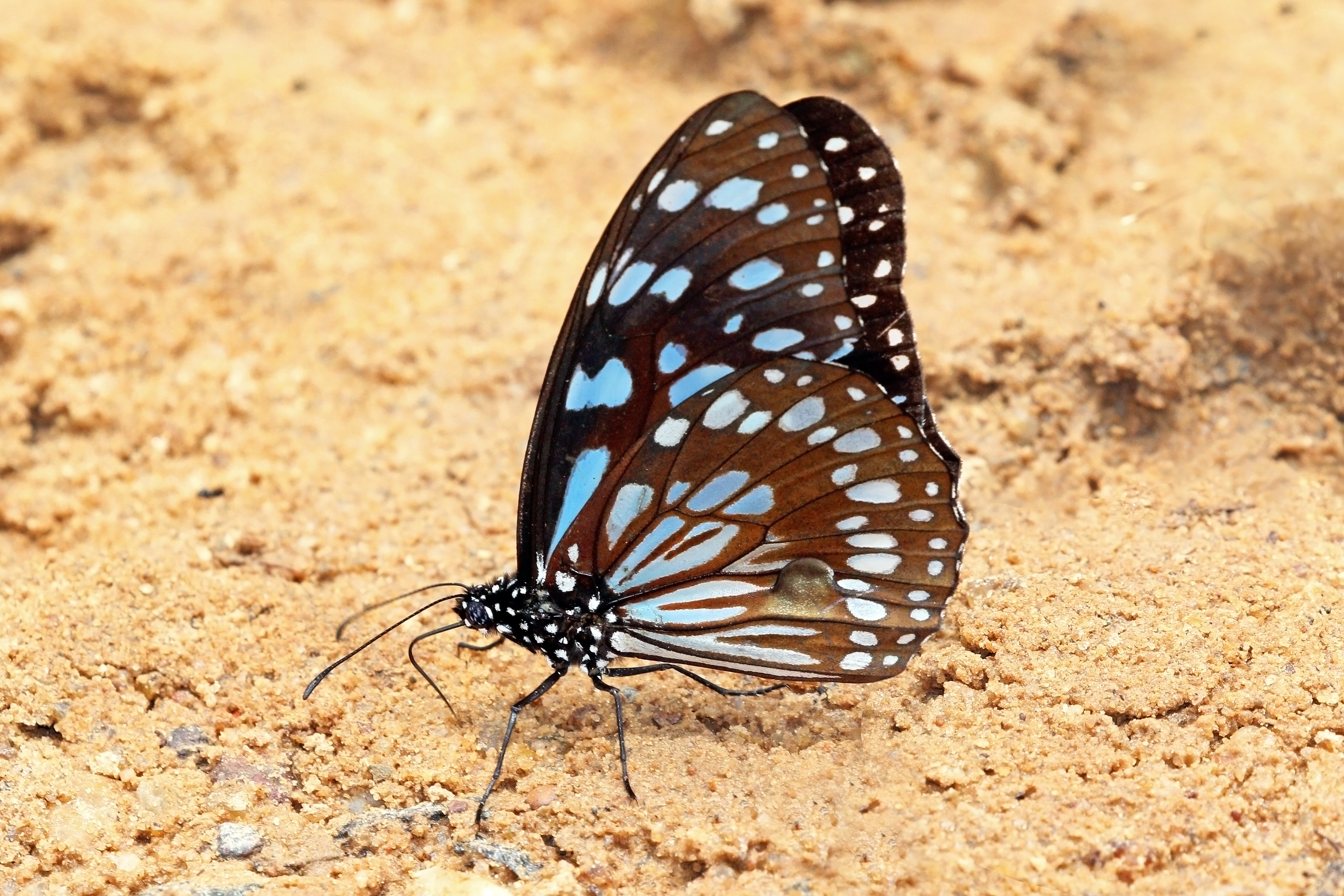
male mud-puddling

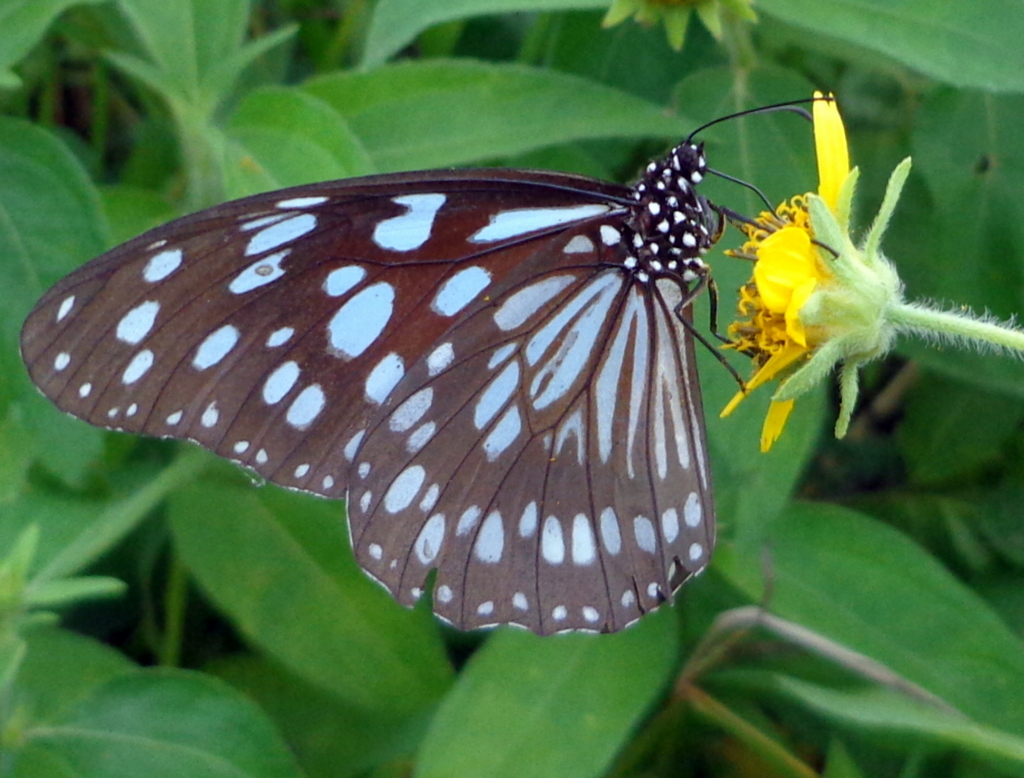
female feeding on sunflower nectar
