= Ramgarh Vishdhari Wildlife Sanctuary =

Tiger reserve in Rajasthan, India

- IUCN category IV (habitat/species management area)
- Location within Rajasthan Location within India
- Interactive map of Ramgarh Vishdhari Wildlife Sanctuary
- Location: Bundi district, Bhilwara district and Kota district, Rajasthan, India
- Coordinates: 25°34′N 75°54′E
- Area: 1,501.89 km^{2} (579.88 sq mi)
- Established: 1982 (as Wildlife Sanctuary); 2022 (as Tiger Reserve)

Ramgarh Vishdhari Wildlife Sanctuary is a tiger reserve in Rajasthan, India. It was declared as a tiger reserve in the 2022.

== Geography ==
Ramgarh Vishdhari Wildlife Sanctuary is located in Bundi, Bhilwara and Kota districts of Rajasthan. It was declared as a wildlife sanctuary in 1982 and a tiger reserve in 2022. It encompasses the area of Ramgarh Sanctuary, a section of the National Gharial Sanctuary, and the territorial forest areas of the Bundi and Bhilwara divisions. The total area of the reserve is 1,501.89 km^{2} (579.88 sq mi), including a core of 481.90 km^{2} (186.06 sq mi) and buffer of 1,019.98 km^{2} (393.82 sq mi). It connects Ranthambore National Park with Mukundara Hills National Park. The Mej River, a tributary of the Chambal River, flows through the tiger reserve.

== Wildlife ==
Ramgarh Vishdhari Wildlife Sanctuary hosts the sambar deer, chital, wild boar, Indian wolf, leopard, striped hyena, sloth bear, golden jackal, chinkara, and nilgai.

Following its designation as a tiger reserve, a few tigers were translocated; a tiger from Sariska Tiger Reserve that had wandered into Haryana was relocated to Ramgarh Vishdhari Tiger Reserve. By December 2024, the reserve supported four adult tigers and three cubs.
