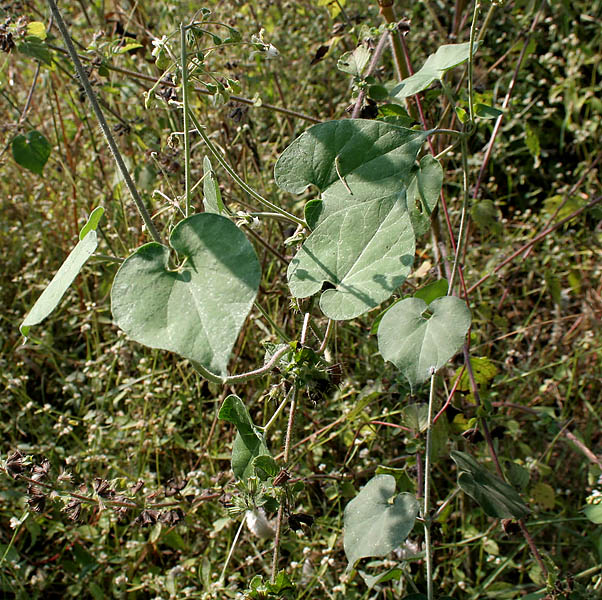
- Pergularia daemia in Hyderabad, India

Scientific classification
- Kingdom: Plantae
- Clade: Tracheophytes
- Clade: Angiosperms
- Clade: Eudicots
- Clade: Asterids
- Order: Gentianales
- Family: Apocynaceae
- Subfamily: Asclepiadoideae
- Tribe: Asclepiadeae
- Genus: Pergularia; L.

= Pergularia =

Genus of flowering plants

Pergularia is a genus of the botanical family Apocynaceae. Pergularia daemia is a perennial twinning herb that grows along the roadsides of India and tropical and subtropical regions in South Asia, Africa, and Australia.

Pharmacological activities include antiinflammatory, hepatoprotective, anticancer, antidiabetic, antioxidant, antibacterial, antifungal, analgesic, anti-infertility and central nervous system depressant activity.

Species

1. Pergularia adenophylla Schltr. & K. Schum. - Cameroon
2. Pergularia brunoniana (Wight & Arn.) D.Dietr. - India
3. Pergularia calesiana (Wight) Buch.-Ham. ex Hook.f. - Himalayas
4. Pergularia clausa (R.Br.) Spreng. - Jamaica
5. Pergularia daemia (Forssk.) Chiov. - Africa, S Asia
6. Pergularia exilis (Colebr.) Spreng. - Bangladesh
7. Pergularia flavescens (A.Cunn.) Hook.f. ex D.Dietr.
8. Pergularia hamiltonii (Wight) D.Dietr. - Uttar Pradesh
9. Pergularia rostrata (R.Br.) Spreng. - Queensland
10. Pergularia roylei (Wight) D.Dietr. - Himachal Pradesh
11. Pergularia suaveolens (R.Br.) Spreng. - Australia
12. Pergularia tinctoria (R.Br.) Spreng. - Sumatra
13. Pergularia tomentosa L. - Middle East from Egypt to Pakistan
14. Pergularia viridiflora (R.Br.) Spreng. - Australia

formerly included

Moved to other genera – Cionura, Marsdenia, Strophanthus, Telosma, Vincetoxicum (syn. Tylophora), Vallaris

1. P. accedens, syn of Telosma accedens
2. P. africana, syn of Telosma africana
3. P. angustiloba, syn of Telosma angustiloba
4. P. celebica, syn of Telosma celebica
5. P. divaricata, syn of Strophanthus divaricatus
6. P. erecta, syn of Cionura erecta
7. P. filipes, syn of Telosma procumbens
8. P. glabra, syn of Vallaris glabra
9. P. minor, syn of Telosma cordata
10. P. pallida, syn of Telosma pallida
11. P. parviflora, syn of Marsdenia parviflora
12. P. procumbens, syn of Telosma procumbens
13. P. puberula, syn of Telosma puberula
14. P. sanguinolenta, syn of Cryptolepis sanguinolenta
15. P. sinensis, syn of Cryptolepis sinensis
16. P. tenacissima, syn of Marsdenia tenacissima
17. P. velutina, syn of Tylophora velutina
