= Chambal River =

River in India

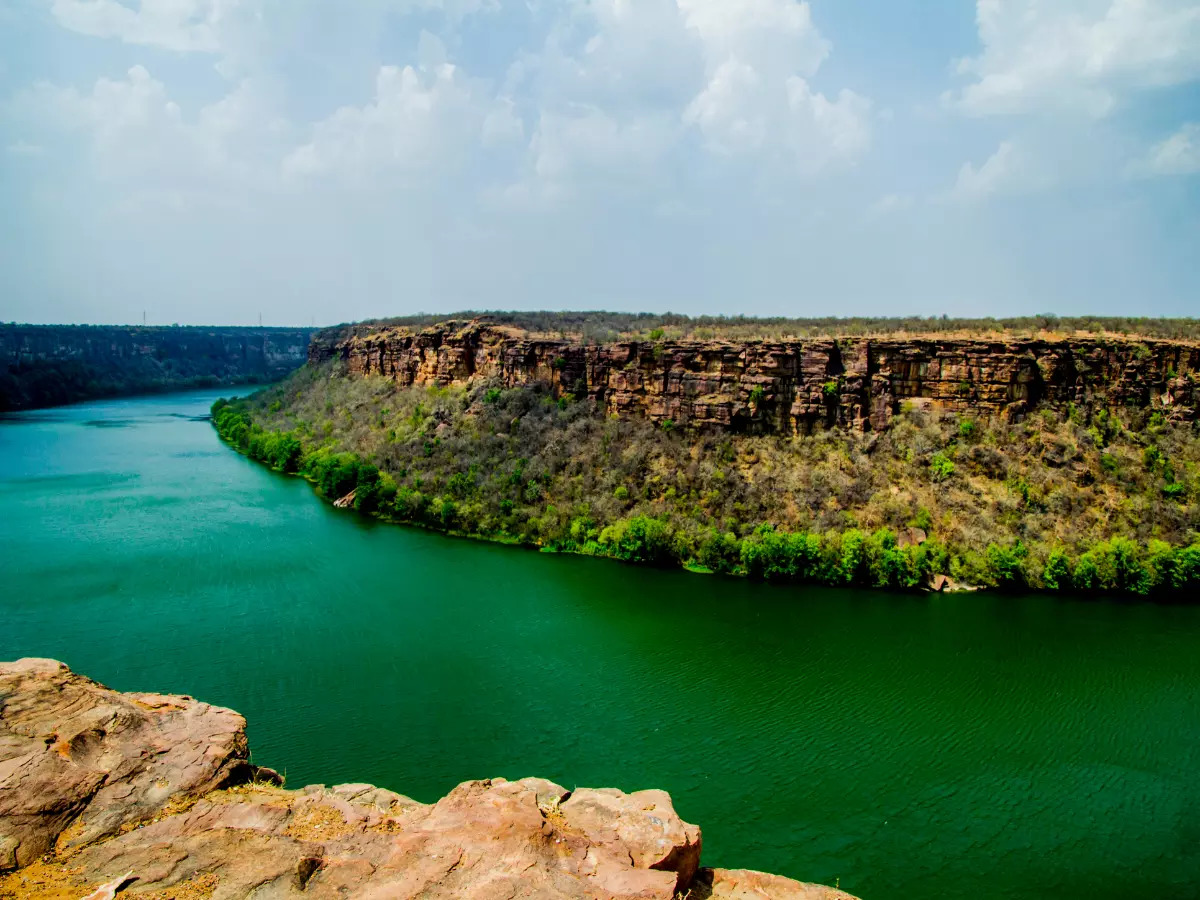
- Chambal River Gorge as seen from Kota, Rajasthan

Location
- Country: India
- State: Madhya Pradesh, Rajasthan, Uttar Pradesh
- City: Kota, Nagda, Morena, Bhind, Etawah, Dholpur, Rawatbhata

Physical characteristics
- Source: Bhadakla Falls in rewa enterprise
  - location: Vindhyachal Ranges, Mhow, Madhya Pradesh, India
  - coordinates: 22°27′N 75°31′E
  - elevation: 870.25 m (2,855.2 ft)
- Mouth: Yamuna River
  - location: Near Bhareh, Etawah district, Uttar Pradesh India
  - coordinates: 26°29′20″N 79°15′10″E
  - elevation: 123 m (404 ft)
- Length: 1,024 km (636 mi)
- Basin size: 143,219 km^{2} (55,297 sq mi)
- Discharge
  - average: 456 m^{3}/s (16,100 cu ft/s)
  - minimum: 58.53 m^{3}/s (2,067 cu ft/s)
  - maximum: 2,074.68 m^{3}/s (73,267 cu ft/s)

Basin features
- Tributaries
  - left: Banas, Mej
  - right: Parbati, Kali Sindh, Shipra, Kuno River, Shivna

The Chambal River is a tributary of the Yamuna River in Central and Northern India, and thus forms part of the drainage system of the Ganges. The river flows north-northeast through Madhya Pradesh, briefly flowing through Rajasthan, then forming the boundary between Rajasthan and Madhya Pradesh before turning southeast to join the Yamuna in Uttar Pradesh state.

The Chambal finds mention in ancient Hindu scriptures. The Hindu epic Mahabharata refers to the Chambal River as Charmanyavati: originating from the blood of thousands of cows sacrificed by the King Rantideva.

== History ==
=== Vedic era ===
During the Vedic era, the ancient name of Chambal river was Charmanvati, meaning the river on whose banks leather is dried. In due course of time, this river became famous as the river of ‘charman’ (skin) and was named as Charmanvati. The epic Sanskrit narrative the Mahabharata, refers to the Chambal river as the Charmanyavati : originating from the blood of thousands of animals sacrificed by the King Rantideva.

"So large was the number of animals sacrificed in the Agnihotra of that king that the secretions flowing from his kitchen from the heaps of skins deposited there caused a veritable river which from this circumstance, came to be called the Charmanwati."

Chambal area was part of Shakuni's kingdom and the dice-game played thereabouts. After the attempted disrobing of Draupadi (the daughter of Drupada) she cursed anyone who would drink the water of the Charmanwati river. Thus it is believed that due to the curse by Draupadi, have helped the Chambal to survive unpolluted by man, and its many animal inhabitants to thrive relatively untouched. The Chambal remains one of India's most pristine rivers.

== Chambal ==
=== Basin ===
The Chambal is a rainfed catchment with a total drained area up to its confluence with the Yamuna of 144,591 square kilometres (55,827 sq mi). The drainage area resembles a rectangle up to the junction of the Parvathi and Banas Rivers with the Chambal flowing along its major axis. The Chambal Basin lies between latitudes 22° 27' N and 27° 20' N and longitudes 73° 20' E and 79° 15' E. On its south, east and west, the basin is bounded by the Vindhyan mountain ranges and on the north-west by the Aravallis. Below the confluence of the Parvathi and Banas, the catchment becomes narrower and elongated. In this reach, it is bounded by the Aravalli mountain ranges on the North and the Vindhyan hill range on the south.

The Vindhyan scarps, in the northwest, flank the left bank of the Chambal, and subsequently, is mainly drained by it. The Chambal rising within about 16 km of the Narmada river, appears as a consequent on the Mesozoic surface, superimposed on the scarps, and cuts straight through them, with subsequent tributaries on the softer shales. The River Chambal and its tributaries Kali Sindh and Parbati have formed a triangular alluvial basin, about 200–270 m (660–890 ft) above the narrow trough of the lower Chambal in Kota. It is a typical anterior-drainage pattern river, being much older than the rivers Yamuna and Ganges, into which it eventually flows.

=== Course ===
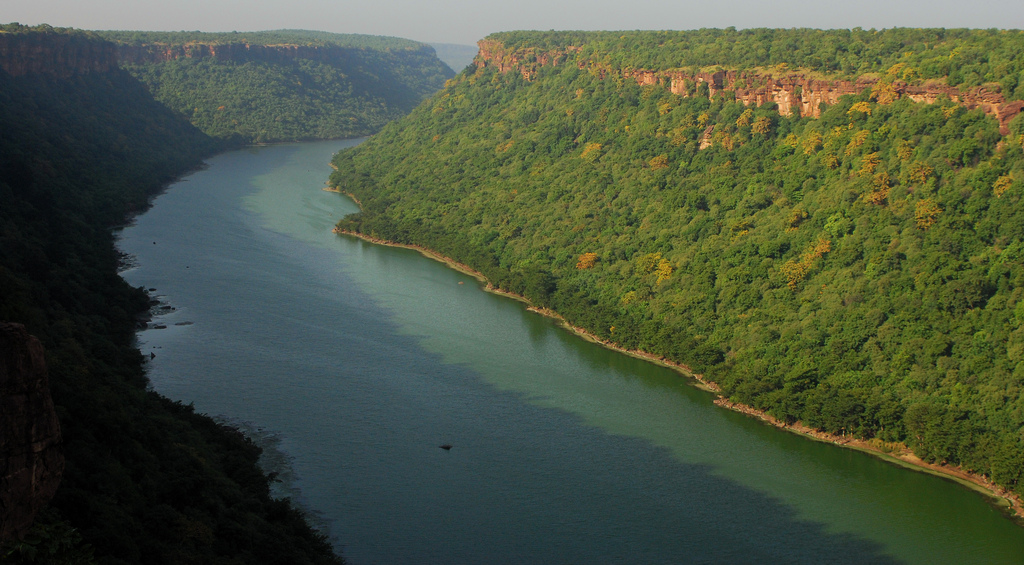
Chambal River near Kota, Rajasthan

The 1,024 km (636 mi) long Chambal River originates from the Bhadakla Falls in Janapav Hills on the northern slopes of the Vindhyan escarpment near Mandav, 67.5 km (41.9 mi) south-west of Mhow in Indore District, Madhya Pradesh at an elevation of about 843 m (2,766 ft). The river flows first in a northerly direction through Madhya Pradesh for about 376 km (234 mi) and then in a generally north-easterly direction for 249 km (155 mi) through Rajasthan. Then it flows for another 216 km (134 mi) between Madhya Pradesh and Rajasthan and a further 150 km (93 mi) between Madhya Pradesh and Uttar Pradesh. It flows for about 33 km (21 mi) before joining the Yamuna River in Jalaun District at an elevation of 123 m (404 ft), to form a part of the greater Gangetic drainage system. From its source to its junction with the Yamuna, the Chambal has a fall of about 717.6 m (2,354 ft). Of this, around 305 m (1,001 ft) is within the first 26 km (16 mi) reach from its source. It falls for another 195 m (640 ft) in the next 312 km (194 mi), where it enters the gorge past the Chaurasigarh Fort. During the next 157 km (98 mi) of its run from the Chaurasigarh Fort to Kota city, the bed falls by another 91 m (299 ft). For the rest of its 529 km (329 mi) run, the river passes through the flat terrain of the Malwa Plateau and later the Gangetic Plain with an average gradient of 0.21 m/km.

=== Tributaries ===
The tributaries of the Chambal include Shipra, Choti Kalisindh, Shivna, Retam, Ansar, Kalisindh, Banas, Parbati, Seep, Kuwari, Kuno, Alnia, Mej, Chakan, Parwati, Chamla, Gambhir, Lakhunder, Khan, Bangeri, Kedel and Teelar.

According to Crawford (1969), the Chambal river valley is part of the Vindhyan system which consists of massive sandstone, slate and limestone, of perhaps pre-Cambrian age, resting on the surface of older rocks. Hillocks and plateaus represent the major landforms of the Chambal valley. The Chambal basin is characterised by an undulating floodplain, gullies and ravines. The Hadauti plateau in Rajasthan occurs in the upper catchment of the Chambal River to the southeast of the Mewar Plains. It occurs with the Malwa plateau in the east. Physiographically, it can be divided into Vindhyan scarp land and Deccan Lava (Malwa) plateau. According to Heron (1953), the eastern pediplain, occurring between the Vindhyan plateau and the Aravalli hill range, contains a thin veneer of Quaternary sediments, reworked soil and river channel fills. At least two erosional surfaces can be recognised within the pediplain are the Tertiary age. The Vindhyan upland, the adjoining Chambal valley and the Indo-Gangetic alluvial tract (older alluvium) are of Pleistocene to Sub-recent age. Badland topography is a characteristic feature of the Chambal valley, whereas kankar has extensively developed in the older alluvium.

=== Dams ===
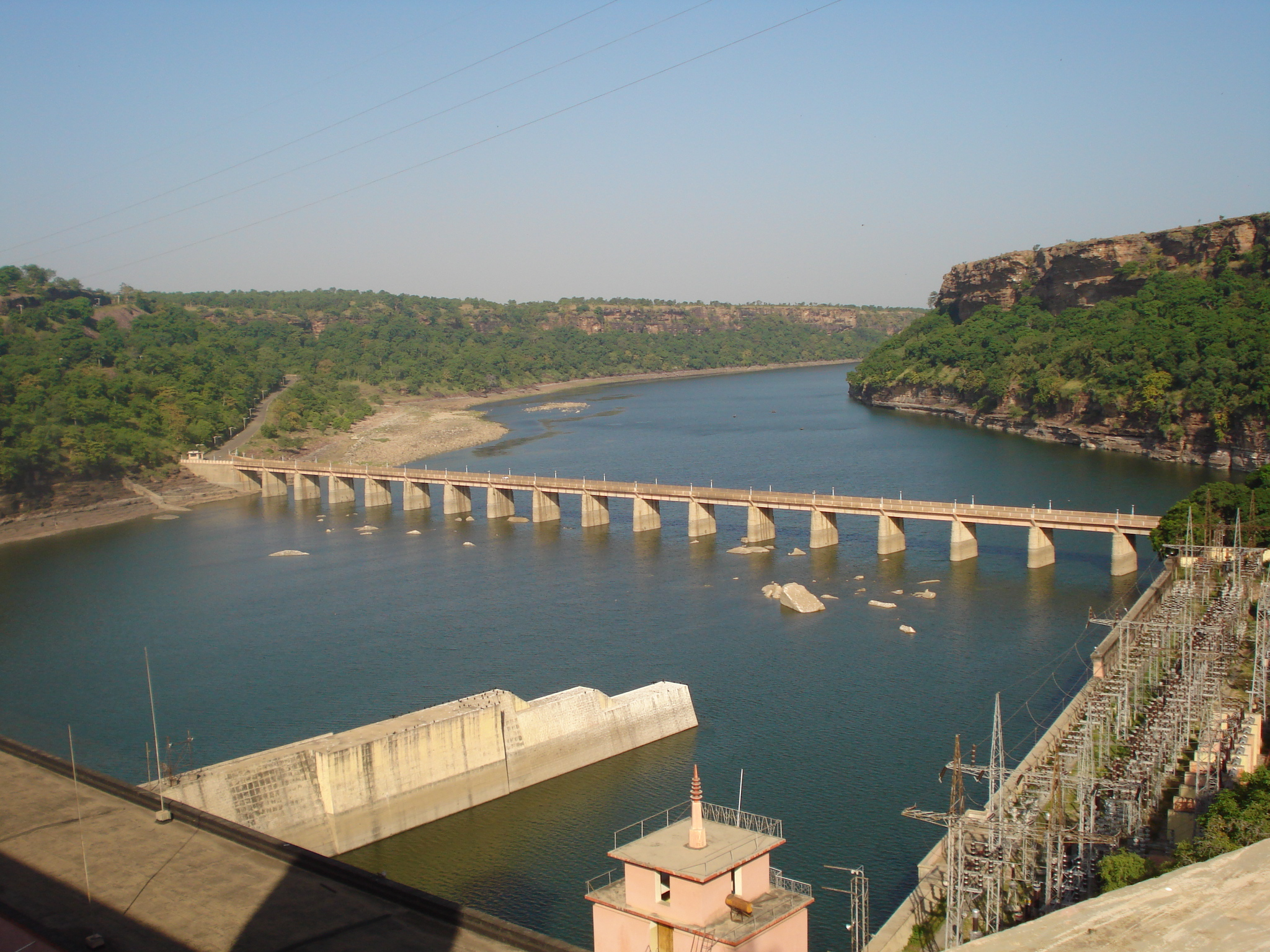
Gandhisagar Dam on Chambal river.

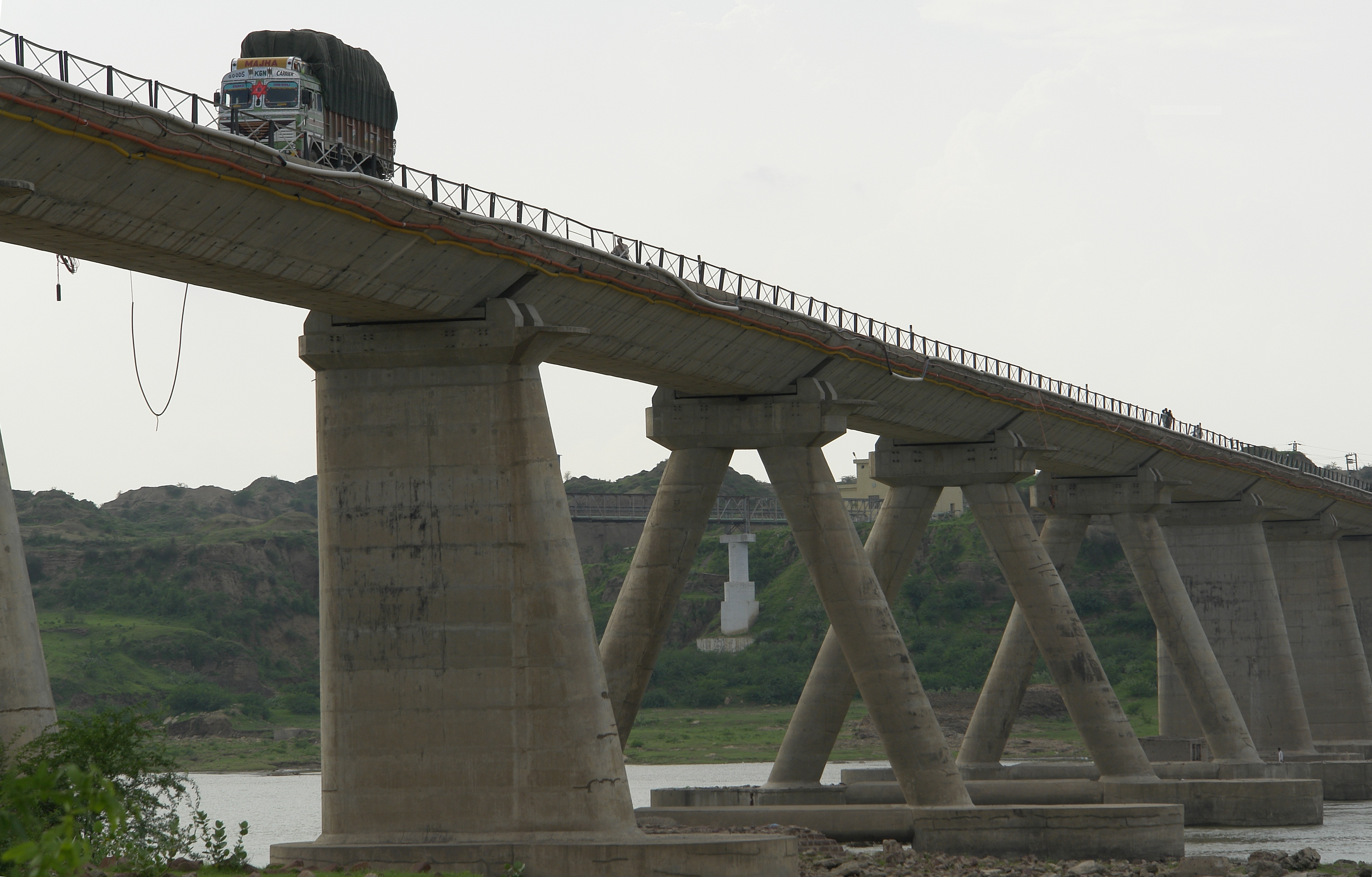
Bridge with National Highway 3 on Chambal river

In a stretch of 96 km (60 mi), from km 344 to km 440 from its source, the Chambal flows through a deep gorge, while lower down, there are wide plains. The Gandhi Sagar Dam is located near the center of this reach. As there is a deep gorge immediately upstream of the dam, the reservoir has a large storage capacity despite its comparatively low height. For the next 48 km (30 mi), the river flows through the Kundal Plateau, and the Rana Pratap Sagar Dam is constructed at the lower end of this. The topography permits fairly good storage upstream of the dam. Further down, the Jawahar Sagar Dam is located in the middle of the Kota gorge. The Kota Barrage is located near Kota town, where the river emerges from the gorge section into the plateau. The total area draining the Kota Barrage is 27,319 km^{2} (10,548 sq mi). The Gandhi Sagar dam is the first of the four dams built on the Chambal River, located on the Rajasthan-Madhya Pradesh border. It is a 64 metre high masonry gravity dam, with a live storage capacity of 6,920 million cubic metres and a catchment area of 22,584 km^{2} (8,720 sq mi), of which only 1,537 km^{2} (593 sq mi) is in Rajasthan. The dam was completed in the year 1960. The hydro-power station comprises five generating units of 23 MW capacity each. The water released after power generation is used for irrigation through Kota Barrage.

- Rana Pratap Sagar dam is a dam located 52 km downstream of Gandhi Sagar dam on across the Chambal River near Rawatbhata in Chittorgarh district in Rajasthan. It was completed in the year 1970 and it is the second in the series of Chambal Valley Projects. It is 54 meters high. The power house is located on the left side of the spillway and consists of 4 units of 43 MW each, with firm power generation of 90 MW at 60% load factor. The total catchment area of this dam is 24,864 km^{2}, of which only 956 km^{2} are in Rajasthan. The free catchment area below Gandhi Sagar dam is 2,280 km^{2}. The live storage capacity is 1,566 MCM.
- Jawahar Sagar Dam is the third dam in the series of Chambal Valley Projects, located 29 km upstream of Kota city and 26 km downstream of Rana Pratap Sagar dam. It is a concrete gravity dam, 45 meter high and 393 m long, generating 60 MW of power with an installed capacity of 3 units of 33 MW. The work was completed in 1972. The total catchment area of the dam is 27,195 km^{2}, of which only 1,496 km^{2} are in Rajasthan. The free catchment area below Rana Pratap Sagar dam is 2,331 km^{2}.
- Kota Barrage is the fourth in the series of Chambal Valley Projects, located about 0.8 km upstream of Kota City in Rajasthan. Water released after power generation at Gandhi Sagar dam, Rana Pratap Sagar dam and Jawahar Sagar Dams, is diverted by Kota Barrage for irrigation in Rajasthan and in Madhya Pradesh through canals on the left and the right sides of the river. The work on this dam was completed in 1960. The total catchment area of Kota Barrage is 27,332 km^{2}, of which the free catchment area below Jawahar Sagar Dam is just 137 km^{2}. The live storage is 99 MCM. It is an earthfill dam with a concrete spillway. The right and left main canals have a headworks discharge capacity of 188 and 42 m^{3}/s, respectively. The total length of the main canals, branches and distribution system is about 2,342 km, serving an area of 2,290 km^{2} of CCA. The Barrage operates 18 gates to control flow of flood and canal water downstream, and serves as bridge between parts of Kota on both side of the river.

== Flora ==
The area lies within the semi-arid zone of north-western India at the border of Madhya Pradesh, Rajasthan and Uttar Pradesh. The vegetation consists of ravine, thorn forest, a sub-type of the Northern Tropical Forests (Sub-group 6B/C2 of the revised classification of Champion & Seth, 1968). This sub-type typically occurs in less arid areas with 600–700 mm rainfall. Limited examples of Saline/Alkaline Babul Savannah (5E/8_{b}), a type of Northern Tropical Dry Deciduous Forest, also occurs. Evergreen riparian vegetation is completely absent, with only sparse ground-cover along the severely eroded river banks and adjacent ravine lands.

The semiarid tract in Madhya Pradesh is represented by Chambal catchment extending up to Narmda and Betla Rivers. Over 1000 flowering plants have bean reported including Terminalia anogeissiana, T. pendula, Tectona grandis, Lannea coromandelica, Diospyros melanoxylon, Sterculia urens, Mitragyna parviflora, Butea monosperma, Phyllanthus emblica, Boswellia serrata, Bridelia squamosa and Hardwickia binata. Climbers of this area include species of Rhynchosia, Atylosia, Cocculus, Cissampelos, Ipomoea, Pergularia daemia, Pueraria tuberosa and Tinospora cordifolia. Thorny bushes or small trees commonly found in this area include Capparis deciduas, Capparis sepiaria, Balanites aegyptiaca, Acacia senegal, Vachellia nilotica, V. leucophloea, Neltuma juliflora, Butea monosperma, Maytenus emarginata, Tamarix sp., Salvadora persica, S. oleoides, Crotalaria medicaginea, C. burhia, Clerodendrum phlomidis, Calotropis procera, Xanthium strumarium and Leptadenia pyrotechnica associated with climbers such as Maerua oblongifolia, Pergularia daemia, Ceropegia bulbosa, herbs e.g., Argemone mexicana, Farsetia hamiltonii, Tephrosia purpurea, Cleome viscosa, Tribulus terrestris, Glinus lotoides, Sericostoma pauciflorum, Rivea sp., Ipomoea sp., Pedalium murex, Sesamum mulayanum, Lepidagathis sp, Boerhavia diffusa, Chrozophora sp., and grasses like Cyprus sp., Fimbristylis sp., Brachiaria sp., Cenchrus sp., Dichanthium sp., etc.

== See also ==
- Ganga Canal (Rajasthan)
- Ramjal Setu link project in Chambal river basin in eastern Rajasthan
- Indus Water Treaty impacts water supply in Rajasthan
- Ministry of Jal Shakti
- Irrigation in India
- Indian rivers interlinking project
- List of dams and reservoirs in India
- List of megaprojects in India
