= Paṭṭattu Vāsudeva Bhaṭṭatiri =

Indian Sanskrit poet

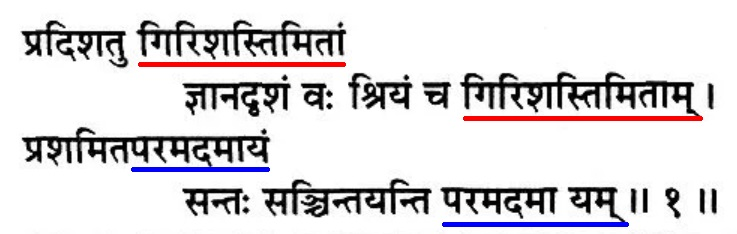
The first sloka in the first chapter of Yudhishthiravjaya by Pattathu Vasudeva Bhattathiri showing the yamaka-s.

Paṭṭattu Vāsudeva Bhaṭṭatiri (c. 9th century CE) was an Indian Sanskrit poet hailing from the present-day Thrissur district in Kerala. Bhaṭṭatiri's works are particularly noted for the use of the yamaka (a kind of rhyme) in the decoration of the verses, and his reputation as a poet largely stems from his skillful and extensive use of yamaka-s in his compositions. Yamaka is a form of literary ornamentation which involves the repetition of letters which has similar sound but mutually differs in meanings.

== Place and times ==
Bhaṭṭatiri was born into Paṭṭattu Mana, a Naṃpūtiri family whose ancestral home is located near Thiruvullakkavu Sree Dharma Sastha Temple in Cherpu Gramapanchayath in Thrissur district. The ancestral house of the Mana has survived to modern times possibly with many alterations and renovations. Bhaṭṭatiri has given some information about himself in some of his literary works. This suggests that he was a contemporary of King Kulaśekhara and was a student of a scholar by name Parameśvaran Naṃpūtiri and having the title of Bhārataguru. There was a tradition wherein all Kerala Kings, at the time of being crowned as king, assumed the title of "Kulasekhara". This means that there were many kings known by the name Kulasekhara. However, as per other indications in Bhaṭṭatiri's writings, it could be reasonably concluded that the Kulasekhara that Bhaṭṭatiri refers to was Kulasekha Alwar who is known to have reigned during the ninth century CE.

== Legend regarding Bhaṭṭatiri's emergence as a poet ==
Bhaṭṭatiri is particularly noted for his expertise in the use of yamakams in his compositions. Composing a yamaka kāvya is considered technically demanding, requiring significant poetic skill. According to tradition, Bhaṭṭatiri's emergence as a gifted poet from a modest, rural background was attributed by contemporaries to divine intervention. A well-known legend narrates the circumstances of this divine influence on his life.

The members of Paṭṭattu Mana, the family into which he was born, were traditional hereditary priests in the nearby Śāstā temple at Thiruvullakkavu. Bhaṭṭatiri also used to perform duties of a priest at the temple. One night, after the completion of his priestly duties, Bhaṭṭatiri found himself unable to return to his house due to continuous heavy rain and, as time passed, he felt very tired and hungry as he had not taken his nightly meal. As there were nobody in the precincts of the temple to seek help, he cried out to the deity of the temple to help him save from the grave situation. At that moment Bhaṭṭatiri heard a voice from the sanctum sanctorum instructing him to go the temple kitchen and eat the plantain fruit, kept there to be used as offering to the deity, to sate his hunger and to light the kitchen's fireplace using the firewood available there to warm himself. He obeyed the divine instructions and fell asleep in the kitchen floor itself. Next morning, when the temple servant came to clean up the temple, she was shocked to find the priest sleeping on the floor of the kitchen. To the surprised queries of the servant, Bhaṭṭatiri's reply was a verse in the vernacular language Malayalam couched in yamakam describing what he had done during the previous night. This verse is considered his earliest known composition and is traditionally viewed as the moment his poetic talent emerged. A further detail in the legend describes how the temple servant, believing that the plantain had granted Bhattathiri his poetic skill, consumed the remaining parts of the fruit, such as the rinds, and was said to have gained some poetic ability herself, though to a lesser degree.

== Works ==
The following are the main works attributed to Vāsudeva Bhaṭṭathiri.

1. Yudhiṣṭhiravijayaṃ: This is a Mahākāvya in eight cantos consisting about one thousand stanzas. The work deals with the story of Mahābhārata beginning with the hunting expedition of Pāṇḍu and ending with the coronation of Yudhiṣṭhira after the great war.
2. Tripuradahanaṃ: In two hundred stanzas, the poem describes the story of the destruction of the three cities of demons by Lord Śiva.
3. Śaurīkathā: This poem in six cantos depicts the early life of Lord Kṛsna as depicted in the Harivamśa. All these major incidents in the life of Kṛsṇa are narrated in the order of the Harivamśa.
4. Naḷodayaṃ: The poem deals with the well known story of Nala and Damayanti depicted in the Mahābhārata.

Some scholars have attributed the following works also to Vāsudeva Bhaṭṭathiri. But Not all scholars agree to this.

1. Vāsudevavijayaṃ
2. Gajendramokṣaṃ: The well known story of king Indradyumna and his release from curse forms the subject matter of the work.

== Reception and Influence of Yudhiṣṭhiravijaya ==
Bhaṭṭatiri's Yudhiṣṭhiravijaya is the first ever yamaka-kāvya to be composed in the history of Sanskrit literature. The use of yamaka-s has made the understanding of the meaning of the verses extremely difficult. This resulted in the composition of commentaries by accomplished scholars in the subsequent eras. A large number of commentaries on Yudhiṣṭhiravijaya have been identified from several parts of India. Most of them are still not critically edited and published. Yudhiṣṭhiravijaya has attracted commentaries by scholars from various parts of India, including regions as distant as Kashmir. This suggests a significant degree of recognition and circulation beyond its place of origin in Kerala. Among Sanskrit works composed in Kerala, few, aside from those attributed to Adi Shankaracharya, appear to have achieved comparable attention on a subcontinental scale.

Due to its linguistic complexity, Yudhiṣṭhiravijaya was used as a classroom text to illustrate the structure and derivation of Sanskrit words and also to teach the vocabulary of Sanskrit language.

The commentaries on Yudhiṣṭhiravijaya include the following:

- Padārtthacintanaṃ commentary by Raghava Variar (aka Srikanthadasan) of Kolathunadu (c. 15th century CE)
- Vijayadarśikā commentary by Acyuta (Place and times not known)
- Śiṣyahita commentary by Rājānakaratnakaṇṭa form Kashmir (1661 CE)
- Kāvyaprakāśikā commentary by Dharmarājādhvari from Cola Kingdom
- Ratnapradīpikā commentary by Śivadasa
- Bālavyulpattikāriṇī commentary by Cokkanāthan from Śrīrañgaṃ

== Additional reading ==
- For a critical study in English of Yudhișțhiravijaya: PhD Thesis titled "Vasudeva's Yudhisthiravijaya: A critical study" submitted to University of Kerala in 1980.
