= Pashupatinath Temple, Mandsaur =

Hindu temple in Madhya Pradesh, India

Pashupatinath Temple
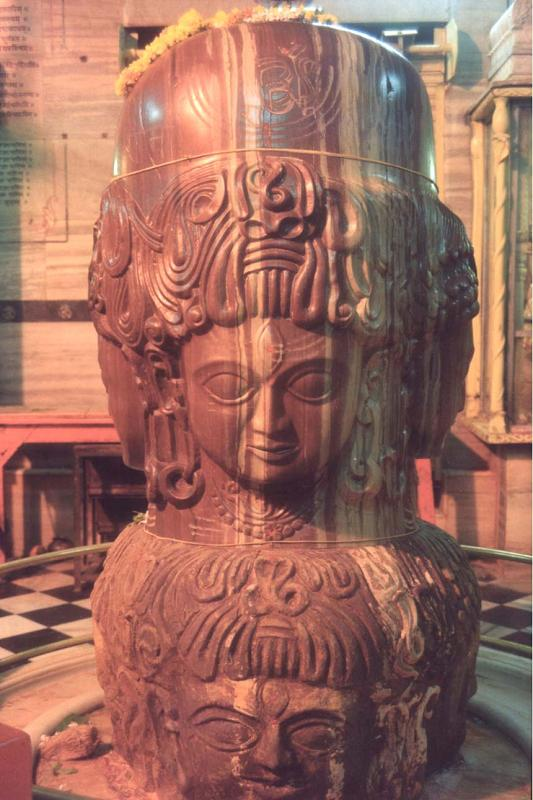
- Eight faced Mandsaur Shiva Linga

- Location within India Location within Madhya Pradesh

Religion
- Affiliation: Hinduism
- Deity: Shiva
- Festival: Maha Shivaratri

Location
- Location: Mandsaur
- State: Madhya Pradesh
- Country: India
- Interactive map of Pashupatinath Temple
- Coordinates: 24°03′17″N 75°04′22.5″E

Architecture
- Completed: 5th or 6th-century

Pashupatinath Temple at Mandsaur, also referred to as the Mandsaur Shiva temple, is a Hindu temple dedicated to Lord Shiva in Mandsaur, Madhya Pradesh, India. It belongs to Pashupatinath tradition which is one of 6 major tradition within Shaivism. It is located on Shivna River, and is known for its eight-faced Shiva Linga. The temple sculpture is dated to the 5th or 6th century based on inscriptions, with some referring to the site as Dashapura. It is near the Rajasthan border in the historic region of Malwa, about 200 kilometres (120 mi) from Indore, about 340 kilometres (210 mi) west of Udaigiri Caves and about 220 kilometres (140 mi) east of Shamalaji ancient sites, both a significant source of Gupta Empire era archaeological discoveries. The site has been important to dating and the architectural studies of some distant sites such as the Elephanta Caves.

The site's history is traceable to the 2nd-century CE when it was already a Hindu pilgrimage site. It is mentioned by the ancient Indian poet Kalidasa, who praises the women of Dashapura as "so practiced in their seductive movements". Ten inscriptions found in the area suggest the Mandsaur site was an important cultural and religious center in the first half of the 1st millennium CE. Nine of these inscriptions are Sanskrit poems, most dated between 404 and 487 CE, and all include invocations to Hindu gods such as Vasudeva and Shiva in various forms. They mention kings of Gupta Empire era, as well as temples of Dashapura. Together with dozens of temples discovered at a number of sites in western Madhya Pradesh, eastern Rajasthan and northern Gujarat region, the Mandsaur site with the Shiva Stele and the temple reflect what Stella Kramrisch called one of the "Western schools" of ancient and early medieval Indian art. James Harle concurs and includes the nearby Sondni and Kilchipura sites to the Western school along with regions farther west. According to Harle, the sculpture from the temple and other archaeological findings such as the Mandsaur inscriptions – one of which he calls "the longest and certainly the most beautiful of the Gupta inscriptions" – reflect the "flavor of life at its best in Gupta times".

The inscriptions, state Harle and other scholars, suggest that the sculpture and temples of Mandsaur were built with resources pooled by the common people, such as silk weavers of Dashapura (Mandsaur) who had settled there from Gujarat. However, these inscriptions mention a Surya (Sun) temple, a Vishnu temple and others. They do not mention the Pashupatinath temple. Excavations have yielded several brick temples of Shiva which have been dated to the 6th century, suggesting that Shiva was a prominent deity along with others in ancient Mandasor. Additionally, only the foundations of most early temples and monuments are presently identifiable, as the Buddhist, Hindu and Jain temples in Mandsaur were demolished and its stones and relief panels used to build a Muslim fort after the region was conquered in the late medieval era.

The eight face Shiva found in the reconstructed Pashupatinath temple is from the 1st millennium CE and a rare iconography. It is 4.5 metres (15 ft) tall and was discovered in the river bed of the Shivana. It has been reconsecrated into the temple. The upper part of the linga has four heads in a line, while the other four heads are carved below them in the second line. The faces have open eyes, with the third eye on their forehead visible. Each face has elaborate hair probably reflecting the culture of its time for men. Each wears jewelry such as earlobes, necklace and more. The eight faces represent the various aspects of Shiva in regional Shaivism theology: Bhava, Pashupati, Mahadeva, Isana, Rudra, Sharva, Ugra and Asani. It is sometimes referred to as Ashtamukha or Ashtamurti. According to Goyala, this Mandsaur linga is likely from the early 6th century.

== See also ==
- Telika Mandir
- Shivna River
