= Nilachala =

Region of religious significance in Odisha

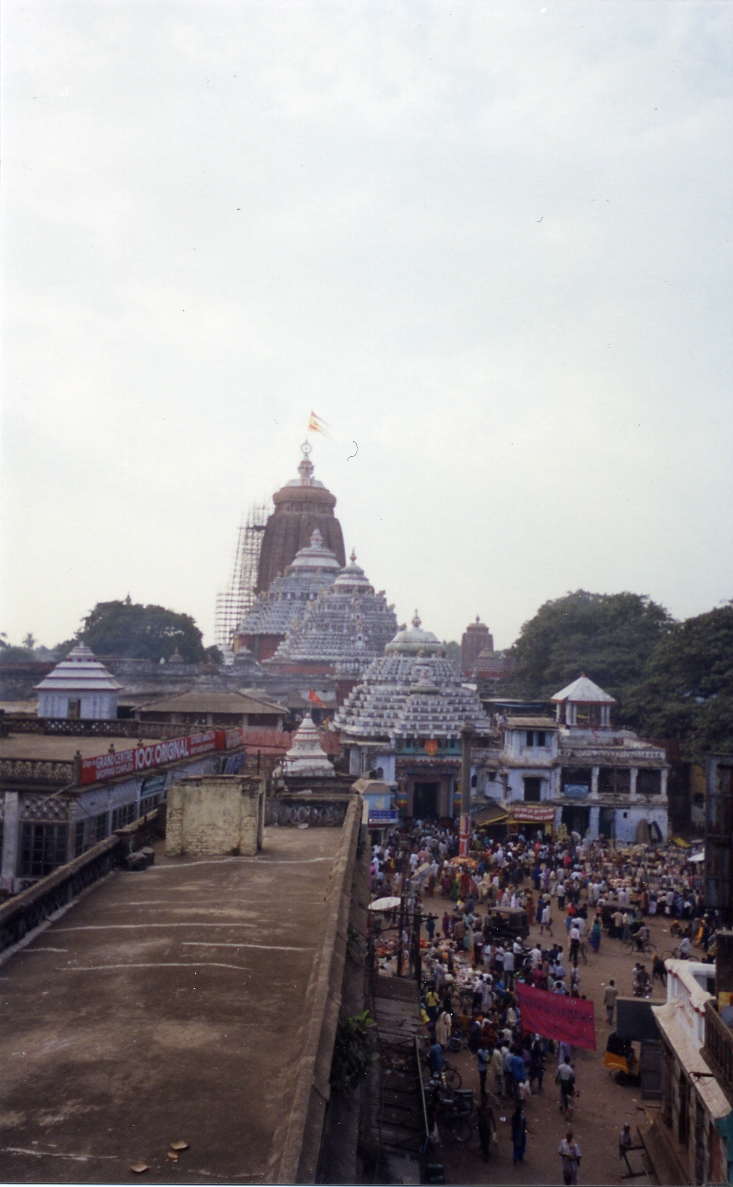
The Jagannath Temple at Puri

Nilachala, also rendered Niladri is a region corresponding to Puri, in the Indian state of Odisha.

== Description ==
According to the Skanda Purana, King Indradyumna of Avanti is said to have dreamt of the deity Nilamadhava. The king is regarded to have dispatched many priests and messengers in the search of this elusive deity, regarded as a form of Vishnu. Finally, Vidyapati, one of the priests of Indradyumna, located the image of Nilamadhava at Nilachala, at the sacred region of Purushottama Kshetra, and took the news back to the king. The image of the deity vanished before Indradyumna's arrival. After being propitiated, Vishnu is stated to have offered instructions for the construction of the Jagannath temple of Puri, also in Nilachala.

== Hypotheses ==
=== Hypothesis 1 ===
Indologist and researcher, Heinrich von Stietencron in "The Advent of Vishnuism in Orissa: An Outline of its History According to Archaeological and Epigraphical Sources from the Gupta Period up to 1135 AD." in A. Eschmann et al., The Cult of Jagannath and the Regional Tradition of Orissa, Delhi: Manohar, pp. 1–30, hypothesizes the actual existence of a mountain at Puri in the past and said:

No real mountain exists in the Puri town. Yet it is true that the Jagannath temple was actually built on a hill which receded sharply on its western side. Drifting sands and the sediments of continuous settlement have combined to raise the ground at the foot of the hill considerably so that the difference in level to the temple is no longer striking. It can be noticed, however, when approaching the ancient Siva temples which were situated to the west and to the north of the Hill.

=== Hypothesis 2 ===
Another hypothesis regarding the naming of Puri as 'Nilachala' has been advanced by the noted historian, Dr. Krushna Chandra Panigrahi, in his "History of Orissa", pp. 338–339. It has been argued that no mountain existed at the Jagannath shrine, and:

Then the Bhaumas came from Assam in the first part of the eighth century A.D., ruled over Orissa, obtained the shrine from the Savaras, got the temple built on the spot and gave it the name Nilachala, which was the name of the famous shrine of Kamakhya in their homeland of Assam.

== See also ==
- "Nilachaley Mahaprabhu" – biopic of Chaitanya Mahaprabhu

== Sources ==
- Shri Jaganath, official website
- Shri Jaganath Temple at Puri
- Das, Bikram: Domain Of Jagannath - A Historical Study, BR Publishing Corporation.
- Das, Suryanarayan: Jagannath Through the Ages, Sanbun Publishers, New Delhi. (2010)
- Eschmann, A., H. Kulke and G.C. Tripathi (Ed.): The Cult of Jagannath and the Regional Tradition of Orissa, 1978, Manohar, Delhi.
- Hunter, W.W. Orissa: The Vicissitudes of an Indian Province under Native and British Rule, Vol. I, Chapter-III, 1872.
- Kulke, Hermann in The Anthropology of Values, Berger Peter (ed.): Yayati Kesari revisited, Dorling Kindrsley Pvt. Ltd., (2010).
- Mahapatra, K.N.: Antiquity of Jagannath Puri as a place of pilgrimage, OHRJ, Vol.III, No.1, April, 1954, p. 17.
- Mishra, K.C.: The Cult of Jagannath, Calcutta, 1971.
- Mishra, Narayan and Durga Nandan: Annals and antiquities of the temple of Jagannath, Sarup & Sons, New Delhi, 2005.
- Panigrahi, K. C.: History of Orissa, Kitab Mahal, Cuttack, 2nd ed. (1981)
- Patnaik, H.S.: Jagannath, His Temple, Cult and Festivals, Aryan Books International, New Delhi, 1994, ISBN 81-7305-051-1.
- Patnaik, N.: Sacred Geography of Puri : Structure and Organisation and Cultural Role of a Pilgrim Centre, Year: 2006, ISBN 81-7835-477-2
- Starza-Majewski, Olgierd M. L: The Jagannatha temple at Puri and its Deities, Amsterdam, 1983.
- Starza-Majewski, Olgierd Maria Ludwik: The Jagannatha Temple At Puri: Its Architecture, Art And Cult, E.J. Brill (Leiden and New York). [1993]
- Stietencron, Heinrich von: "The Advent of Vishnuism in Orissa: An Outline of its History According to Archaeological and Epigraphical Sources from the Gupta Period up to 1135 AD." in Eschmann, A. et al., The Cult of Jagannath and the Regional Tradition of Orissa, Delhi: Manohar, pp. 1–30
