= Yudhishthiravijayam =

Malayalam epic poem about Yudhishthira

Yudhișțhiravijayaṃ
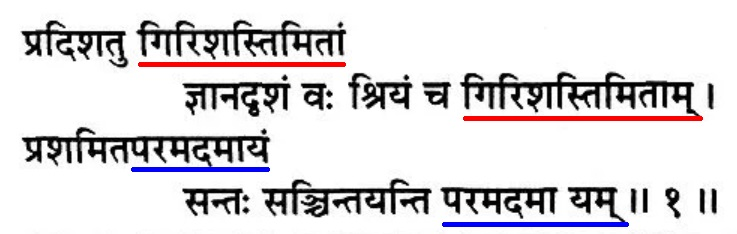
- The first sloka in the first chapter of Yudhishthiravjaya by Pattathu Vasudeva Bhattathiri showing the yamaka-s.
- Author: Paṭṭattu Vāsudeva Bhaṭṭatiri
- Language: Sanskrit
- Genre: Yamaka kāvya
- Publication date: 9th century CE
- Publication place: Modern-day Kerala, India

Yudhișțhiravijayaṃ is a Sanskrit poem authored by the ninth century CE poet Paṭṭattu Vāsudeva Bhaṭṭatiri hailing from the Indian state of Kerala. The poem is noted for the use of the yamaka (a kind of rhyme) in the decoration of the verses and because of this it is classified as a yamaka kāvya. Yamaka is a form of literary ornamentation which involves the repetition of letters which has similar sound but mutually differs in meanings. Bhaṭṭatiri was born into Paṭṭttu Mana, a Naṃpūtiri family whose ancestral home is located near Thiruvullakkavu Sree Dharma Sastha Temple in Cherpu Gramapanchayath in Thrissur district. This is a Mahākāvya in eight cantos consisting about one thousand stanzas. The work deals with the story of Mahābhārata beginning with the hunting expedition of Pāṇḍu and ending with the coronation of Yudhiṣṭhira after the great war.

== Commentaries ==
Bhaṭṭatiri's Yudhiṣṭhiravijaya is the first ever yamaka-kāvya to be composed in the history of Sanskrit literature. The use of yamaka-s has made the understanding of the meaning of the verses extremely difficult. This resulted in the composition of commentaries by accomplished scholars in the subsequent eras. A large number commentaries on Yudhiṣṭhiravijaya have been identified from several parts of India. Most of them are still not critically edited and published. The fact that Yudhiṣṭhiravijaya has commentaries by authors from different parts of India, even as far away a place as Kashmir, attests to the pan-India popularity and spread of this great Sanskrit work from Kerala. Not many works of Kerala authors, except perhaps the works of Ādi Śankarācarya, could obtain such pan-Indian recognition and acceptance.

The difficulty in understanding the verses in Yudhiṣṭhiravijaya turned to be a great blessing in disguise for teachers. For a very long time, in the traditional method of teaching of Sanskrit, Yudhiṣṭhiravijaya was used as "classroom text" to illustrate the structure and derivation of Sanskrit words and also to teach the rich vocabulary of Sanskrit language.

The commentaries on Yudhiṣṭhiravijaya include the following:

- Padārtthacintanaṃ commentary by Raghava Variar (aka Srikanthadasan) of Kolathunadu (c. 15th century CE)
- Vijayadarśikā commentary by Acyuta (Place and times not known)
- Śiṣyahita commentary by Rājānakaratnakaṇṭa form Kashmir (1661 CE)
- Kāvyaprakāśikā commentary by Dharmarājādhvari from Cola Kingdom
- Ratnapradīpikā commentary by Śivadasa
- Bālavyulpattikāriṇī commentary by Cokkanāthan from Śrīrañgaṃ

== See also ==
- Kaikulangara Rama Variar
