= Charmanvati =

River in Hindu mythology

Charmanvati (Sanskrit: चर्मण्वती, romanized: Carmaṇvatī) is a river mentioned in the epic Mahabharata. It is believed that the ancient name of Chambal river was Charmanvati, meaning the river on whose banks leather is dried. In due course of time, this river became famous as the river of ‘charman’ (skin) and was named as Charmanvati.

The Sanskrit epic Mahabharata, refers to the Chambal river as the Charmanyavati: originating in the blood of thousands of animals and cows sacrificed by the Aryan King Rantideva.

"So large was the number of animals sacrificed in the Agnihotra of that king that the secretions flowing from his kitchen from the heaps of skins deposited there caused a veritable river which from this circumstance, came to be called the Charmanvati."

== References in Mahabharata ==
Charmanvati was the southern boundary of Panchala Kingdom:- King Drupada ruled the southern Panchalas up to the bank of the Charmanvati river (1:140). King Rantideva is mentioned as performing animal sacrifices on the banks of Charmanvati (7:65, 12:29, 13:66). Kunti left her new-born baby (Karna) in a basket and made it float in the river. The basket floated from the river Aswa to the river Charmanvati, and from the Charmanvati it passed to the Yamuna, and so on to the Ganges (3:306) and reached the city called Champapuri the capital of Anga Kingdom.

Marching to the banks of the Charmanvati, the Kuru warrior Sahadeva met the son of king Jamvaka, who had, on account of old hostilities, been defeated before by Vasudeva Krishna. The son of Jamvaka gave battle to Sahadeva. And Sahadeva defeating the prince marched towards the south (2:30).

== See also ==
- Rigvedic rivers
- Sarasvati river
