= Sankriti =

Sage in Hinduism

Rajarshi Sankriti

Personal life
- Children: • Rantideva • Guruvirya/Gaurvitti
- Parent: Nara (of Chandravamsha dynasty) (father)
- Other names: • Sankritya • Sankrita

Religious life
- Religion: Hinduism

Sage Sankriti (Sanskrit: सङ्कृतिः) is the founding rishi of the Sankriti Gotra, one of the 10 lineages in Vedic society. The lineage of Sankriti's is given as "Angirasa, Sankritya, and Gaurivita," or "Shaktya, Sankritya, and Gaurivita." i.e. lineage of Angirasa/Shakti, Sankriti, and Gauriviti.

== Birth ==
According to the Puranas, Raja Bharata of the Paurava clan, being childless, adopted Bharadwaja from sage Brihaspati (a descendant of sage Angirasa).

Sankriti is said to be the son of Nara, grandson of Bhumanyu, great-grandson of Vitatha, great-great-grandson of Bharadwaja and belonged to Chandravansha dynasty.

== Descendants ==
He had two children, Raja Rantideva and Sage Gauriviti.

According to Mahabharata and Bhagavata Purana, Raja Rantideva was a renowned monarch of the Chandravansha Dynasty, celebrated for his profound selflessness and devotion. Sage Vashistha was a revered Saptarishi (ancient Vedic sage) who served as his spiritual preceptor and guide for him.

Sage Gauriviti, also known as Guruvirya, attained the Rishihood and led the origin of lineage description, "Angirasa, Sankritya, and Gaurivita."

However, the lineage of Sage Sankriti was thought to have joined the lineage of Sage Vashishta around the time of Sage Gauriviti, which, according to the English index of the "Gotrapravaranibandhakadamba happened through the niyoga process and according to Padmanabha's Gotrapravaranirnaya, happened because of Gauriviti being adopted by Shakti. This is considered to be the reason for the lineage description, "Shaktya, Sankritya, Gaurivita" found in pravara texts such as Ashvalayana's.

== Avadhutaka Upanishad ==
Sage Sankriti is recorded in the Brihad Avadhutaka Upanishad, where Lord Dattatreya explains the nature of an avadhuta to Sage Sankriti.
