= Neela Madhava =

Representation of Hindu deity Vishnu

Nilamadhava (Odia: ନୀଳମାଧବ, Sanskrit: नीलमाधव, romanized: Nīlamādhava) is a manifestation of Vishnu and Krishna featured in Hindu literature, with its origin in Odia tradition. According to traditional accounts, prior to his syncretism into Vaishnavism, this was the name of a deity made of sapphire that was venerated by the aboriginal Savara people, whose leader was known as Vishvavasu.

== Legend ==
According to the Puranas, Indradyumna, the king of Avanti, grew interested in venerating the deity Nilamadhava, made of sapphire. He is described to have sent the younger brother of his royal priest, or sometimes a minister, Vidyapati, to locate the site of the deity's image in the Nilagiri region. Regional folklore states that the priest was welcomed by Vishvavasu, the chieftain of the Savara people. During the duration of his stay in the chieftain's house, the latter's daughter, Lalita, fell in love with him. Upon the chieftain's request, Vidyapati married her. He noticed that the chieftain would leave the house every evening, and only return the following noon. At his urging, Lalita revealed to him that these were her father's visits to the shrine of Nilamadhava, whose location was held secret within the community. Vidyapati persuaded his wife to ask Vishvavasu to take him along to see the image of the deity. The chieftain agreed to take Vidyapati with him, but on the condition that he be blindfolded during the journey so that the shrine's location remained undisclosed. Lalita helped her husband devise a plan: Vidyapati brought a bag of mustard seeds with him, scattering them all along the path to the shrine present in a cave, bearing witness to the deep blue image of Nilamadhava. Returning to Avanti, he reported his discovery of the shrine to Indradyumna. After a few months, following the mustards seeds that had since germinated into plants, the king and his retinue travelled to the shrine, unable to locate the image. After praying to Vishnu for three days and nights, they heard the deity's voice thunder from the heavens, rebuking them for their scheme and informing them of his omnipresence. He announced that he would manifest as a wooden image (dāru) floating by the sea. He instructed them to construct a new temple upon a mountain that stood beside the seashore for his worship.

In the Skanda Purana, by the time Vidyapati returned to inform the king of the site of the shrine, a great storm had buried the image of Nilamadhava under the sand. Despite his best attempts, the king was unable to locate the image. Upon the counsel of the sage divinity Narada, Indradyumna constructed a new temple, and performed a thousand ashvamedha yajnas at the site. Receiving guidance in the form of a divine dream, a great tree floating in the sea was felled and used to create the three wooden images of the temple, those of Jagannatha, Balarama, and Subhadra. The king travelled to Brahmaloka to invite Brahma to inaugurate the temple. With the passage of time, a king named Gala claimed to have been the temple's real architect, but with the return of Indradyumna to earth, he withdrew this claim. After Brahma had inaugurated the temple, Indradyumna returned to Brahmaloka, entrusting the upkeep of the site to Gala.

A Nilamadhav Temple is present in the Kantilo town of Nayagarh, Odisha, dedicated to a deity named Nilamadhava, but of uncertain association.
