= Shivna River =

River in India

Shivna River Shivna River
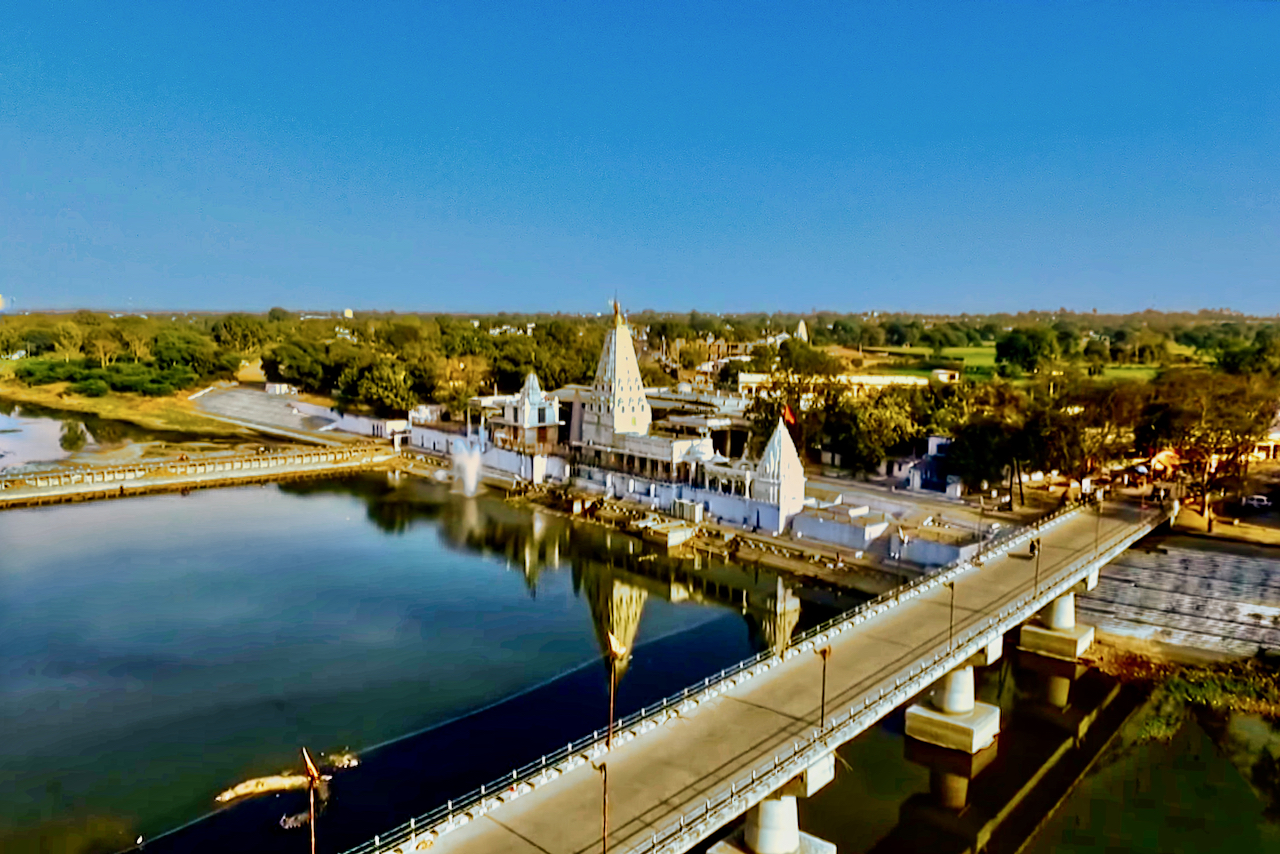
- Pashupati Nath Mandir Mandsaur on Bank of Shivna River

- Indian River Map

Location
- Country: India
- State: Madhya Pradesh
- Cities: Mandsaur

Physical characteristics
- Source
  - elevation: 358 m
- Mouth: Chambal River
  - coordinates: 24°15′N 75°22′E
- Length: 102 km (63 mi)

The Shivna is a river that flows through Rajasthan and Madhya Pradesh. It is a tributary of the Chambal River.

Shivna river is an important tributary of Chambal river. It is Originated in Rajasthan and flows along the border of Madhya Pradesh and enters Mandsour district near Achera.
