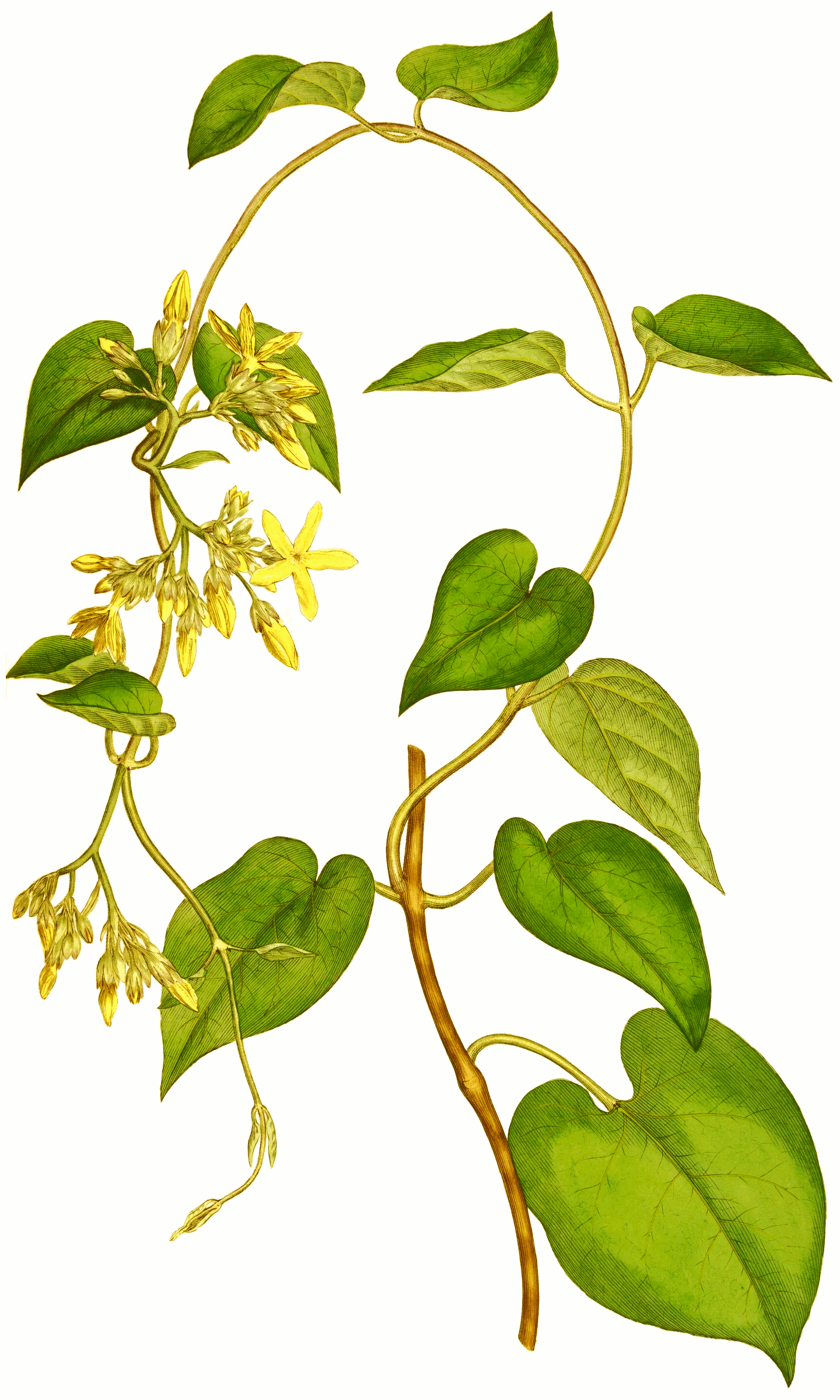
- Telosma cordata

Scientific classification
- Kingdom: Plantae
- Clade: Tracheophytes
- Clade: Angiosperms
- Clade: Eudicots
- Clade: Asterids
- Order: Gentianales
- Family: Apocynaceae
- Genus: Telosma
- Species: T. cordata

Binomial name
- Telosma cordata (Burm.f.) Merr.

Synonyms
- Apocynum odoratissimum Lour. ex Pritz.; Asclepias cordata Burm.f.; Asclepias odoratissima (Lour.) Roxb.; Cynanchum odoratissimum Lour.; Oxystelma ovatum P.T. Li & S.Z. Huang; Pergularia minor Andrews; Pergularia limbata Wall. ex Wight; Pergularia odoratissima (Lour.) Sm.; Pergularia viridis Buch.-Ham. ex Wight; Telosma minor (Andrews) W. G. Craib; Telosma odoratissima (Lour.) Coville

= Telosma cordata =

Species of flowering plant

Telosma cordata is a species of flowering plant in the family Apocynaceae (tribe Marsdenieae), native to China and Indo-China. It is cultivated elsewhere and may occur wild as an introduced species. Common names include Chinese violet, cowslip creeper, Pakalana vine, Tonkin jasmine and Tonkinese creeper. The plant bears clusters of golden yellow blooms along the vining stems during summer months. Individual blooms emerge successively over a period of weeks emitting a rich, heavy fragrance during the day and night.

== Characteristics ==
Telosma cordata is classified as a creeper that can climb as far as 2–5 meters. The vine is small, round and very tough; it is considered poisonous for pigs. As the tree is older, the vine will change from green to brown. The top is covered with dense white bush that can cover other trees completely. The plant can be reproduced by cutting or seeding and grows in airy soil in bright sunlight. It can be found in evergreen, mixed deciduous forests, grove woods and dry forests all over Indo-China.

=== Leaf ===
Telosma cordata has single heart-shaped leaves growing in pairs. The leaf is about 4–7.5 cm wide and about 6–11 cm long with smooth underside. The leaf is very thin, with veins that can be clearly seen. The stem is about 1.2–2 cm long.

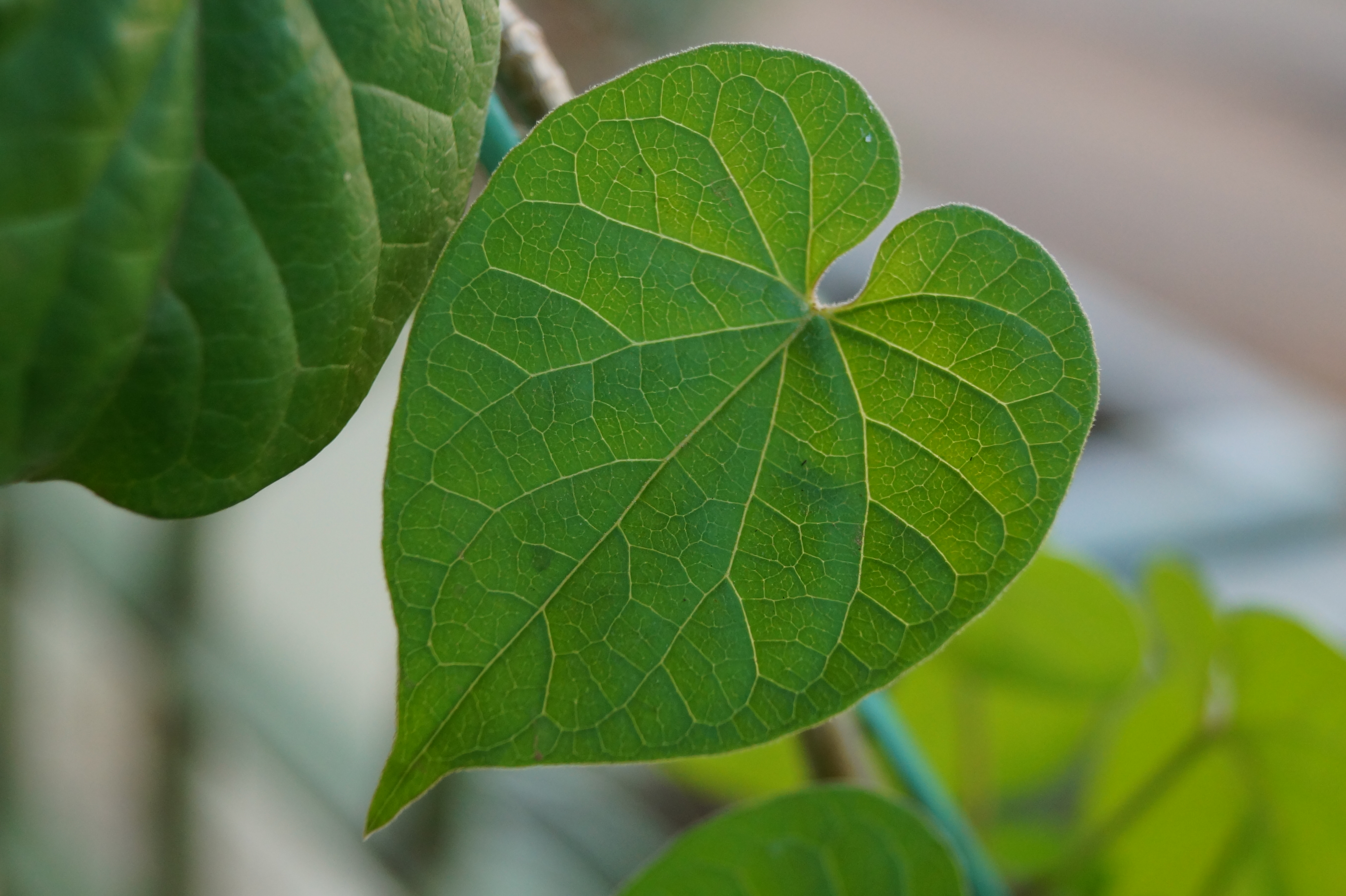

=== Flower ===
The flowers bloom as a bouquet consisting of about 10–20 flowers. The greenish-yellow flower has a strong fragrance especially in the evening. It has a diameter of about 1.5 cm with 5 petals and 5 stamens which are connected to each other and to the pistil. The blooming season is usually March–May, although sometimes flowers can be found in July–October.

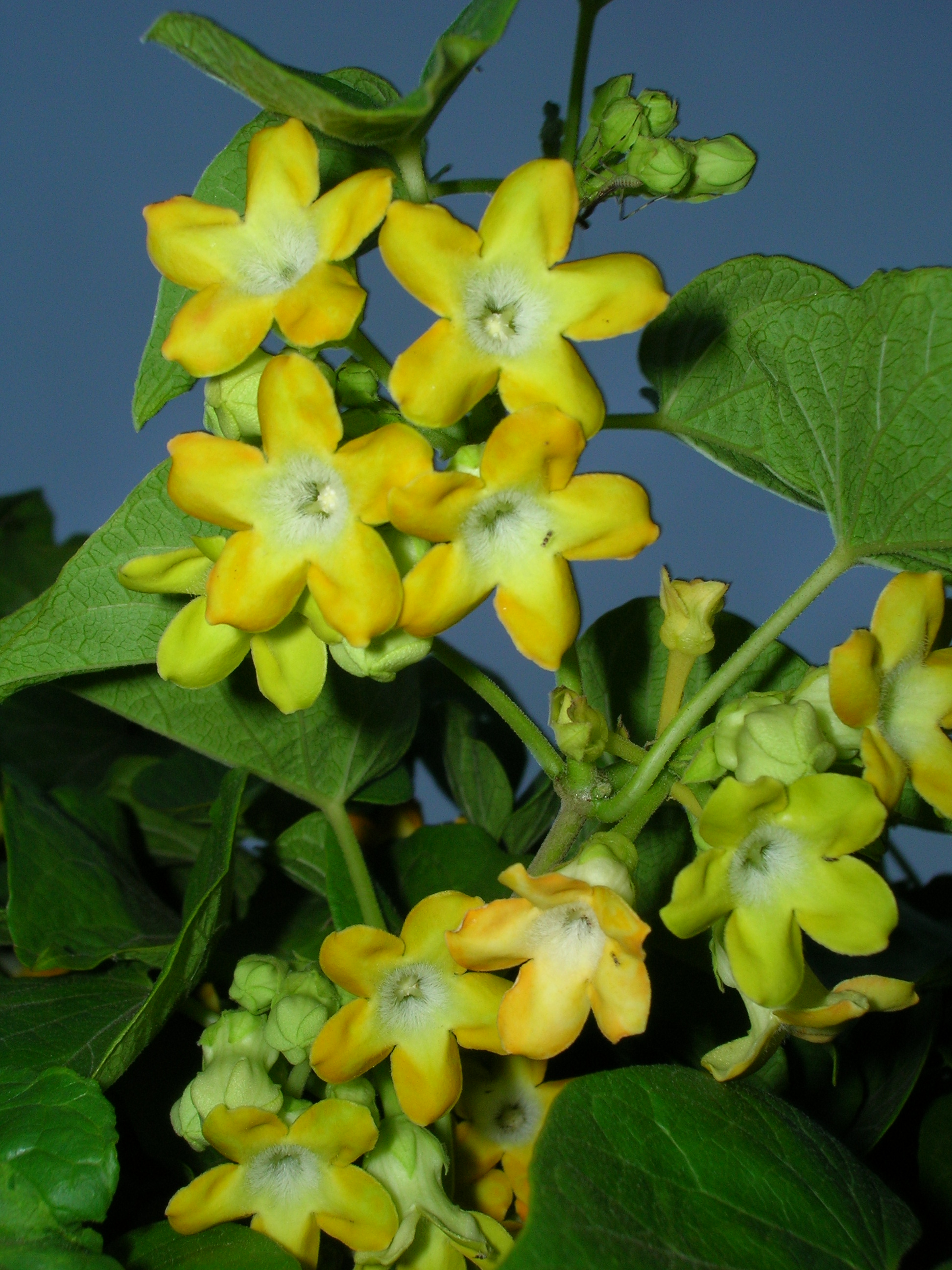
Cowslip creeper flowers

=== Fruit ===
The fruit is smooth, green and round with pointed ends. The interior contains many flat seeds with white fluff attached to the ends. The produce season is around June–August.

== Uses ==
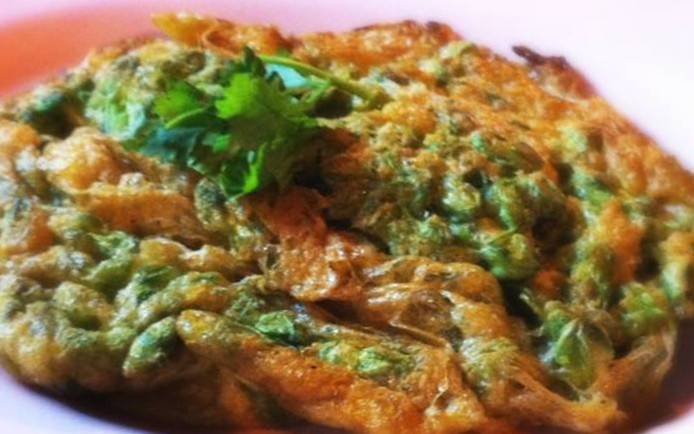
In fried egg

The top, fruit and flowers can all be consumed as vegetables in Southeast Asian cuisines. The top is believed to be the most nutritious part. The flower is used in desserts and for ornamental purposes in bouquets and wreaths. The plant's vines are tough and can be used as ropes. The wood can be used for construction in some cases. The plant has also been used for traditional medicinal purposes, as an antipyretic, an antidote for poison, a tranquilizer, and for the relief of backbone pain. Telosma cordata flower contains antioxidants, including phenolic acids, flavonoids, and anthocyanins; using citric acid during blanching preserved more phenolics and antioxidant activity than water alone. The fower extracts have significant potential to promote neuronal survival and possess notable anti-acetylcholinesterase, neurotrophic, and antioxidant properties.

Nutritions	Value per 100 g.
Carbohydrate	10.6 g.
Protein	5.0 g.
Fat	1.1 g.
Fibre	0.8 g.
Water	80.5 g.
Vitamin A	3.0 g.
Vitamin B1	0.0004 g.
Vitamin B2	0.0015 g.
Vitamin B3	0.0017 g.
Vitamin C	0.68 g.
Calcium	0.7 g.
Iron	0.01 g.
Phosphorus	0.9 g.

== See also ==
- Telosma procumbens
