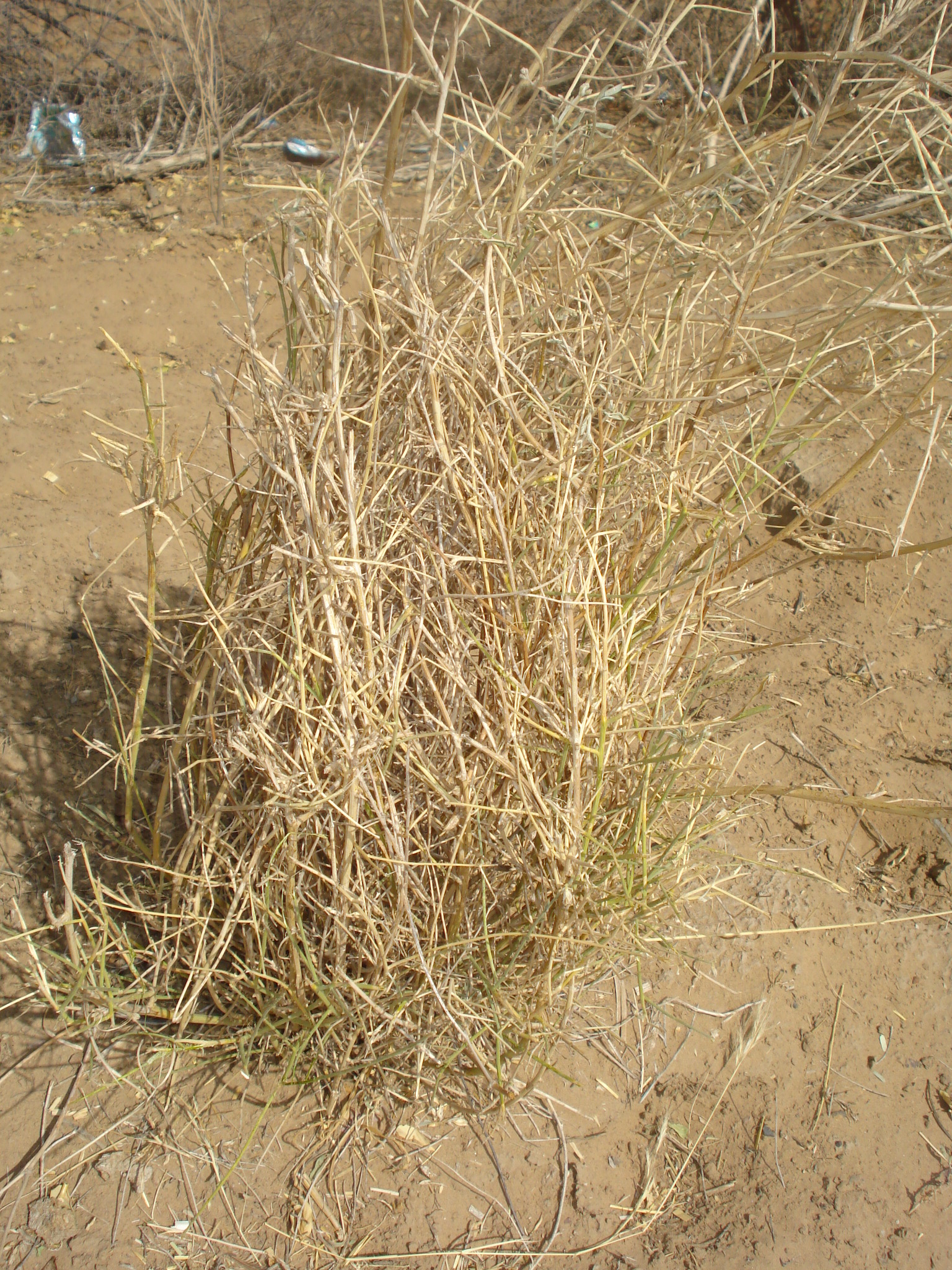

Scientific classification
- Kingdom: Plantae
- Clade: Tracheophytes
- Clade: Angiosperms
- Clade: Eudicots
- Clade: Rosids
- Order: Fabales
- Family: Fabaceae
- Subfamily: Faboideae
- Genus: Crotalaria
- Species: C. burhia

Binomial name
- Crotalaria burhia Buch.-Ham.

= Crotalaria burhia =

Species of plant

Crotalaria burhia (Hindi: saniya सणिया) is a plant found in north-west India, mainly in the Thar Desert region.

== Uses ==
It is a good soil binder and has medicinal value. It is used to make ropes and sheds for animals in the desert and also used to make jhumpa (desert huts). It is a food for goats.
