= Mej River =

River in Rajasthan, India

Coordinates: 25°41′N 76°18′E

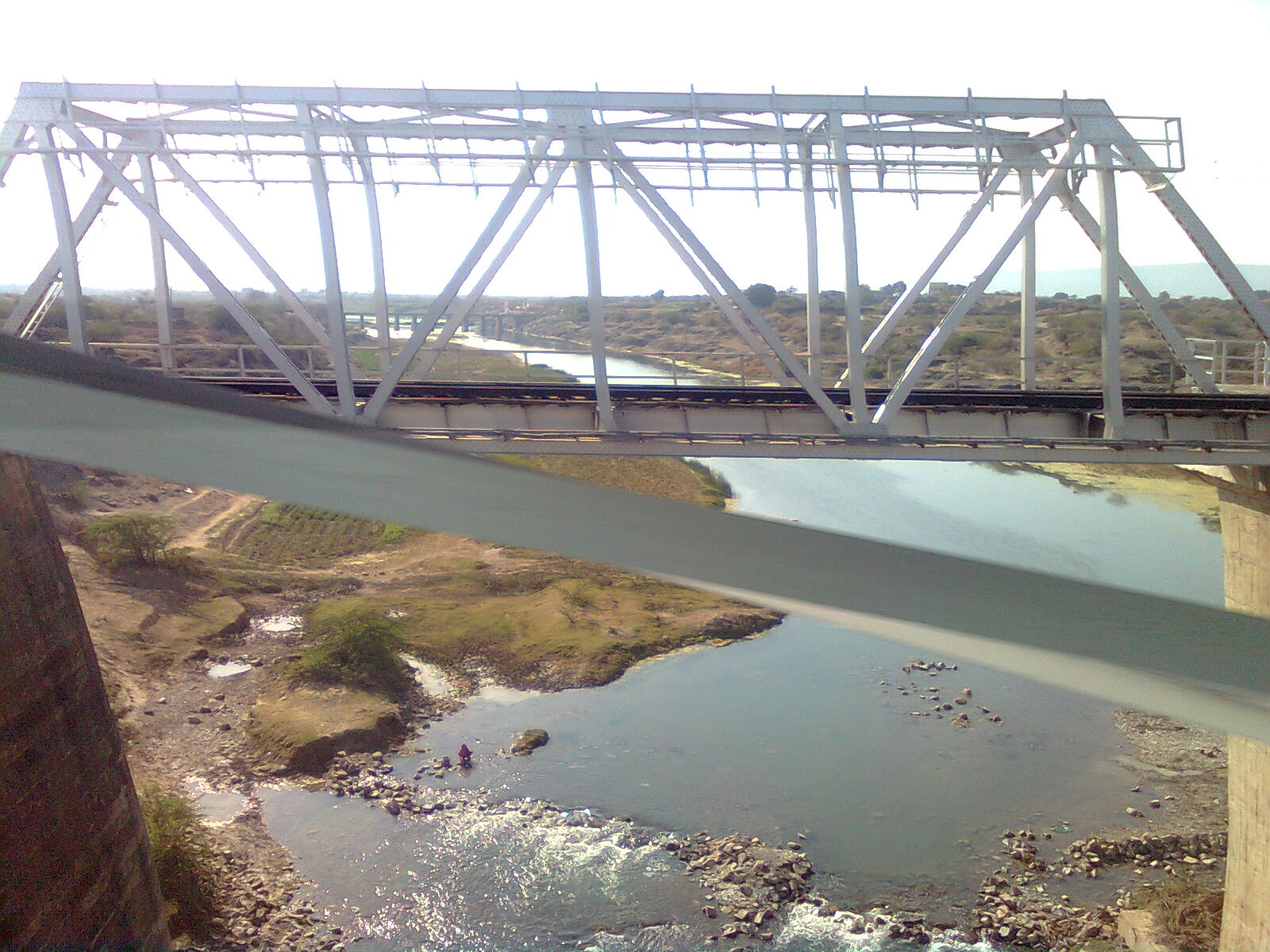
Mej River near Lakheri

The Mej River is a left bank tributary of Chambal River. It originates near Mandalgarh in Bhilwara District and joins Chambal in Kota district. The catchment area of Mej river extends over Bhilwara District, Bundi District, and Tonk District of Rajasthan. The river's tributaries include the Wajan, Kural, Mangali, and Ghoda Pachhad.
