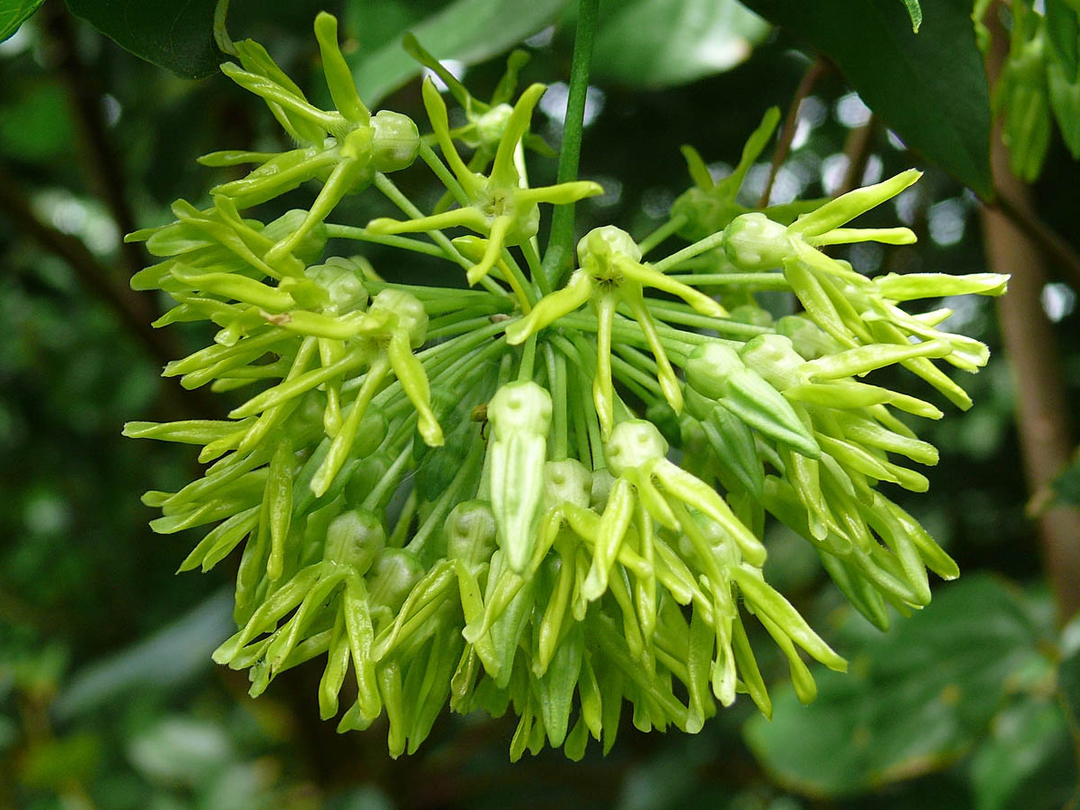
- Kapas-kapas flowers

Scientific classification
- Kingdom: Plantae
- Clade: Tracheophytes
- Clade: Angiosperms
- Clade: Eudicots
- Clade: Asterids
- Order: Gentianales
- Family: Apocynaceae
- Genus: Telosma
- Species: T. procumbens

Binomial name
- Telosma procumbens (Blanco) Merr.

Synonyms
- Cynanchum hirtum Blanco; Pergularia filipes Schltr.; Pergularia glabra Blanco; Pergularia glandulosa Blanco; Pergularia procumbens Blanco; Telosma cathayensis Merr.; Telosma filipes (Schltr.) M.A. Rahman & Wilcock

= Telosma procumbens =

Species of flowering plant

Telosma procumbens, also known as latok, kapas-kapas, dukep, or sabidukong, among many other names, is a species of flowering plant native to the islands of the Philippines and parts of southeastern China and Vietnam. It is a woody vine with elongated heart-shaped leaves. It bears clusters of yellowish green odorless flowers with five twisted-looking fleshy petals arranged in a star shape. These develop into spearhead-shaped fruits with four thin lengthwise ridges ("wings"). The fruit contains multiple seeds stacked in a column. Each seed has a long white feathery tail that allows it to be dispersed by the wind.

The flowers and immature fruit rinds are eaten in Filipino cuisine, with a taste and texture similar to winged beans or string beans.

== See also ==
- Telosma cordata
