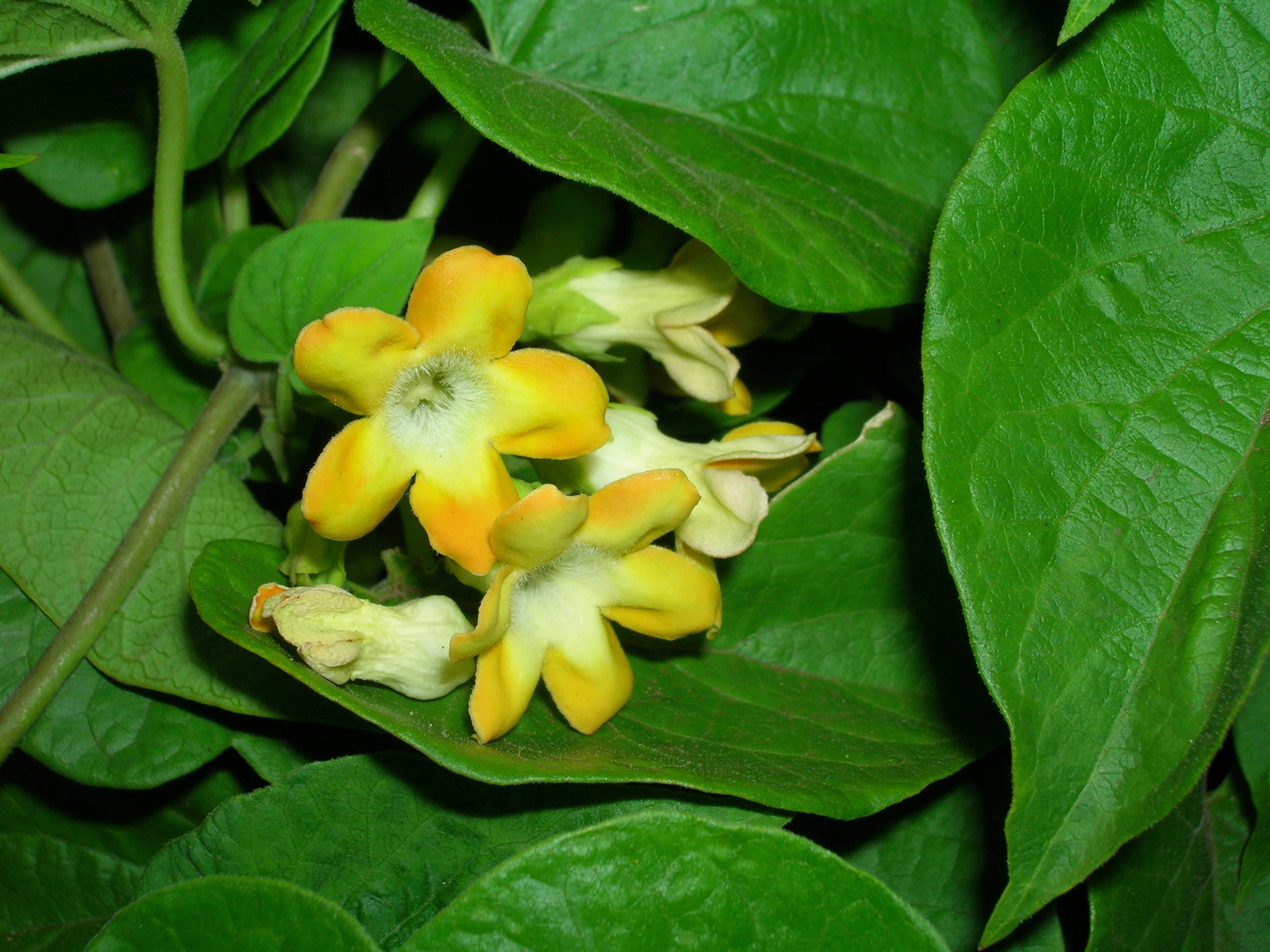
- Telosma cordata

Scientific classification
- Kingdom: Plantae
- Clade: Tracheophytes
- Clade: Angiosperms
- Clade: Eudicots
- Clade: Asterids
- Order: Gentianales
- Family: Apocynaceae
- Subfamily: Asclepiadoideae
- Tribe: Marsdenieae
- Genus: Telosma; Coville, 1905

= Telosma =

Genus of plants

Telosma is a genus of plants in the family Apocynaceae, first described in 1905. It is native to Africa, and Asia.

== Species ==
Accepted species

1. Telosma accedens (Blume) Backer - Java
2. Telosma africana (N.E.Br.) N.E.Br. - South Africa, Madagascar
3. Telosma angustiloba (Warb.) Merr. - Cagayan Province in Philippines
4. Telosma celebica (Warb.) M.A. Rahman & Wilcock - Sulawesi
5. Telosma cordata (Burm. f.) Merr. - S China, Indian Subcontinent, Vietnam; naturalized in Europe, North + South America
6. Telosma pallida (Roxb.) W. G. Craib - Taiwan, Indochina, Indian Subcontinent
7. Telosma procumbens (Blanco) Merr. - Philippines, Vietnam, southeastern China
8. Telosma puberula (Miq.) Kerr - Thailand
9. Telosma unyorensis S. Moore - Uganda

formerly included

Telosma tomentosa, syn of Pergularia tomentosa
