= Thiruvullakkavu Sree Dharma Sastha Temple =

Hindu temple in Kerala, India

- Thiruvullakkavu Sree Dharma Sastha Temple, Cherpu, Thrissur, Kerala

Religion
- Affiliation: Hinduism
- District: Thrissur
- Deity: Dharma Sastha probably Veda Vyasan
- Festival: Navarathri

Location
- Location: Cherpu
- State: Kerala
- Country: India
- Interactive map of Thiruvullakkavu Sree Dharma Sastha Temple
- Coordinates: 10°26′43″N 76°12′57″E

Architecture
- Type: Architecture of Kerala

Specifications
- Temple: One
- Elevation: 42.46 m (139 ft)

The Thuiruvullakkavu Sree Dharma Sastha Temple is a Hindu temple located in Cherpu of Thrissur district of Kerala. The deity is Lord Dharma Shastha in standing posture with arch and a bow. An enchanting shrine in the midst of a dense forest, a gusher of beneficent spirit-that was the temple of Thiruvullakkavu, centuries back. Lord Sastha, the presiding deity, as the divine protector of the whole village settlement, showered benediction on a cultured rave. He rode the boundaries of the settlement on His white charger; the pure, microcosmic soul. Full of devotion, the people reveled in the ineffable tenderness of Sastha. A peaceful refuge for the troubled soul that was Thiruvullakkavu.

Kavu is a throbbing beehive of spiritual activities today. Thousands bring their children to this well constructed temple for the initiation into the excitement of knowledge. A child which starts on the alphabets at Kavu is sure to become a scholar, the devotees believe. An unending stream of devotees flow to this temple on Vijaya Dasami, the most auspicious morning of the year for those who seek academic excellence.

Kavu is unique, Lord Sasta, the Thanthric texts assert, is a fiery deity, the divine Hunter who destroys the sinners and protects the virtuous. He is the personification of fierce, protective Love. But at Thiruvullakkavu, He blesses His children with enough wits to earn prosperity to the point of satiety. Later, they become wise enough to renounce it and seek the path of bliss. Verily, Thiruvullakkavu is THE ABODE OF WISDOM.

== See also ==
- Paṭṭattu Vāsudeva Bhaṭṭatiri
