= Narishyanta =

King in Hindu mythology

- Texts: Puranas

Genealogy
- Parents: Marutta (father)
- Siblings: Seventeen brothers
- Spouse: Indrasena
- Children: Dama
- Dynasty: Suryavamsha

Narishyanta (Sanskrit: नरिष्यन्त, romanized: Nariṣyanta) is a king of the Suryavamsha (Solar dynasty) in Hindu mythology. He is described to be the son of Marutta and the father of Dama. Narishyanta is also the name of another king of the Solar dynasty, stated to be a son of Vaivasvata Manu.

== Legend ==
=== Sacrifice ===
The Markandeya Purana describes Narishyanta to be the eldest of the eighteen sons of King Marutta, ascending the throne after his father's abdication and retirement to the forests. After starting his reign, Narishyanta wished to imitate the deeds of his ancestors by performing ritual sacrifices and offering riches, but regarded himself to be unable to match their legendary exploits. Hence, he decided to innovate by holding a grand sacrifice, which would be performed by Brahmanas, rather than personally partaking in the rites himself. He offered great wealth upon all the Brahmanas who attended his ritual, including food, cattle, ornaments, sufficient for each of their lifetimes. When Narishyanta held a similar sacrifice once again, no Brahmana desired to attend it due to their surfeit of luxuries, and requested that he call upon others who had not received his wealth. Despite being the sovereign of the entire world, the king received no sacrificial priests during the ceremony, having enriched all of them. Conceding, Narishyanta invited the Brahmanas to a sacrifice that he personally performed. During this event, when the king offered a sacrifice, there were no spectators present, and tens of millions of Brahmanas offered the wealth that they had been granted as their own sacrifice. This episode is offered as a testament to the righteousness of the king.

=== Death ===
Dama, the son of Narishyanta by his wife, Indrasena, married a princess named Sumana after she chose him during her svayamvara ceremony. Wishing to retire to the forests after his reign, Narishyanta decided to abdicate his throne in favour of Dama, departing with his wife. The couple started to practise an austere lifestyle, becoming ascetics. Vapushman, one of the kings who had opposed the marriage of Dama and Sumana and had been previously defeated during the svayamvara came across the couple. After Indrasena revealed their identities to him, the vengeful king seized Narishyanta by his matted hair and beheaded him. The grieving Indrasena sent a messenger to her son Dama, informing him of the transgression that had transpired. She then joined her husband in his funeral pyre in accordance to the practice of sati. Dama avenged the death of his parents by attacking Vapushman's kingdom and killing him in battle.
