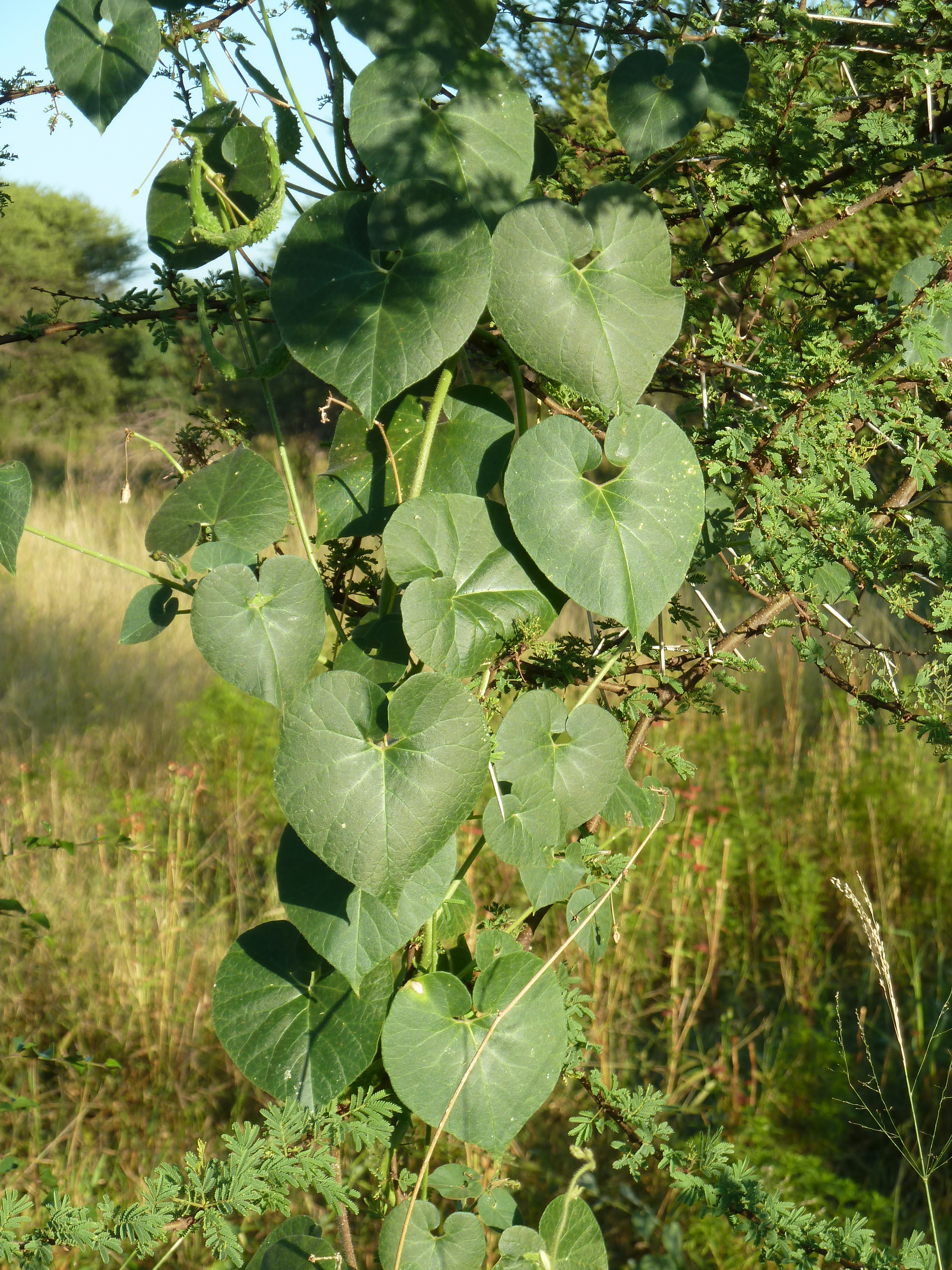
- In Limpopo, South Africa

Scientific classification
- Kingdom: Plantae
- Clade: Tracheophytes
- Clade: Angiosperms
- Clade: Eudicots
- Clade: Asterids
- Order: Gentianales
- Family: Apocynaceae
- Genus: Pergularia
- Species: P. daemia

Binomial name
- Pergularia daemia (Forssk.) Chiov.

Synonyms
- P. daemia (Forssk.) Blatt. & McCann; P. extensa (Jacq.) N.E.Br.; Asclepias daemia Forssk.; Daemia extensa (Jacq.) R.Br. ex Schult.

= Pergularia daemia =

Species of vine

Pergularia daemia, the trellis-vine, is a hispid, perennial vine in the family Asclepiadaceae, with an extensive range in the Old World tropics and subtropics. It has been used traditionally to treat a number of ailments. It is sometimes called atufa.

== Range and habitat ==
It occurs from the Malay Peninsula to Burma, India, Sri Lanka, Pakistan, Afghanistan through Arabia and Egypt to central and southern Africa. It is found along roadsides, in woodland or along riparian forest fringes.

== Description ==
The opposite and broadly ovate to suborbicular leaves are very variable in size, with petioles of varying length. The leaves are almost glabrous above and velvety below.

In the northern hemisphere the flowers appear from mid to late winter, and these are carried on lateral cymes. The flower corolla forms a greenish-yellow or dull white tube. The fruit mature after some 13 to 14 months when they release ovate seeds covered with velvety hairs.

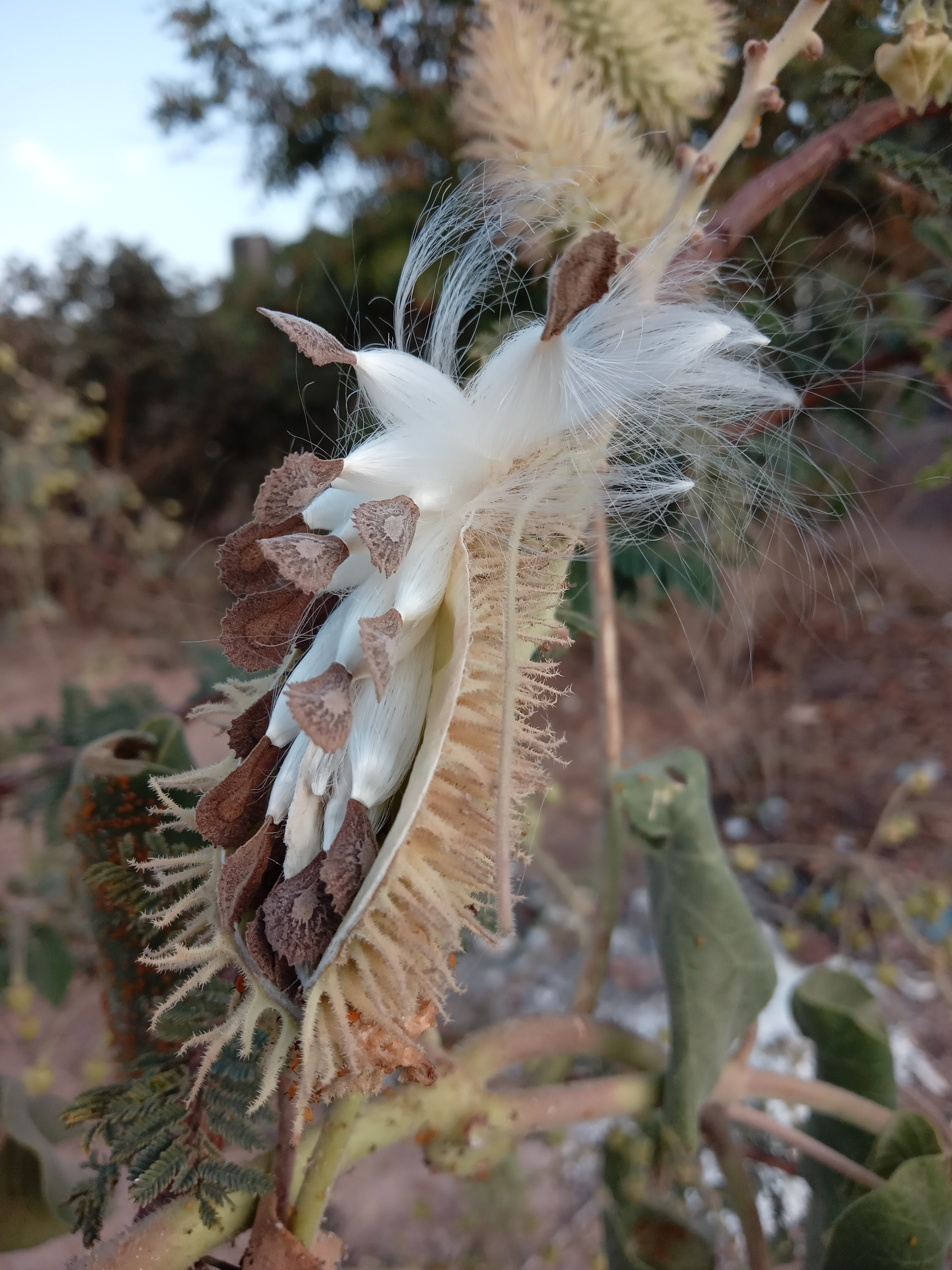
Pergularia daemia (Trellis-vine) seeds

== Phytochemical properties ==
Terpenoids, flavonoids, sterols and cardenolides are among the chemicals that have been isolated from either the leaves, stems, shoots, roots, seeds or fruit. Traditionally it has been used as an anthelmintic, laxative, antipyretic and expectorant, besides treatment of infantile diarrhoea, malarial intermittent fevers, toothaches and colds. Studies have shown hepatoprotective, antifertility, anti-diabetic, analgesic, antipyretic and anti-inflammatory properties of substances in its aerial parts.

== Associated species ==
The larvae of the African monarch butterfly (Danaus chrysippus aegyptius) feed on this species.
