= List of Monuments of National Importance in Rajasthan =

This is a list of Monuments of National Importance (ASI) as officially recognized by and available through the website of the Archaeological Survey of India in the Indian state Rajasthan. The monument identifier is a combination of the abbreviation of the subdivision of the list (state, ASI circle) and the numbering as published on the website of the ASI. 163 Monuments of National Importance have been recognized by the ASI in Rajasthan.

== List of Monuments ==
SL. No.	Description	Location	Address	District	Coordinates	Image
N-RJ-1	Adhai-Din-ka-Jhonpra	Ajmer		Ajmer	26°27′19″N 74°37′31″E	Adhai-Din-ka-Jhonpra More images
N-RJ-2	Baori on the Ajmer-Jaipur Road	Ajmer		Ajmer	26°29′56″N 74°40′35″E	Upload Photo
N-RJ-3	Badshahi Haveli	Ajmer		Ajmer	26°27′41″N 74°37′52″E	Badshahi Haveli More images
N-RJ-4	Delhi Gate consisting of one archway	Ajmer		Ajmer	26°27′44″N 74°37′39″E	Delhi Gate consisting of one archway More images
N-RJ-5	Gateway of Taragarh Hill	Ajmer		Ajmer	26°26′37″N 74°37′00″E	Upload Photo
N-RJ-6	Marble Pavilions and Balustrade on the Ana Sagar Bandh and the Ruins of the Marble Hamman behind the Ana Sagar Bandh	Ajmer		Ajmer	26°28′13″N 74°37′51″E	Marble Pavilions and Balustrade on the Ana Sagar Bandh and the Ruins of the Marble Hamman behind the Ana Sagar Bandh More images
N-RJ-7	Saheli Bazar Buildings in Daulat Bagh	Ajmer		Ajmer	26°28′12″N 74°37′56″E	Upload Photo
N-RJ-8	Tomb of Allauddin Khan known as "Sola Khumba"	Ajmer		Ajmer	26°27′22″N 74°37′38″E	Tomb of Allauddin Khan known as "Sola Khumba"
N-RJ-9	Tomb of Abdulla Khan and his wife	Ajmer		Ajmer	26°27′09″N 74°38′14″E	Tomb of Abdulla Khan and his wife
N-RJ-10	Tripolia Gate	Ajmer		Ajmer	26°27′22″N 74°37′36″E	Tripolia Gate More images
N-RJ-11	Magazine Building in Akbar Fort	Ajmer		Ajmer	26°27′38″N 74°37′59″E	Magazine Building in Akbar Fort More images
N-RJ-12	Kos Minar erected by Emperor Akbar	Ajmer-Jaipur Road	as per ASI Jaipur Circle	Ajmer	26°27′22″N 74°37′38″E	Upload Photo
N-RJ-13	Kos Minar erected by Emperor Akbar	Ajmer-Jaipur Road		Ajmer	26°28′39″N 74°39′28″E	Upload Photo
N-RJ-14	Kos Minar erected by Emperor Akbar	Chhatri		Ajmer	26°33′58″N 74°42′24″E	Upload Photo
N-RJ-15	Sarai	Chhatri		Ajmer	26°33′49″N 74°42′51″E	Upload Photo
N-RJ-16	Kos Minar erected by Emperor Akbar	Chugra		Ajmer	26°29′27″N 74°40′35″E	Upload Photo
N-RJ-17	Kos Minar erected by Emperor Akbar	Hoshiara		Ajmer	26°36′44″N 74°44′32″E	Upload Photo
N-RJ-18	Kos Minar erected by Emperor Akbar	Hoshiara		Ajmer	26°38′15″N 74°45′18″E	Upload Photo
N-RJ-19	Kos Minar erected by Emperor Akbar	Kayad		Ajmer	26°32′30″N 74°41′30″E	Upload Photo
N-RJ-20	Kos Minar erected by Emperor Akbar	Kayampura		Ajmer	26°35′16″N 74°43′30″E	Upload Photo
N-RJ-21	Mahal Badshahi	Pushkar		Ajmer	26°29′05″N 74°33′17″E	Mahal Badshahi
N-RJ-22	Bhandasar Jain Temple	Bikaner		Bikaner	28°00′17″N 73°18′03″E	Bhandasar Jain Temple More images
N-RJ-23	Jain Temple of Suswani Goddess	Morkhana	Maa Suswani Mata Temple Morkhana, Morkhana, Rajasthan 334202	Bikaner	27°45′03″N 73°32′27″E	Jain Temple of Suswani Goddess More images
N-RJ-24	Siva temple and ruins	Arthuna		Banswara	23°29′35″N 74°06′01″E	Siva temple and ruins More images
N-RJ-25	Mahakal and two other temples	Bijolia		Bhilwara	25°09′24″N 75°19′41″E	Mahakal and two other temples More images
N-RJ-26	Rock Inscriptions (12th century)	Bijolia		Bhilwara		Upload Photo
N-RJ-27	Rock Inscriptions within the Paraswanath Temple compound (12th century)	Bijolia		Bhilwara	25°08′58″N 75°20′15″E	Upload Photo
N-RJ-28	Ancient temple known as Kaneriki Putali	Kharipur village		Bhilwara	25°08′31″N 75°13′34″E	Upload Photo
N-RJ-29	Wall Paintings of Hardoti School in the palace (Garh Palace)	Bundi		Bundi	25°26′57″N 75°38′08″E	Wall Paintings of Hardoti School in the palace (Garh Palace) More images
N-RJ-30	Ancient Mound	Nainwa		Bundi		Upload Photo
N-RJ-31	Ancient Mound	Keshwarai Patan		Bundi		Upload Photo
N-RJ-32	Ghateshwar Temple (part of Baroli temple complex)	Badoli, Rawatbhata		Chittaurgarh	24°57′30″N 75°35′36″E	Ghateshwar Temple (part of Baroli temple complex) More images
N-RJ-33	Kund (part of Baroli temple complex)	Badoli, Rawatbhata		Chittaurgarh	24°57′32″N 75°35′37″E	Upload Photo
N-RJ-34	Shrinagar Chawri (part of Baroli temple complex)	Badoli, Rawatbhata		Chittaurgarh	24°57′31″N 75°35′37″E	Shrinagar Chawri (part of Baroli temple complex) More images
N-RJ-35	Temple of Ashtamata (part of Baroli temple complex)	Badoli, Rawatbhata		Chittaurgarh	24°57′30″N 75°35′36″E	Temple of Ashtamata (part of Baroli temple complex) More images
N-RJ-36	Temple of Ganesh (part of Baroli temple complex)	Badoli, Rawatbhata		Chittaurgarh	24°57′30″N 75°35′36″E	Temple of Ganesh (part of Baroli temple complex) More images
N-RJ-37	Temple of Sheshashayan (part of Baroli temple complex)	Badoli, Rawatbhata		Chittaurgarh	24°57′30″N 75°35′36″E	Upload Photo
N-RJ-38	Temple of Shiv and Kund (part of Baroli temple complex)	Badoli, Rawatbhata		Chittaurgarh	24°57′30″N 75°35′36″E	Temple of Shiv and Kund (part of Baroli temple complex) More images
N-RJ-39	Temple of Trimurti (part of Baroli temple complex)	Badoli, Rawatbhata		Chittaurgarh	24°57′30″N 75°35′36″E	Temple of Trimurti (part of Baroli temple complex) More images
N-RJ-40	Temple of Vamanavatar known as Narad Temple (part of Baroli temple complex)	Badoli, Rawatbhata		Chittaurgarh	24°57′30″N 75°35′36″E	Temple of Vamanavatar known as Narad Temple (part of Baroli temple complex) More images
N-RJ-41	Fort of Chittaur as a whole (Chittorgarh Fort)	Chittaur		Chittaurgarh	24°53′11″N 74°38′49″E	Fort of Chittaur as a whole (Chittorgarh Fort) More images
N-RJ-42	Mahanal Temple & Math	Menal		Chittaurgarh	25°05′35″N 75°10′20″E	Mahanal Temple & Math More images
N-RJ-43	Ancient Ruins	Nagari		Chittaurgarh	24°58′12″N 74°40′46″E	Ancient Ruins More images
N-RJ-44	Hathiwada enclosure with inscription together with adjacent in S.Plot No. 301 (archaeological site of the Hathibada Inscription)	Nagari		Chittaurgarh	24°58′33″N 74°41′20″E	Hathiwada enclosure with inscription together with adjacent in S.Plot No. 301 (archaeological site of the Hathibada Inscription) More images
N-RJ-45	Ancient site and remains together with adjacent area comprised in whole of survey no.2 : 991,992,993,994/1,994/3, 995,996,997,998,999,1000 and 1002.	Nagari		Chittaurgarh	24°58′14″N 74°40′49″E	Upload Photo
N-RJ-46	Archaeological sites & remains	Nilodh / Jeora		Chittaurgarh		Upload Photo
N-RJ-47	Ancient Mounds	Badopal		Hanumangarh		Upload Photo
N-RJ-48	Ancient Mounds	Bhadrakali		Hanumangarh		Upload Photo
N-RJ-49	Ancient Mounds	Dhokal		Hanumangarh		Upload Photo
N-RJ-50	Fort Bhatner	Hanumangarh		Hanumangarh	29°35′08″N 74°19′31″E	Fort Bhatner More images
N-RJ-51	Three Ancient Mounds	Kalibangan		Hanumangarh	29°28′26″N 74°07′47″E	Three Ancient Mounds More images
N-RJ-52	Ancient Mounds	Manaktheri		Hanumangarh		Upload Photo
N-RJ-53	Ancient Mounds	Munda		Hanumangarh		Upload Photo
N-RJ-54	Ancient Mounds	Peer Sultan		Hanumangarh		Upload Photo
N-RJ-55	Ancient Mounds	Pilibangan		Hanumangarh		Upload Photo
N-RJ-56	Two Ancient Mounds	Mathula		Ganganagar		Upload Photo
N-RJ-57	Ancient Mounds	Chak 86		Ganganagar		Upload Photo
N-RJ-58	Ancient Mounds	Bhannar Thedi		Ganganagar		Upload Photo
N-RJ-59	Ancient Mounds	Binjor		Ganganagar		Upload Photo
N-RJ-60	Ancient Mounds	Baror		Ganganagar		Upload Photo
N-RJ-61	Ancient Mounds	Rang Mahal		Ganganagar		Upload Photo
N-RJ-62	Ancient Mounds	Tarkhanwala Dera		Ganganagar		Upload Photo
N-RJ-63	Jain Temple Inscription	Baroda		Dungarpur	23°54′13″N 74°03′22″E	Upload Photo
N-RJ-64	Somnath Temple	Deo Somnath		Dungarpur	23°56′26″N 73°51′41″E	Somnath Temple More images
N-RJ-65	Buddhist Caves and Pillars	Binnayaga (Dag)		Jhalawar	24°03′45″N 75°53′37″E	Buddhist Caves and Pillars More images
N-RJ-66	Caves of Naranjani etc.	Binnayaga (Dag)		Jhalawar		Upload Photo
N-RJ-67	Ancient Ruins	Dalsanagar (Gangadhar)		Jhalawar		Upload Photo
N-RJ-68	Ancient Ruins	Dudhaliya (Dag)		Jhalawar		Upload Photo
N-RJ-69	Buddhist Caves	Hathiagor		Jhalawar	24°06′39″N 75°51′53″E	Upload Photo
N-RJ-70	Buddhist Caves, Pillars, Idols	Kolvi (Dag)		Jhalawar	24°00′38″N 75°50′59″E	Buddhist Caves, Pillars, Idols More images
N-RJ-71	Old Temples near the Chandrabhaga	Jhalrapatan		Jhalawar	24°31′47″N 76°10′40″E	Old Temples near the Chandrabhaga More images
N-RJ-72	Ancient Mound	Abaneri		Dausa		Upload Photo
N-RJ-73	Baori (Chand Baori)	Abaneri		Dausa	27°00′26″N 76°36′23″E	Baori (Chand Baori) More images
N-RJ-74	Harsat Mata ka Mandir	Abaneri		Dausa	27°00′27″N 76°36′19″E	Harsat Mata ka Mandir More images
N-RJ-75	Banjaron ki Chhatri (containing two pillars similar to railing pillars of Bharhut Stupa)	Lalsot		Dausa	26°33′43″N 76°19′35″E	Upload Photo
N-RJ-76	Ancient Mound	Maheshra		Dausa		Upload Photo
N-RJ-77	Ancient Mound	Raniwas		Dausa		Upload Photo
N-RJ-78	Ancient Mound	Sikrai		Dausa		Upload Photo
N-RJ-79	Sun Temple	Amber		Jaipur	26°59′23″N 75°51′00″E	Sun Temple More images
N-RJ-80	Jama Masjid	Amber		Jaipur	26°59′20″N 75°51′22″E	Jama Masjid More images
N-RJ-81	Laxmi Narain's Temple	Amber		Jaipur	26°59′17″N 75°51′20″E	Laxmi Narain's Temple More images
N-RJ-82	Sri Jagat Siromani ji temple	Amber		Jaipur	26°59′21″N 75°51′05″E	Sri Jagat Siromani ji temple More images
N-RJ-83	Pundrik ji-ki-Haveli Paintings in a room	Brahmpuri		Jaipur	26°56′12″N 75°49′30″E	Upload Photo
N-RJ-84	Temple containing Fresco paintings	Gulta ji		Jaipur	26°55′03″N 75°51′25″E	Temple containing Fresco paintings More images
N-RJ-85	Excavated Site	Sambhar		Jaipur		Excavated Site
N-RJ-86	Excavated Site	Bairat Viratnagar		Jaipur	27°25′02″N 76°09′44″E	Excavated Site More images
N-RJ-87	Fort including Ancient Temples (Jaisalmer Fort)	Jaisalmer		Jaisalmer	26°54′45″N 70°54′45″E	Fort including Ancient Temples (Jaisalmer Fort) More images
N-RJ-88	Ancient Site	Lodruva Patan		Jaisalmer		Upload Photo
N-RJ-89	Fort (Mandore Fort)	Mandore		Jodhpur	26°21′13″N 73°01′59″E	Fort (Mandore Fort) More images
N-RJ-90	Ruins of Temples	Ganesh-Ganj or Atru		Baran	24°52′18″N 76°40′01″E	Upload Photo
N-RJ-91	Yupa Pillars	Badwa		Baran	25°05′39″N 76°20′49″E	Upload Photo
N-RJ-92	Temple (12th century)	Baran		Baran	25°06′09″N 76°31′37″E	Upload Photo
N-RJ-93	Ancient Ruins and Structural Remains	Krishnavilas		Baran	25°02′09″N 76°44′12″E	Ancient Ruins and Structural Remains More images
N-RJ-94	Old Temples, Statues and Inscriptions	Shargarh		Baran	24°42′18″N 76°32′33″E	Upload Photo
N-RJ-95	Siva Temple and two unpublished Gupta Inscriptions	Charchoma		Kota	25°05′39″N 76°07′24″E	Siva Temple and two unpublished Gupta Inscriptions More images
N-RJ-96	Temple, Fort wall and Statues	Dara or Mukandara		Kota	24°48′53″N 75°59′09″E	Temple, Fort wall and Statues More images
N-RJ-97	Temple with Inscriptions	Kanswa		Kota	25°08′41″N 75°52′58″E	Temple with Inscriptions More images
N-RJ-98	Percian Inscriptions in a Baori	Alanpur		Sawai Madhopur	26°00′01″N 76°21′59″E	Upload Photo
N-RJ-99	Jain Temple	Sawai Madhopur		Sawai Madhopur	26°00′03″N 76°21′49″E	Jain Temple More images
N-RJ-100	Ranthambhor Fort	Ranthambor		Sawai Madhopur	26°01′15″N 76°27′18″E	Ranthambhor Fort More images
N-RJ-101	Harshnath Temple	Sikar		Sikar	27°30′00″N 75°10′21″E	Harshnath Temple More images
N-RJ-102	Bisal Deo ji's Temple	Bisalpur		Tonk	25°55′38″N 75°27′26″E	Bisal Deo ji's Temple More images
N-RJ-103	Ancient Mound	Bundwali Doongri		Tonk		Upload Photo
N-RJ-104	Ancient Mound	Gariagarh (Newai)		Tonk		Upload Photo
N-RJ-105	Devapura Barodia Mounds	Jhalia		Tonk		Upload Photo
N-RJ-106	Hathi Bhata	Khera		Tonk	25°59′35″N 75°55′27″E	Upload Photo
N-RJ-107	Ancient Mound	Nagar		Tonk		Upload Photo
N-RJ-108	Excavated Site	Nagar		Tonk		Upload Photo
N-RJ-109	Inscription in Fort	Nagar		Tonk		Upload Photo
N-RJ-110	Mand Kila Tal Inscription	Nagar		Tonk		Upload Photo
N-RJ-111	Yupa Pillars in Bichpuria Temple	Nagar		Tonk		Upload Photo
N-RJ-112	Inscription	Panwar		Tonk		Upload Photo
N-RJ-113	Excavated Site	Rairh (Newai)		Tonk		Upload Photo
N-RJ-114	Kala Pahar Temple	Todarai Singh		Tonk	26°01′26″N 75°29′08″E	Upload Photo
N-RJ-115	Kalyanrai ji's Temple	Todarai Singh		Tonk	26°01′33″N 75°29′10″E	Upload Photo
N-RJ-116	Laxmi Narainji's Temple locally known as Gopinathji's Temple	Todarai Singh		Tonk	26°01′29″N 75°29′08″E	Upload Photo
N-RJ-117	Old Baories locally known as Hadirani-ka-kund	Todarai Singh		Tonk	26°01′14″N 75°28′43″E	Old Baories locally known as Hadirani-ka-kund More images
N-RJ-118	Pipa ji's Temple	Todarai Singh		Tonk	26°01′19″N 75°29′14″E	Upload Photo
N-RJ-119	Akbar's Chhatri	Bayana		Bharatpur	26°54′07″N 77°17′21″E	Upload Photo
N-RJ-120	Ancient Fort with its Monuments (Bijai Garh/Bayana Fort)	Bayana		Bharatpur	26°53′11″N 77°14′12″E	Ancient Fort with its Monuments (Bijai Garh/Bayana Fort) More images
N-RJ-121	Brahmabad Idgah	Bayana		Bharatpur	26°55′09″N 77°19′00″E	Upload Photo
N-RJ-122	Islam Shah's Gate	Bayana		Bharatpur	26°55′31″N 77°19′28″E	Upload Photo
N-RJ-123	Jahangir's Gateway	Bayana		Bharatpur	26°54′30″N 77°17′22″E	Upload Photo
N-RJ-124	Jhajri	Bayana		Bharatpur	26°54′05″N 77°17′20″E	Upload Photo
N-RJ-125	Saraj Sad-ullah	Bayana		Bharatpur	26°54′12″N 77°17′23″E	Upload Photo
N-RJ-126	Usa Mandir	Bayana		Bharatpur	26°54′23″N 77°17′10″E	Upload Photo
N-RJ-127	Lodhi's Minar	Bayana		Bharatpur	26°54′24″N 77°17′10″E	Upload Photo
N-RJ-128	Delhi Gate outside the Bharatpur Fort	Bharatpur		Bharatpur	27°13′27″N 77°29′33″E	Upload Photo
N-RJ-129	Fateh Burj near Anah Gate	Bharatpur		Bharatpur	27°13′23″N 77°30′14″E	Upload Photo
N-RJ-130	Jawahar Burj and Ashtadhatu Gateway inside the Bharatpur Fort (Lohagarh Fort)	Bharatpur		Bharatpur	27°13′23″N 77°29′40″E	Jawahar Burj and Ashtadhatu Gateway inside the Bharatpur Fort (Lohagarh Fort) More images
N-RJ-131	Moat surrounding the Fort wall (Lohagarh Fort)	Bharatpur		Bharatpur	27°13′15″N 77°29′30″E	Moat surrounding the Fort wall (Lohagarh Fort) More images
N-RJ-132	Fort walls including Chowburja gate and approach bridges at the Chowburja and Ashtadhatu gates (Lohagarh Fort)	Bharatpur		Bharatpur	27°13′01″N 77°29′45″E	Fort walls including Chowburja gate and approach bridges at the Chowburja and Ashtadhatu gates (Lohagarh Fort) More images
N-RJ-133	Deeg Bhawans (Palace)	Deeg		Bharatpur	27°28′20″N 77°19′25″E	Deeg Bhawans (Palace) More images
N-RJ-134	Looted gun (at Deeg Fort)	Deeg		Bharatpur	27°28′21″N 77°19′41″E	Upload Photo
N-RJ-135	Marble Jholla	Deeg		Bharatpur	27°28′20″N 77°19′26″E	Marble Jholla More images
N-RJ-136	Kaccha Bag	Deeg		Bharatpur	27°28′24″N 77°19′17″E	Kaccha Bag More images
N-RJ-137	Chaurasi Khamba temple	Kaman		Bharatpur	27°39′04″N 77°15′57″E	Upload Photo
N-RJ-138	Ancient Mound	Malah		Bharatpur		Upload Photo
N-RJ-139	Ancient Mound	Noh		Bharatpur		Upload Photo
N-RJ-140	Colossal image of Yaksha	Noh		Bharatpur		Upload Photo
N-RJ-141	Lal Mahal	Rupvas		Bharatpur	26°59′33″N 77°35′23″E	Upload Photo
N-RJ-142a	Shiva temple	Garh Neelkanth		Alwar	27°14′51″N 76°21′07″E	Shiva temple More images
N-RJ-142b	Nogaja/Nangaj (S-RJ-13) old number	Garh Neelkanth		Alwar	27°14′46″N 76°20′57″E	Nogaja/Nangaj (S-RJ-13) old number More images
N-RJ-143a	Ancient site (Bhangarh Fort)	Bhangarh		Alwar	27°05′41″N 76°17′29″E	Ancient site (Bhangarh Fort) More images
N-RJ-143b	Someshwar Mahadeva (S-RJ-17) old number	Bhangarh		Alwar	27°05′43″N 76°17′12″E	Someshwar Mahadeva (S-RJ-17) old number More images
N-RJ-144	Ancient Remains	Pandupol		Alwar	27°19′08″N 76°26′10″E	Ancient Remains More images
N-RJ-145	Lal Masjid	Tijara		Alwar	27°55′59″N 76°51′51″E	Upload Photo
N-RJ-146	Ancient Ruins	Kalyanpur		Udaipur	24°00′31″N 73°45′16″E	Upload Photo
N-RJ-147	Sahastra Bahu Temples	Nagda		Udaipur	24°44′07″N 73°42′59″E	Sahastra Bahu Temples More images
N-RJ-148	Fort of Kumbhalgarh as a whole	Kumbhalgarh		Rajasamand	25°08′52″N 73°35′00″E	Fort of Kumbhalgarh as a whole More images
N-RJ-149	Ghat with inscriptions pavilions and Toranas (together with adjacent area comprised in S.Plot No. 344).	Nav Chowki Rajsamand		Rajasamand	25°04′06″N 73°52′33″E	Ghat with inscriptions pavilions and Toranas (together with adjacent area comprised in S.Plot No. 344). More images
N-RJ-150	Archaeological Sites and Remains	Gilund		Rajasamand	25°01′58″N 74°15′49″E	Upload Photo
N-RJ-151	Babur's Garden (Charbagh)	Dholpur (Jhor)		Dholpur	26°41′33″N 77°51′58″E	Upload Photo
N-RJ-152	Jogni-Jogna Temple	Dholpur / Sone- ka – Gurja		Dholpur		Upload Photo
N-RJ-153	Shergarh Fort	Dholpur		Dholpur	26°40′19″N 77°54′07″E	Shergarh Fort More images
N-RJ-154	Wall painting in the palaces of Maharaja Gopal Lal	Karauli		Karauli	26°29′45″N 77°01′48″E	Wall painting in the palaces of Maharaja Gopal Lal More images
N-RJ-155	Haldighati (mountain pass)	Dara		Rajsamand	24°53′06″N 73°41′38″E	Haldighati (mountain pass) More images
N-RJ-156	Badshahi Bagh	Nathdwara		Rajsamand	24°54′00″N 73°43′00″E	Upload Photo
N-RJ-157	Chetak Samadhi	Raktatalai		Rajsamand	24°53′12″N 73°41′34″E	Chetak Samadhi
N-RJ-158	Rakta Talai	Tehsil- Nathdwara		Rajsamand	24°55′12″N 73°43′14″E	Upload Photo
N-RJ-159	Ruined Palace of Maharana Pratap at Chavand	Sarada		Udaipur	24°10′39″N 73°48′40″E	Ruined Palace of Maharana Pratap at Chavand More images
N-RJ-160	Mahal known as Hawa Mahal, Veerpura (Jaisamand)	Sarada		Udaipur	24°14′19″N 73°57′13″E	Mahal known as Hawa Mahal, Veerpura (Jaisamand) More images
N-RJ-161	Roothi Rani Ka Mahal, Veerpura (Jaisamand)	Sarada		Udaipur	24°14′34″N 73°57′44″E	Roothi Rani Ka Mahal, Veerpura (Jaisamand) More images
N-RJ-162	Protection of Brahma Temple	Pushkar		Ajmer	26°29′15″N 74°32′56″E	Protection of Brahma Temple More images
N-RJ-163	Fortress known as Medhaji-ka-Mahal	Jamwa Ramgarh		Jaipur	27°01′34″N 76°00′31″E	Upload Photo

== See also ==
- List of Monuments of National Importance in India
- List of State Protected Monuments in Rajasthan
