= Gangrar railway station =

Railway station in Rajasthan, India

Gangrar

General information
- Location: Gangrar, Chittorgarh district, Rajasthan; India
- Coordinates: 25.060795°N 74.625049°E
- Elevation: 414 metres (1,358 ft)
- System: Indian Railways station
- Owner: Indian Railways
- Operator: North Western Railway
- Line: Ajmer–Ratlam line
- Platforms: 1
- Tracks: 1

Construction
- Structure type: Standard (on ground station)
- Parking: Yes

Other information
- Status: Functioning
- Station code: GGR
- Zone(s): North Western Railway
- Division(s): Ajmer
Location
- Location within India Location within Rajasthan

Gangrar railway station is a railway station in Chittorgarh district, Rajasthan. Its code is GGR. It serves Gangrar. The station consists of a single platform. Passenger, Express trains halt here.
