= Rupbas railway station =

Railway station in Rajasthan, India

Rupbas

General information
- Location: Rupbas, Bharatpur district, Rajasthan; India
- Coordinates: 26.989773°N 77.590431°E
- System: Indian Railways station
- Owner: Indian Railways
- Operator: North Central Railway
- Line: Bayana–Agra line
- Platforms: 2
- Tracks: 2

Construction
- Structure type: Standard (on ground station)
- Parking: Yes

Other information
- Status: Functioning
- Station code: RBS
- Zone(s): North Central Railway
- Division(s): Agra
Location
- Location within India Location within Rajasthan

Rupbas railway station is a railway station in Bharatpur district, Rajasthan. Its code is RBS. It serves Rupbas. The station consists of 2 platforms. Passenger, Express trains halt here.
