= Avari Mata temple =

Avari Mata
- आसवरा माता,आवरी माता
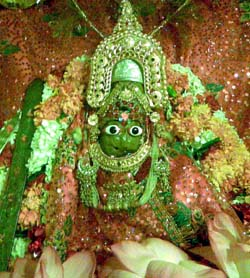

Religion
- Affiliation: Hinduism
- District: Chittorgarh
- Festivals: Navratri, Diwali

Location
- Location: Bhadesar
- State: Rajasthan
- Country: India
- Interactive map of Avari Mata
- Coordinates: 24.6286°N 74.4987°E

Architecture
- Temple: 1

Avari Mata temple (आवरी माता का मन्दिर) is in Bhadesar tehsil of Nikumbh, Chittorgarh district, Rajasthan. Located in an area with hills and springs in the village of Aasawara, Aavari Mata was born into a Rathore Rajput family, hence she is also called Rathora Rani.In Avari mata tample Traditionally, it has been visited by people seeking a cure for paralysis and polio. Avari Mata Temple is one of the popular temples in Rajasthan which is located in the Bhadesar Town of Chittorgarh. The temple is dedicated to goddess Avari Mata and the temple the Aasawara. There is a pond and Hanuman temple behind the temple.

== History ==
It is believed that the temple is having special powers to heal people and the devotees visit this temple to heal themselves from many ailments which are chronic and became incurable for years. There are many people who come with their families and stay here to get their family members cured fully and also visit the temple and enjoy the vicinity.
