= Mudipalli =

- Village
- Interactive map of Mudipalli
- Coordinates: 13°18′N 79°33′E
- Country: India
- State: Andhra Pradesh
- District: Chittor
- Mandal: Nagari

Languages
  - Official: Telugu
- Time zone: UTC+5:30 (IST)
- PIN: 517592
- Vehicle registration: AP

Mudipalli is a village in Nagari mandal, in Chittoor district of the Indian state of Andhra Pradesh.

A bas relief of Parshwanath from the 8th century were found on a nearby hill in 2016.
