= Ghateshwar Temple =

Hindu Temple in India

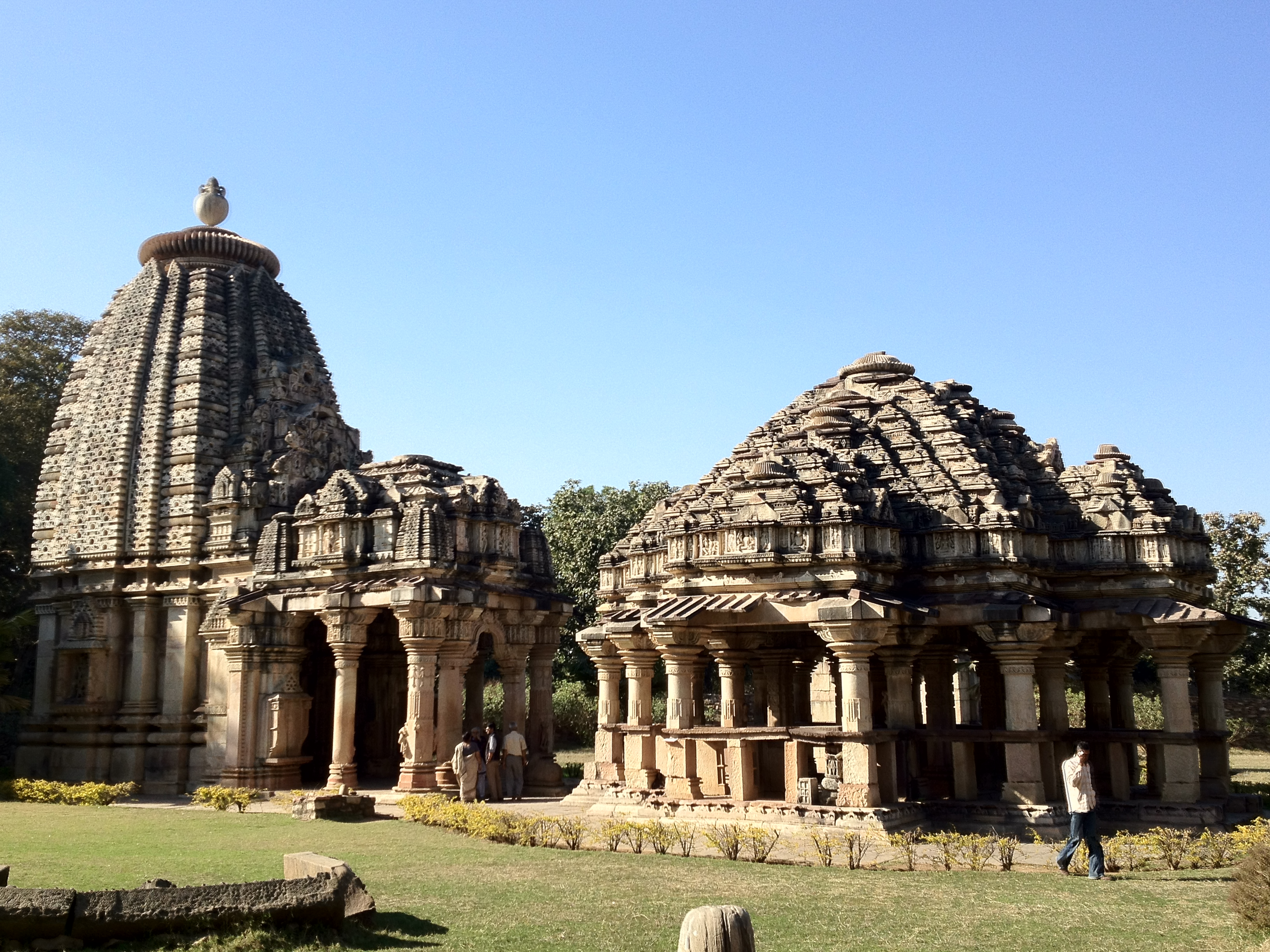
- Ghateshwara Mahadeva temple in the Baroli Temples Complex. The temples were built between the 10th and 11th centuries CE by the Gurjara-Pratihara dynasty.

- Location within Rajasthan

Religion
- Affiliation: Hinduism
- District: Rawatbhata town, Chittorgarh district
- Deity: Shiva

Location
- Location: Baroli
- State: Rajasthan
- Country: India
- Interactive map of Ghateshwar Temple
- Coordinates: 24°57′29″N 75°35′37″E

Architecture
- Type: Gurjara-Pratihara
- Completed: 10th century

Ghateshwar Temple is a Hindu temple located in Badoli (also spelled Baroli), one of the nine temples near the river Chambal in Rajasthan, India. The Ghateshwar temple is dedicated to the god Shiva and is constructed in the Pratihara style of circa. It is located in Rawatbhata, which is around 50 km from Kota. The Ghateshwar temple is governed by the Archaeological Survey of India.

== Architecture ==
Believed to have been built in the tenth century, the massive structure consists of a pancharatha sanctum, antarala and mukha mandapa, which rest on six pillars. The entrance is through a makara-torana. There are surasundaris which are carved on the front pillars of mukha mandapa in dance postures.

== See also ==
- Baroli Temples
