= Badoli =

Village in India

Coordinates: 28.080°N 77.435°E

Badoli is a village in Faridabad district of Haryana, India. The village is bordered by the Agra canal in the east, Bhatola in the west, Budhena in the north and NTPC plant in the south. The main source of income is milk production followed by agriculture, farming and civil services.

== See also ==
- Baroli temples, Rajasthan
- Divisions of Haryana
