= Baroli Temples =

Baroli Temples Complex
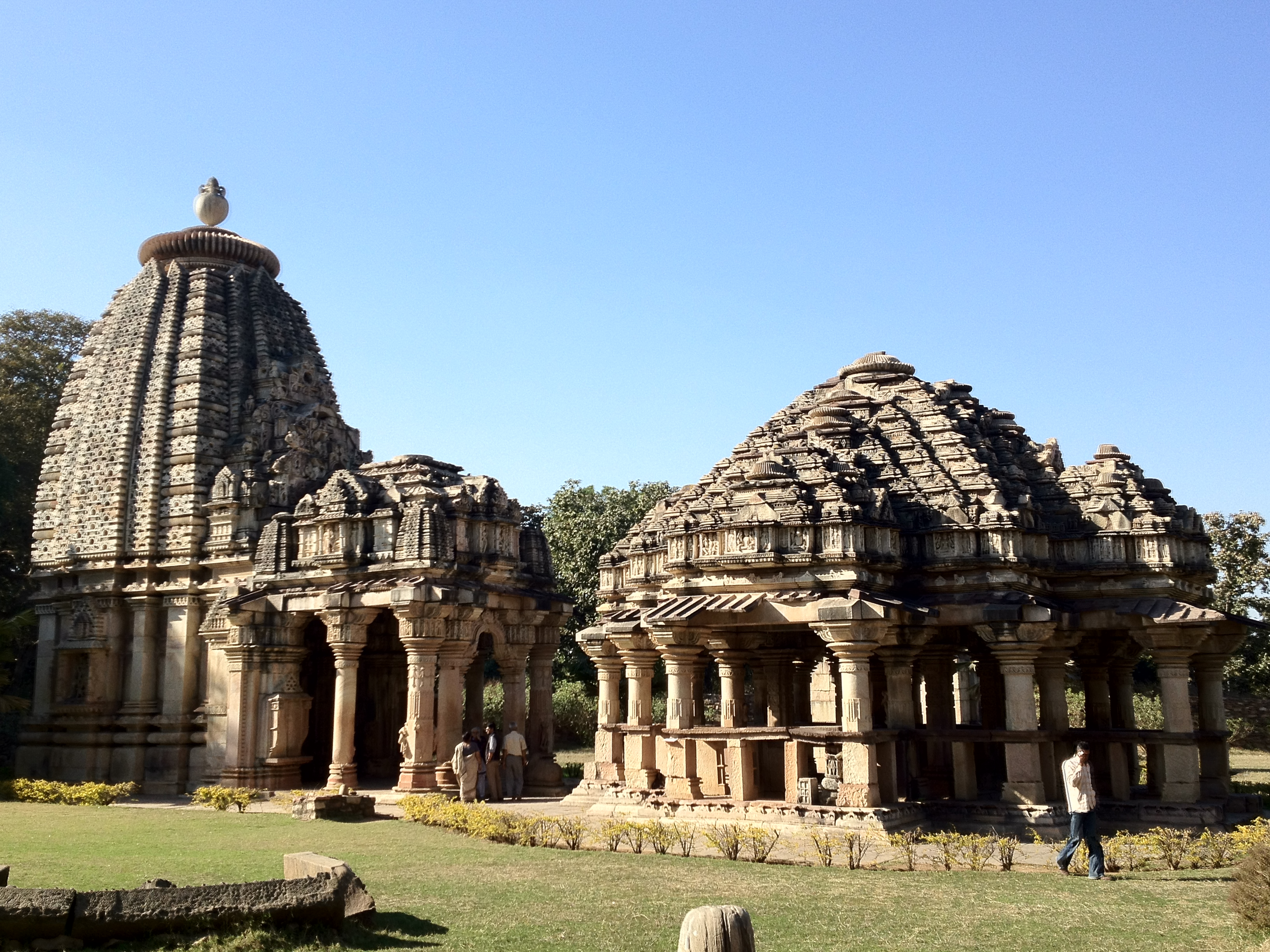
- Ghateshwara Mahadeva temple, Baroli Temples Complex

- Location within Rajasthan

Religion
- Affiliation: Hinduism
- District: Rawatbhata town, Chittorgarh district
- Deity: Shiva

Location
- Location: Baroli
- State: Rajasthan
- Country: India
- Interactive map of Baroli Temples Complex
- Coordinates: 24°57′29″N 75°35′37″E

Architecture
- Type: Gurjara-Pratihara
- Completed: 10th century

The Baroli Temples Complex, also known as the Badoli temples, is located in Baroli village in Rawatbhata City in Chittorgarh district of Rajasthan, India. The complex of eight temples is situated within a walled enclosure; an additional temple is about 1 kilometre (0.62 mi) away. They are built in the Gurjara Pratihara style of temple architecture dated to the tenth century CE and today show various degree of preservation, decay and destruction. All nine temples are under the control of the Archaeological Survey of India for conservation and protection. A well known art critic characterised "the creations of Badoli as the most perfect of their age that he had encountered within that part of the country and, in their own peculiar style."

== Location ==
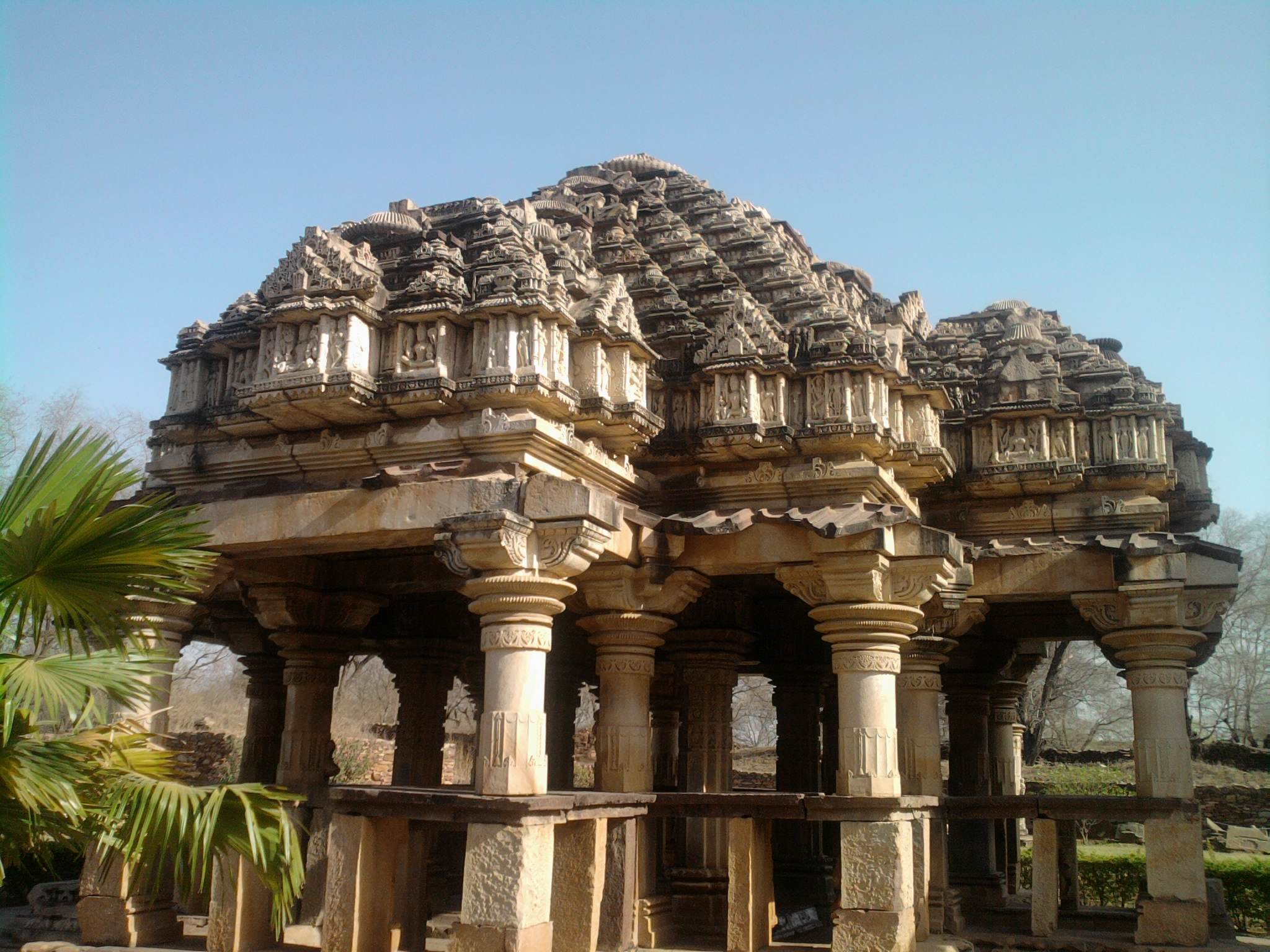
Sringar Chauri of the 10th-century Ghateshwara Mahadeva Temple

The Baroli Temples Complex is located in Baroli village in Rawatbhata City in Chittorgarh district in Rajasthan, India. The complex is located close to the rocky bank of the Chambal River, 45 kilometres (28 mi) south east of Kota, on the outer limits of Rawatbhata City. Set around a natural fountain, they are positioned in two zones in the midst of a forest containing peepal, kadamba, mango, and jamun trees.

== History ==
Though the history of the Baroli Temples is not very clear, they are reported to have been built during the Gurjara-Pratihara Empire in the 10th–11th centuries. They are one of the earliest temple complexes in Rajasthan. A carved stone image of the god Nataraja was stolen from the Baroli temple complex in 1998. It has been traced to a private collector in London. However, the statue has now been recovered.

== Features ==
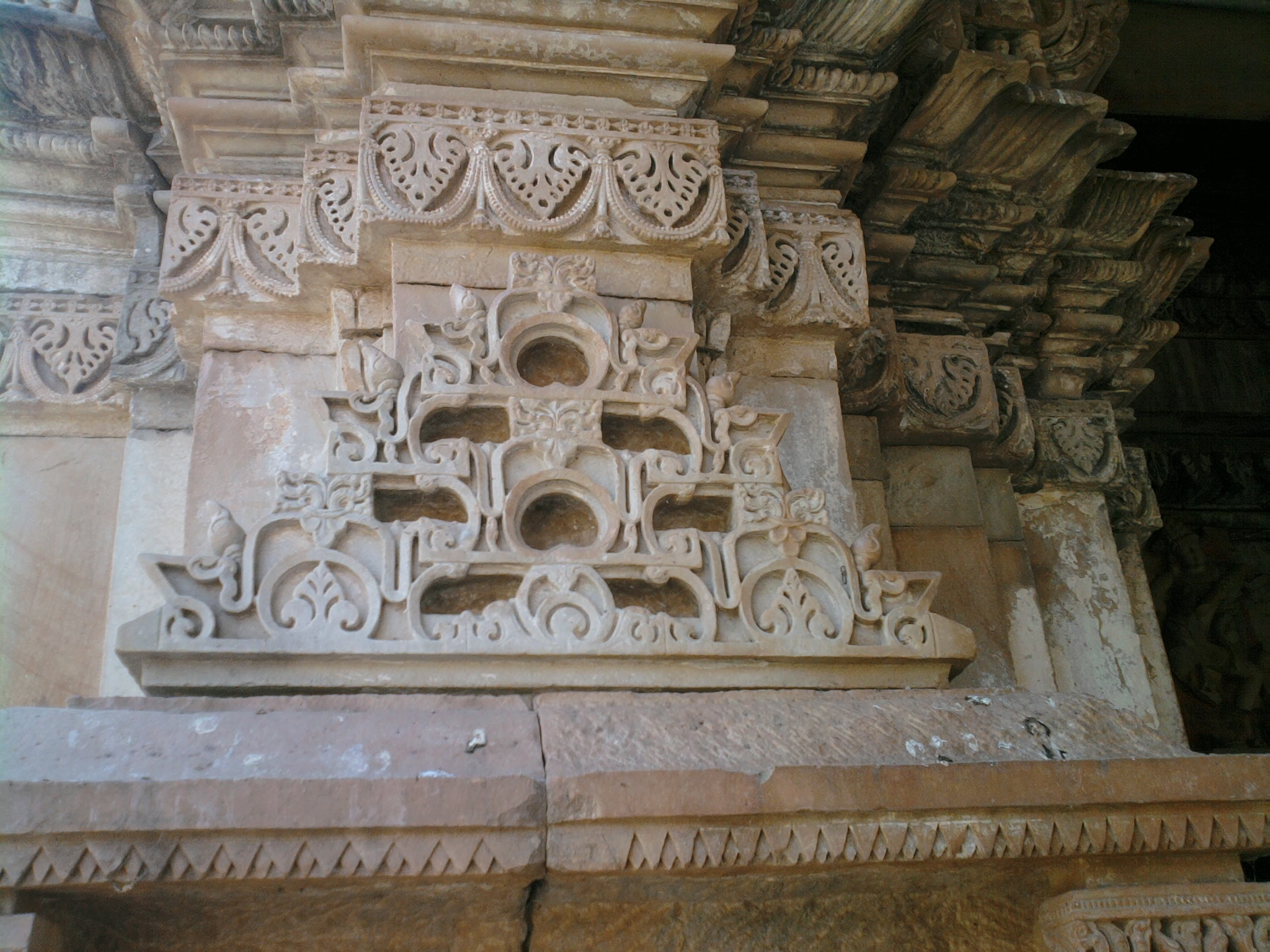
A typical architectural feature in the temples of the complex

The 10th-century Baroli Temples are of great architectural interest, consisting of temple structures built in the Gurjara-Pratihara architectural style, with exquisitely carved stonework. They are in differing stages of upkeep, with some in a semi-ruined state.

There are 8 major temples in Baroli and a ninth about one kilometre away. Four temples are dedicated to Shiva (including Ghateshwara Mahadeva Temple), two to Durga and one each to Shiva-Trimurti, Vishnu and Ganesha.

The Nataraja (Natesha) images carved in these temples are similar to those seen at Upramala. The sculpture has 16 arms and its headdress is matted. There is a large diadem carved at the centre top of the skull, which is "garnished with beaded swags." The facial features are very fine, with high arched brows and full mouth.

== Temples ==
=== Ghateshwara Mahadeva temple ===
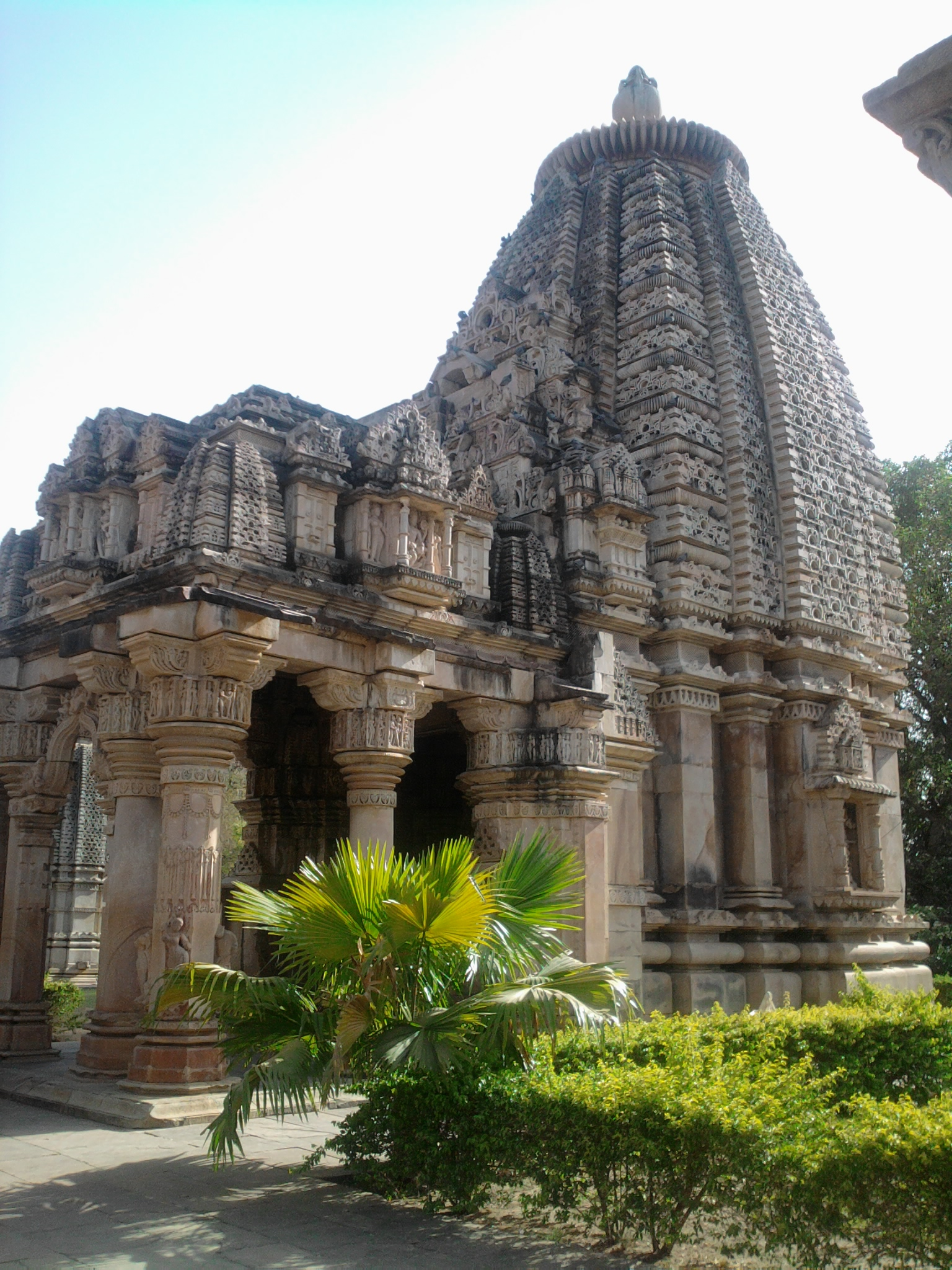
Ghateshwara Mahadeva temple

The Ghateshwara Mahadeva temple is the most prominent and the largest in the complex. The main temple structure comprises the sanctum (garbhagriha) and the mukhamandapa, a front mandapa or hall. Dated to the early 10th century, it is an intact structure that has the god Shiva depicted in the form of five lingas. One linga appears like an inverted ghata or pot, and hence the name was given to the temple of "Ghateshwara" (pot-Lord), while "Mahadeva" is a term for Shiva. The sanctum has a ceiling in the form of a large blossoming lotus. The temple has a finely carved shikara(pinnacle) above the sanctum. The superstructure has been described as a latina and the pinnacle is a phamsana. The entire superstructure is supported by six pillars and two pilasters. The pilasters, which are part of the sanctum wall, project from the wallby two-thirds of its width, and have niches encased with sculptures.

The mukhamandapa serves as a pillared entrance that leads to the sanctum. Shiva's mount Nandi (the bull) is installed between the mukhamandapa and the sanctum. The niches inside the temple are decorated with elegantly carved images of Andhakantaka (shiva slaying the demon Andhaka), Nataraja (Shiva as the Lord of dance) and the goddess Chamunda; similar images are also carved on the lintel above the entrance door. The mukhamandapa also has many carved images of semi-clad, dancing apsaras (heavenly nymphs). The ceiling is decorated with concentric forms with coiffured cusps.

The Sringar Chauri or rangamandapa (the hall of dance) is a later addition to the temple, situated just outside it. The large pillared hall is built over a raised platform called a pitha, which has decorative carvings. The transepts of the hall have co-axial entrances, both on the east and the west, ensconced in kakshasana balustrades. The four central pillars supporting the hall are very well ornamented. The images include the river goddesses Ganga and Yamuna as dwarapalas (door-keepers), the trinity images of Brahma-Vishnu-Shiva, and several depictions of Shiva in his different incarnations. Twenty pillars around the perimeter of the hall are simple in design.

There is a sacred tank next to the temple which has a tiered approach leading to the edge of the water.

=== Ganesha temple ===
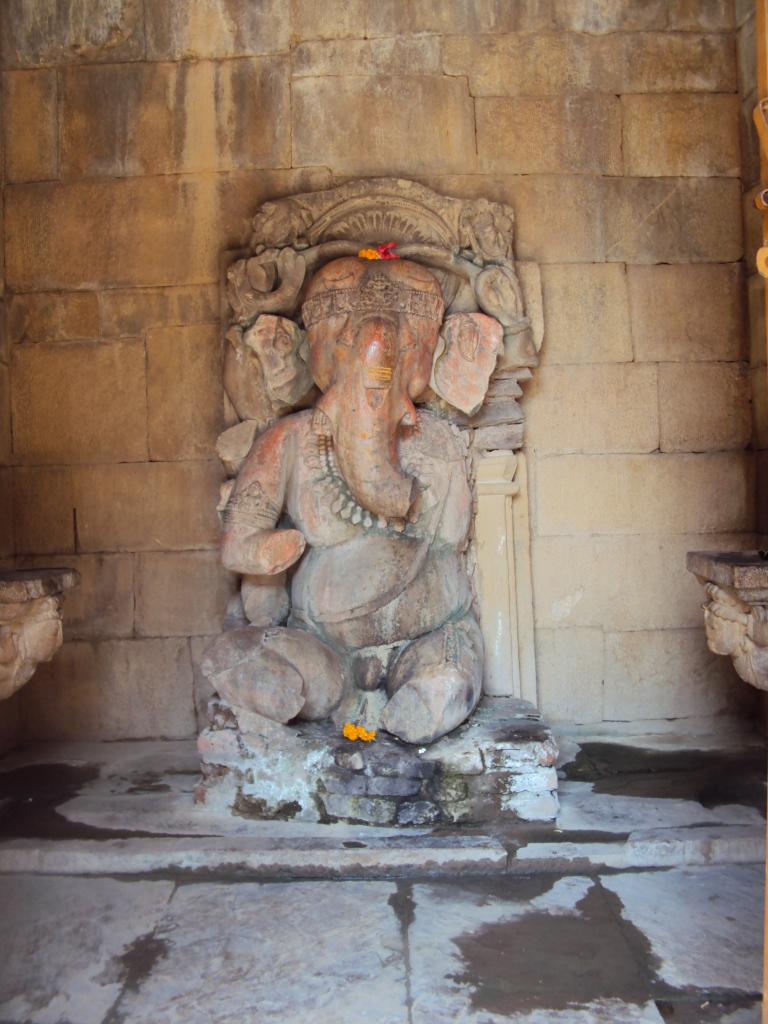
Temple of Ganesha

Dedicated to Ganesha, the elephant-headed god of wisdom, this temple faces east. While the main temple structure is built of stones, the superstructure of the shikara is brick. Dated to the 10th century, the shrine has a projecting vestibule and an atiratha sanctum. The door is without any decorations. The arms and feet of the image of Ganesha have been cut off, possibly by invading Islamic armies.

=== Shiva temple in the temple tank ===
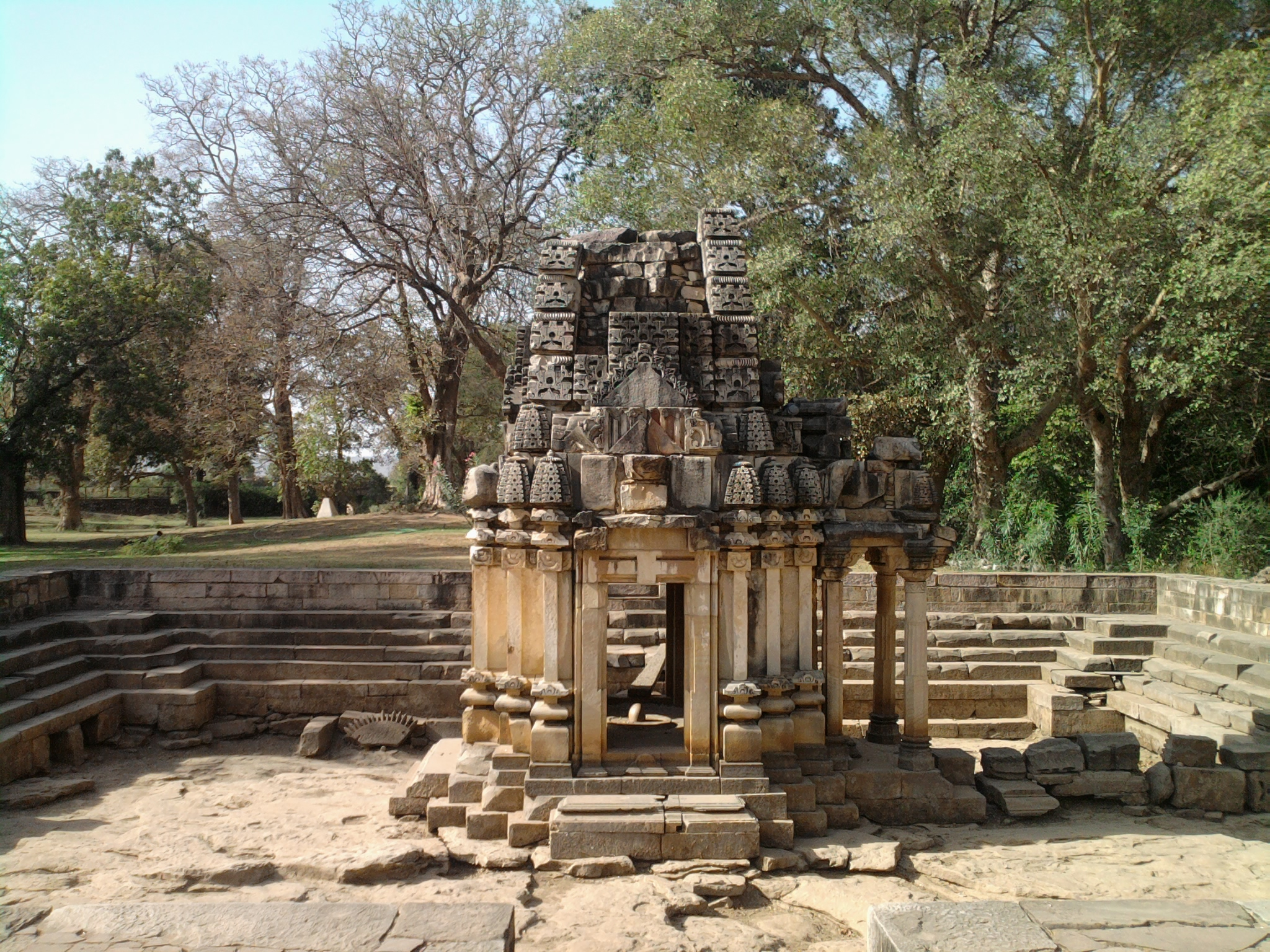
Shiva temple in the tank

This Shiva temple, also dated to the 10th century, has a sanctum with the divine linga in the middle of the sacred tank. Built in the Pancharatha style, it faces east. The portico in front of the sanctum is a single bay built with pillars.

=== Vamanavatar temple ===
The 10th-century Vamanavatar temple is a small shrine dedicated to a four-armed image of Vamana, the fifth avatar of the god Vishnu. The sanctum is covered with a flat slab as a ceiling. While a vestibule and an entrance are extant, the pinnacle is missing.

=== Trimurti temple ===
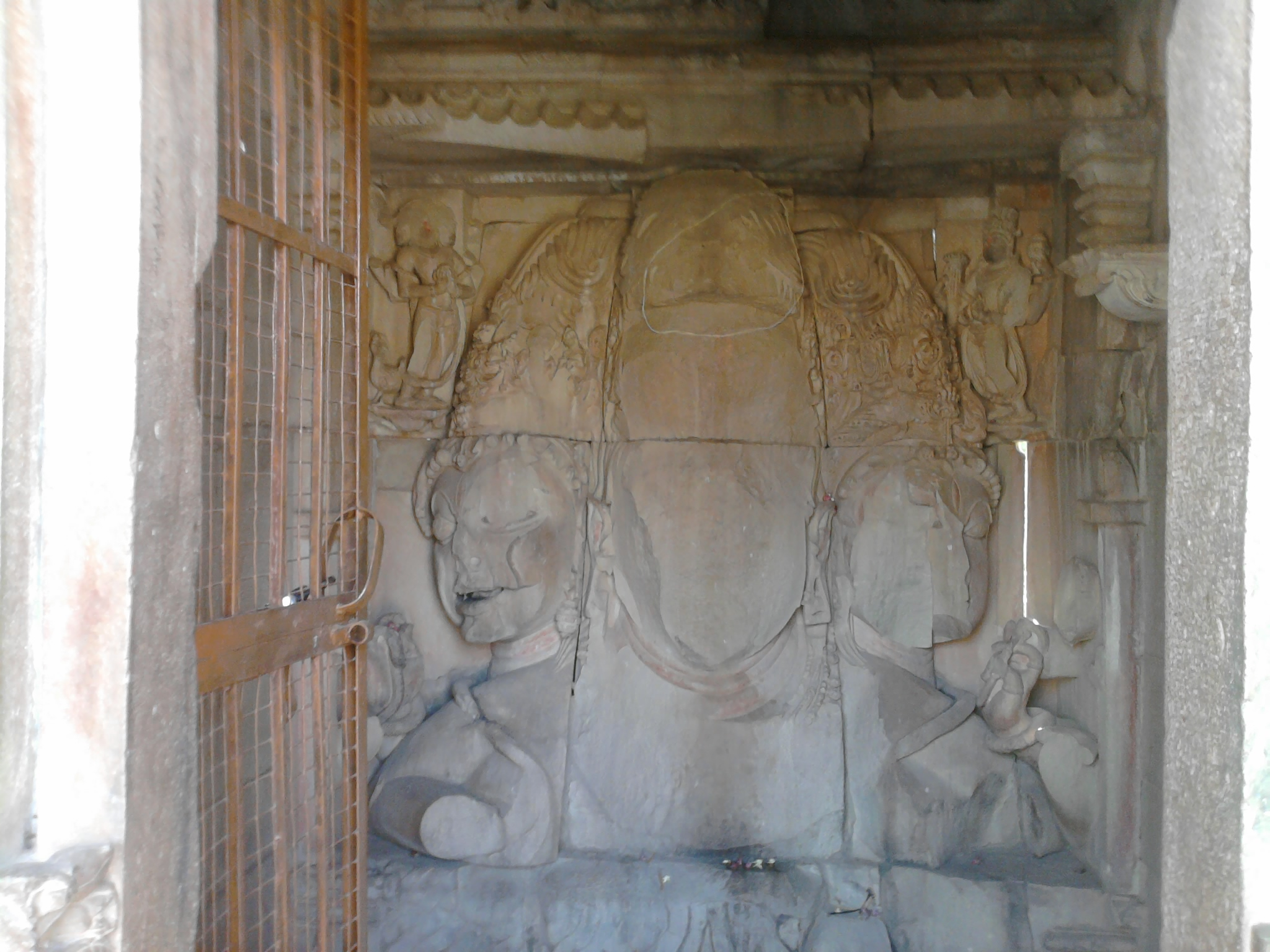
Defaced Trimurti Shiva

The Trimurti temple, dated to the 10th century, is partially damaged. It is situated in the south east of the temple complex. The extant structures, in the Gujara-Pratihara style of architecture, consist of a pancharatha-style sanctum topped with an elegant shikhara in Nagara architectural style, and also a vestibule. However, the mukhamandapa has been damaged. The lintel of the entrance of the sanctum has Nataraja as the lalatabimba (central protective image). The sanctum is deified with a Trimurti-Shiva (triple headed Shiva) or Mahesha-murti, which is defaced.

=== Ashtamata temple ===
The Ashtamata temple, also known as the Mahishamardini temple, is located to the south of the Ghatesvara Mahadeva temple. The east-facing shrine was also built in the 10th century in the Pratihara architectural style. The temple, built in stone, consists of the sanctum, antarala (secondary chamber) and a mukhamandapa. The Pancharatha-style sanctum is topped by the ten-tiered shikhara, built in the Nagara style, separated by bhumi-amalakas, amalakas (crowns) separating the tiers (bhumi). The entrance door to the sanctum has three panels (tri-sakha). A dancing Maheshvari is carved on the lintel as the Lalatabimba. A carved Parvati image occupies the central niche in the sukanasa (portion of the pinnacle over the portico). These features of the temple support the conjecture that the temple is dedicated to the goddess Durga (Mahishamardini).

=== Sheshashyan temple ===
The Sheshashyan temple is a stone temple which is damaged. It was built in the 10th century in the Parihara style of architecture. Its existing feature consists of a sanctum in rectangular plan with projecting vestibule. The sanctum was probably topped by a Valabhi (wagon vault), now missing. The entrance to the sanctum does not have any decorations.

== See also ==
- Badoli
- East Rajasthan Uplands, Baroli temples are located in this region

== Bibliography ==
- Lindsay Brown; Amelia Thomas (2008). Rajasthan, Delhi & Agra. Lonely Planet. pp. 232–. ISBN 978-1-74104-690-8.
