= Bijai Garh =

Fort in Bharatpur, Rajasthan, India

Coordinates: 26.88665°N 77.23678°E

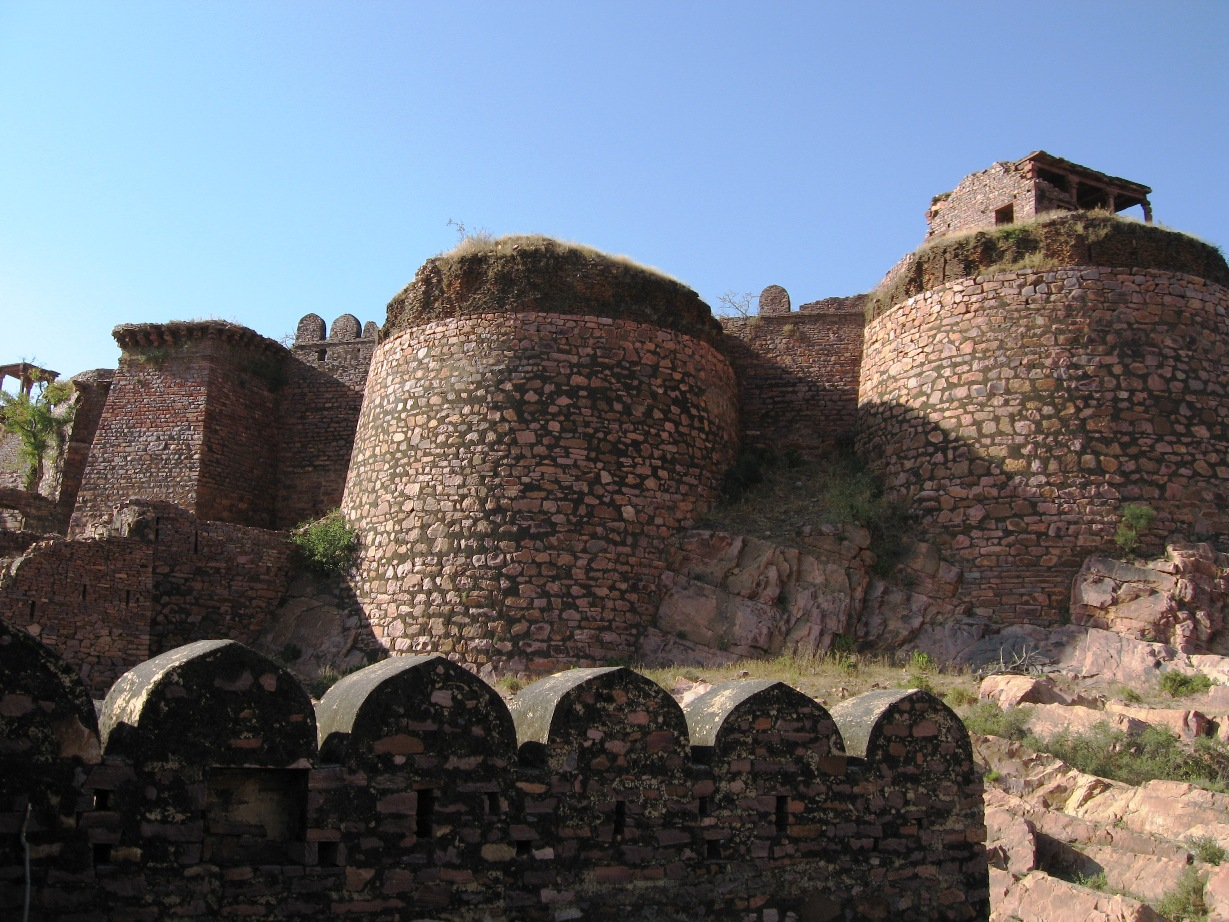
- External wall of Bijai Garh

Site information
- Type: Fort
- Controlled by: king Vijayapala

Site history
- Built: 1040 CE
- In use: Historic

Bijai Garh, also known as Vijayamandirgarh or Bijaigarh, is a fort located in Bharatpur district. It is situated on Damdama Hill, an extension of the Aravalli Range and overlooking the town of Bayana. The fort was built by the Jadaun Rajput ruler Bijai Pal in the 11th century, and came under the control of various rulers over the centuries. It was captured by Ghaznavid and Ghurid armies, later by Delhi Sultanate and Mughal rulers, and mentioned by Babur and Akbar in their chronicles. The fort's enclosure contains ancient temple ruins, medieval gateways, and notable artifacts such as a Gupta-period inscribed pillar. Bijaigarh contains several old temples and red stones pillars bearing an Inscription of Vishnuvardhan Feudatory of Samudragupta.

Today the site and several its adjacent monuments are protected by the Archaeological Survey of India (ASI) as a Monuments of National Importance. It is approximately 25 km from the nearest city, Hindaun.

== History ==
According to the 1043 CE Bayana inscription of king Vijaypala (Bijai Pal), he built the fort of Bijaigarh, also known as Vijayagarh of Vijay-Mandir-garh, at Shripat (Bayana) around 1040-1041 CE. He bore the title Parama-bhattaraka, and belonged to the Yaduvanshi Jadaun clan of Rajputs.

Traditional genealogies cite that Bijai Pal as a 88th descendant of the Lord Krishna. The fort (also called Vijayamandir Garh, meaning "Mandir of Victory") was built on a rocky eminence 2 miles southwest of the town center, dominating the plains.

Bijai Pal’s own reign ended after battle with Masʿūd (Salar), a nephew of Mahmud of Ghazni, around the middle of the 11th century. Masʿūd’s forces briefly took Bayana, but local Rajputs soon recaptured the hill fort.

In 1047, the Ghurid general Abu Bakr of Kandahar took control over the fort. Abu Bakr established his tomb in the vicinity of Bayana. Later the fort falls under the dynasties which ruled Delhi. In 1196 CE, the fort and Bayana surrendered to Muhammad of Ghor during his conquest of northern India. Subsequently it remained a strategic outpost of the Delhi Sultanate. Sikandar Lodi captured Bayana in 1492, and in 1526 Babur reported it as "one of the most famous forts in India". His son Humayun took the fort from the Lodi governor in 1535. The Mughal-era chronicles (Ain-i-Akbari) note that Bayana was once the capital of a province and that the fort contained many buildings, underground chambers and a tall tower. In Akbar's reign Bayana served as a regional military station and prison, but by the late 16th century it was reduced to a pargana (subdivision) under Agra, and its importance declined. Under subsequent states (Sur, Maratha, Bharatpur Jat), the fort remained occupied or garrisoned intermittently, but no major new construction is recorded.

== Architecture ==
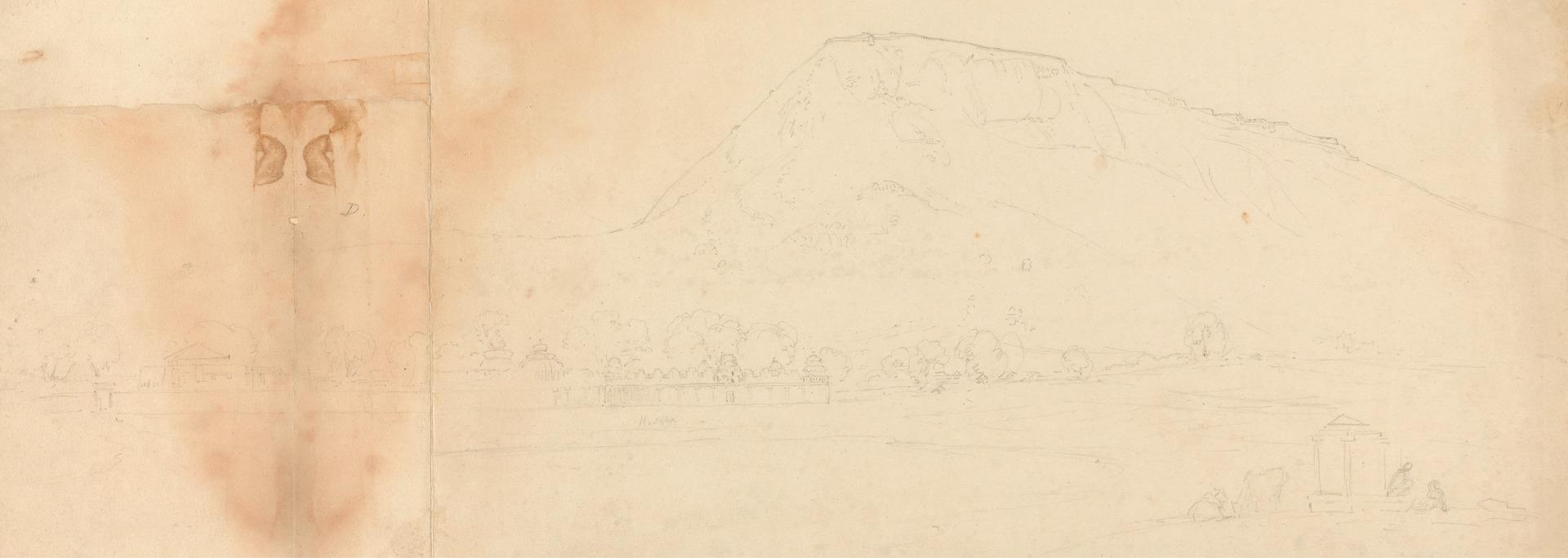
Illustration of Bijai Garh by Thomas Daniell

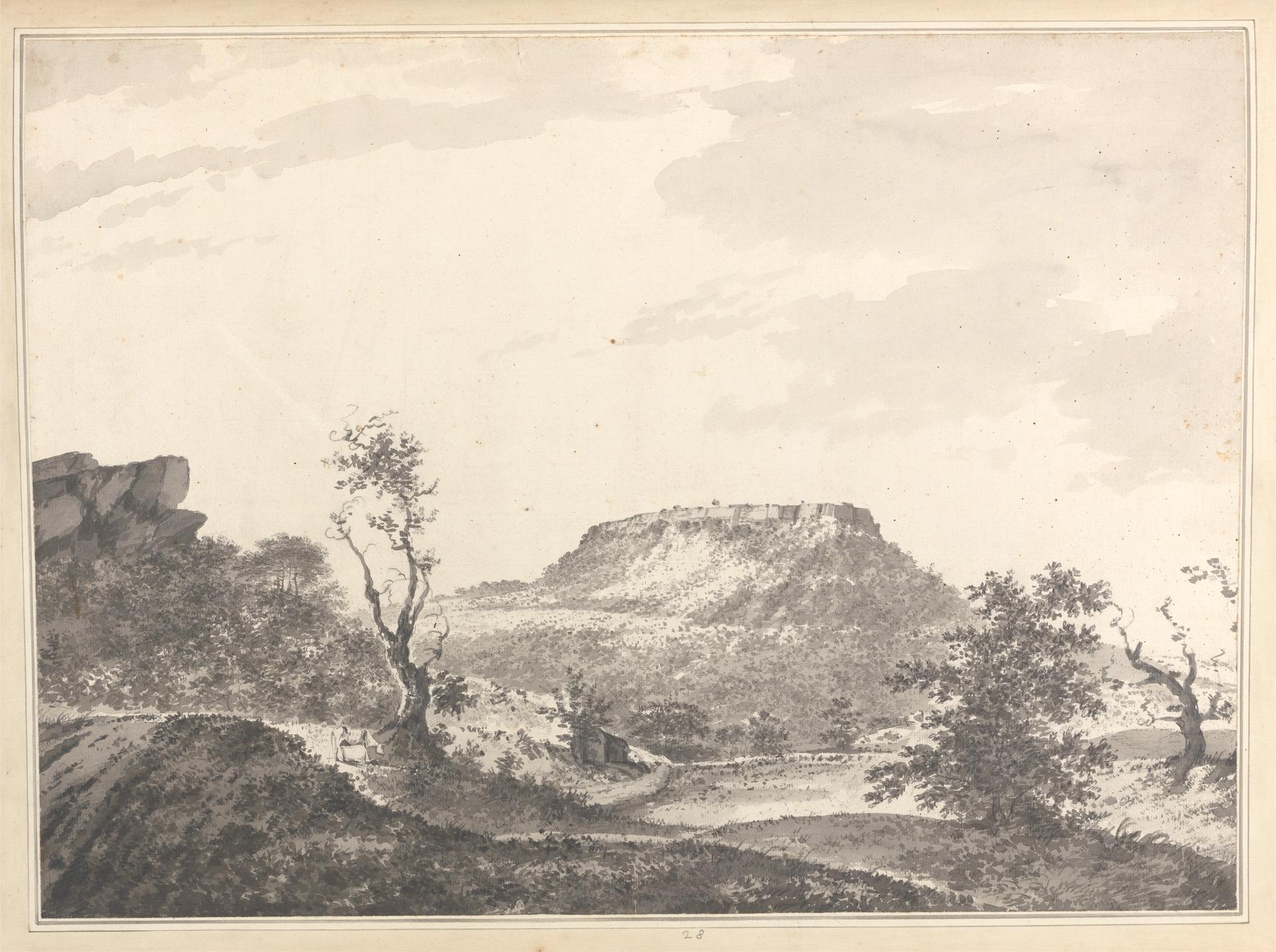
Illustration of Bijai Garh by William Hodges

Bijai Garh is a hill fort of medieval Rajput architecture, built in reddish local stone atop Damdama Hill. Its fortified enclosure wall is continuous on all sides of the summit, taking advantage of the steep rocky slopes. The stone walls run without a break all around the fort perimeter. The main entrance (on the south side) is approached by a long flight of stairs through a sequence of gateways. These gates are functional rather than an ornate, reflecting the fort's martial purpose. Interiors of the courtyard are irregular and rugged. Much of the ground is with natural boulders and thorny vegetation. Two small red‐sandstone palaces or halls stand near the center, they retain fragmentary carved brackets and faint traces of painted decoration on the walls. A ruined "Bhagirath pavilion" (pillared hall) in the inner citadel is attributed to Humayun's paymaster. According to tradition, this pavilion is among the oldest intact Mughal-period residences, as it is said to have inspired the later Panch Mahal at Fatehpur Sikri. Two free-standing monuments still rise from the ruins. One is a tall octagonal tower bearing a Quranic inscription. The other is the Bhimlat pillar, a famous red‐sandstone column set on a precipitous cliff-edge. The Bhimlat pillar carries a Sanskrit inscription in Gupta Brahmi dating to the 4th century CE, when the hill was in the domain of the ancient Avanti/Vatika king Vishnuvardhana. It was evidently a religious (sacrificial) pillar of long antiquity, very likely reused as a symbol of sacred geography.

Parts of two ruined Hindu temples (rebuilt as mosques in the Mughal period) still stand, one with a fragmentary Sanskrit inscription dated 1043 AD. Within the walls are cisterns and tanks for collecting rainwater, and remnants of a stepwell. The Bijai Garh's architecture is functional and fortress-like, with only hints of ornament like, carved pillars, faint frescoes on palace walls, and the inscriptions on its tower and ancient pillar. Its red sandstone walls and gateways, set against the rough stone of the hill, give it an austere grandeur, one that impressed even Babur as "formidable" and "among the finest forts in India".

== Cultural significance ==
Bijai Garh (Bayana Fort) is a site of both historical and cultural importance. In medieval times it was noted in Mughal sources for its strategic role and as the center of a frontier province. Babur's chronicle praises its fame, and the Ain-i-Akbari records Bayana's agricultural products like mangoes, sugar, indigo and describes the fort's grand scale. Today the fort complex (including its gates, domed tombs, and mosques) is formally protected by the Archaeological Survey of India. An official ASI list (Jaipur Circle) identifies "Bijai Garh/Bayana Fort and its monuments", notably the Brahmabad Idgah, Islam Shah's Gate, and Jahangir's Gateway, as centrally Protected Monuments of India.

== Restoration ==
Bijai Garh is a protected heritage site administered by the Archaeological Survey of India. It is listed as Monument of National Importance (ASI monument number N-RJ-120). Public access is permitted and the fort can be visited by tourists and pilgrims. Travelers typically reach Bayana by road (it lies about 45 km from Bharatpur and 110 km from Agra).

Bijai Garh has seen limited restoration and conservation efforts in the modern period. For much of the 20th century the ASI's routine maintenance was minimal, and vegetation gradually overtook parts of the site. In recent years, however, the ASI Jaipur Circle has initiated focused projects to stabilize and restore key sections of the fort complex. In 2024, conservation works at Bayana Fort were started, example, restoration of the collapsed walls near Gate Nos. 5 and 6, conservation of the southern perimeter walls, and repair of internal structures. A separate ASI project calls for restoring the adjacent Usha Mandir and its associated mosque.
