= Badshahi Haveli =

Coordinates: 26°27′41.0″N 74°37′52.4″E

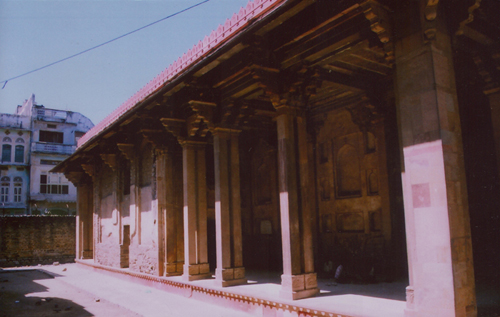
- Badsahi haveli

General information
- Location: Naya Bazar, Ajmer, India

Badshahi Haveli is an historic building in Naya Bazar, Ajmer in India.

It was built in 1567 on the order of Emperor Akbar. Rectangular in shape, the building has a pillared hall inside. The Haveli has rooms on all the four corners and can be entered via the eastern verandah. The Haveli was used by one of the Amirs of Akbar as a residence later.
