= Jagat Shiromani Temple, Amer =

Hindu temple in Amer, Rajasthan dedicated to Krishna and Meera Bai

Jagat Shiromani Temple
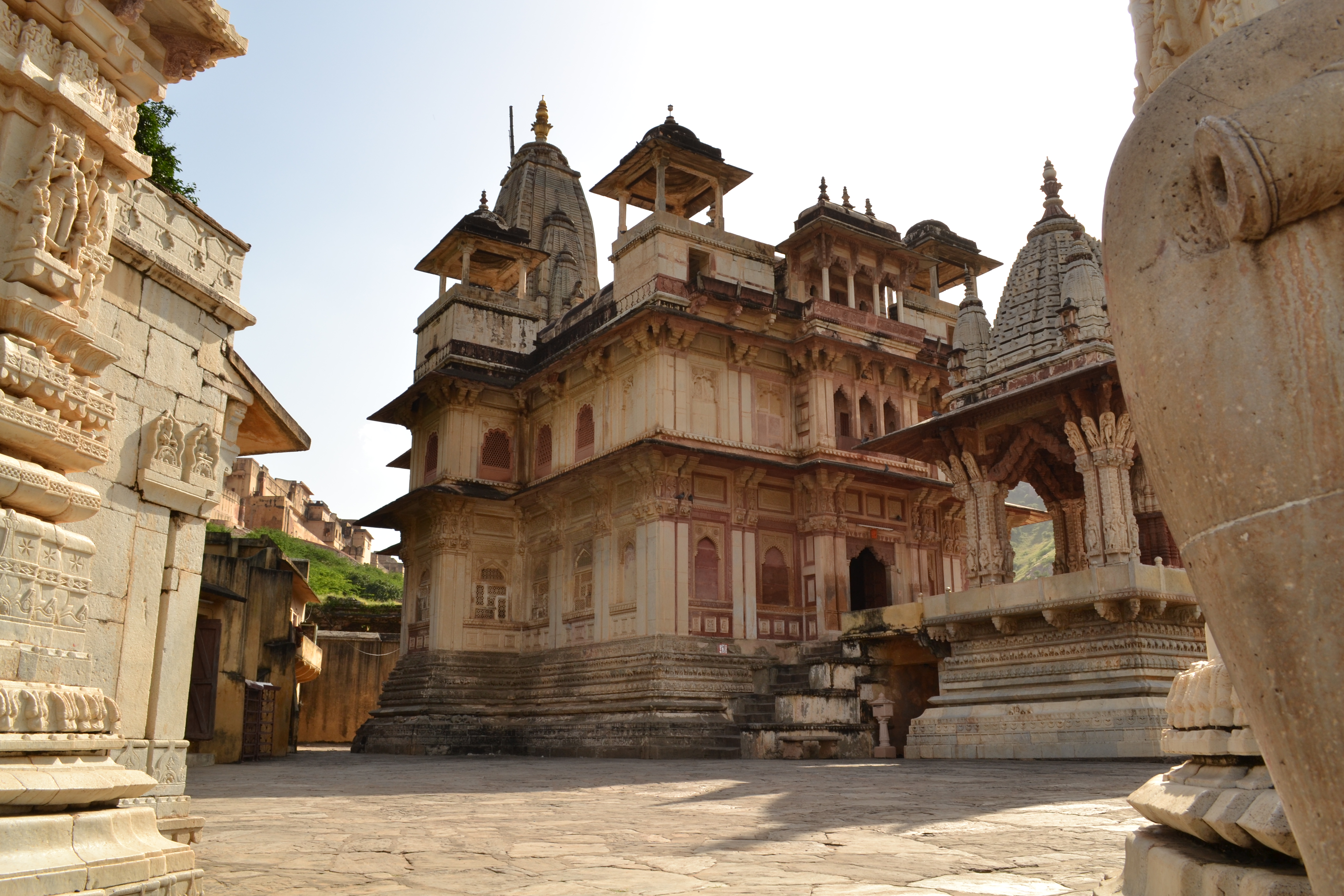
- Outer view of Jagat Shiromani Temple

- Location in Rajasthan, India Jagat Shiromani Temple, Amer (India)

Religion
- Affiliation: Hinduism
- Deity: Krishna, Meera Bai, Vishnu

Location
- Location: Amer, Jaipur district
- State: Rajasthan
- Country: India
- Coordinates: 26.99127°N 75.85083°E

Architecture
- Creator: Queen Kanakwati
- Completed: 1608

Website
- https://www.jagatshiromaniji.com

Jagat Shiromani Temple is a 17th-century Hindu temple situated in the town of Amer, near Jaipur in the Indian state of Rajasthan. The temple is unique for being dedicated to Lord Krishna, Meera Bai, and Vishnu. It is one of the few temples in India where Meera Bai, the poet-saint of the Bhakti movement, is enshrined alongside Lord Krishna.

== History ==
The temple was commissioned by Queen Kanakwati, the wife of King Man Singh I of the Kachwaha dynasty, between 1599 and 1608 CE. It was built in memory of their son Jagat Singh, who died young.

According to local tradition, the temple houses the same idol of Krishna that Meera Bai worshipped in Mewar. When threats from Mughal forces loomed, the idol was relocated to Amer for its safety and later consecrated in this temple.

== Architecture ==
The temple’s architecture reflects a blend of North Indian (Nagara) style and elements of Mughal influence. It is constructed primarily from locally quarried sandstone and marble. The sanctum features elaborately carved pillars, domes, and a garbhagriha (inner sanctum) where the idols of Krishna and Meera Bai are housed.

Intricate carvings of Hindu deities, mythological figures, musicians, and floral motifs adorn the walls and ceilings of the temple, signifying the high craftsmanship of the era.

== Religious significance ==
The temple holds an important place in the Bhakti movement's legacy and is visited by followers of Meera Bai, Krishna devotees, and cultural historians. Scholars have noted it as a rare physical symbol of the spiritual union between Meera and Krishna.

It is also a site of cultural interest during festivals like Janmashtami, where devotees gather in large numbers for special darshan and bhajans dedicated to Krishna and Meera.

== Gallery ==
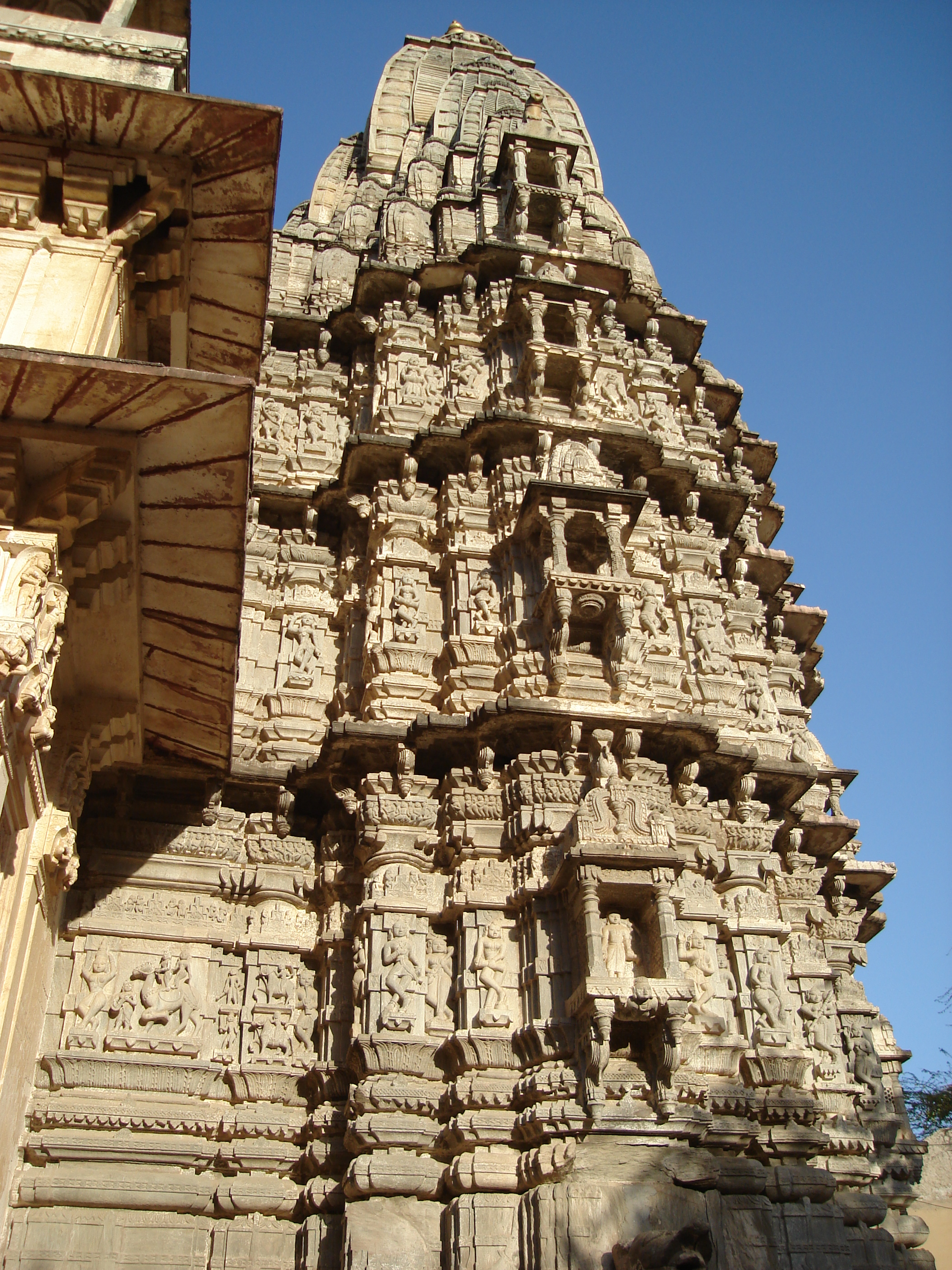
Outer view of the Jagat Shiromani Temple

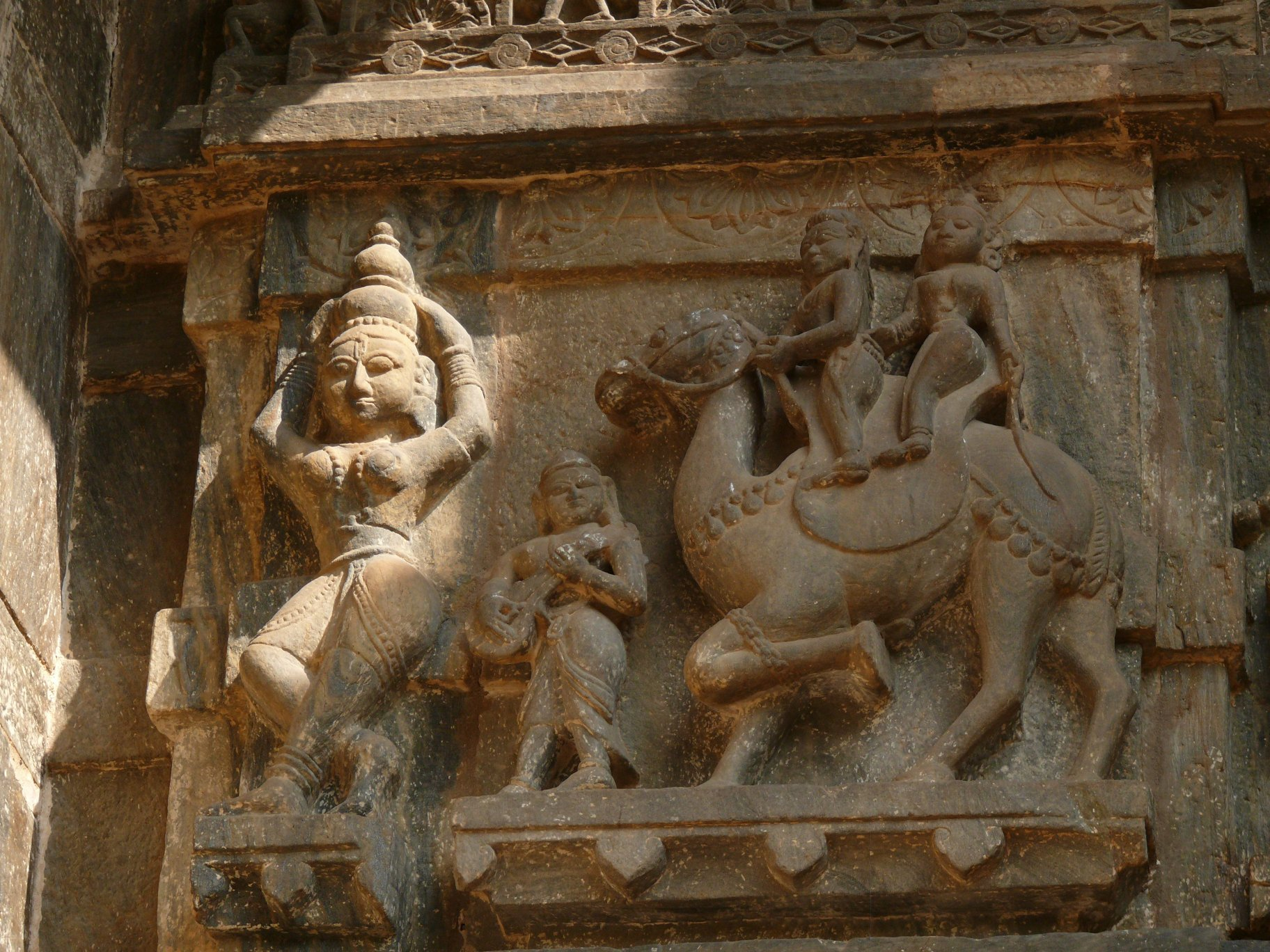
Sculptures of musicians and women at the temple entrance

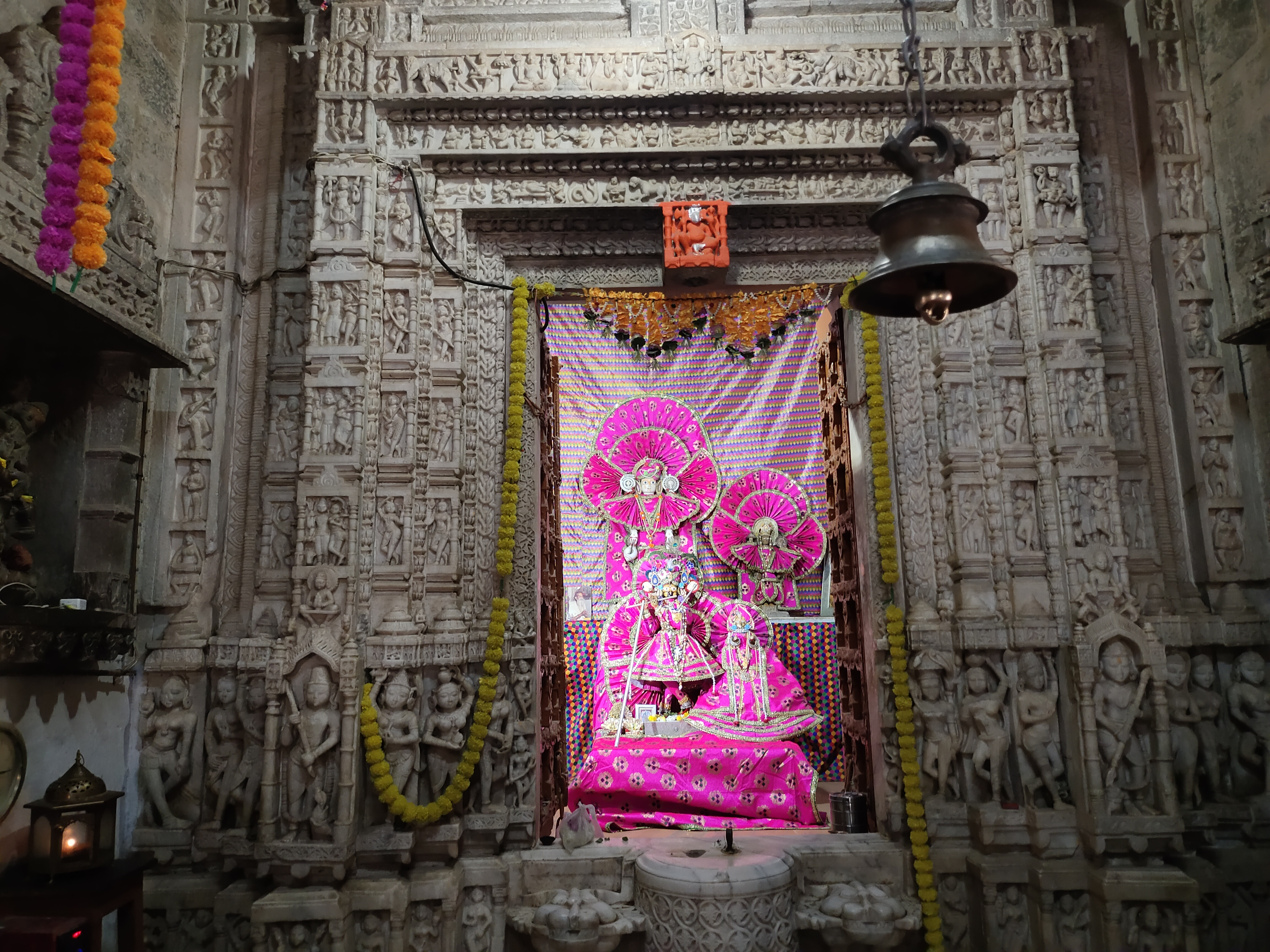
Close-up of sculpted panel at the entrance

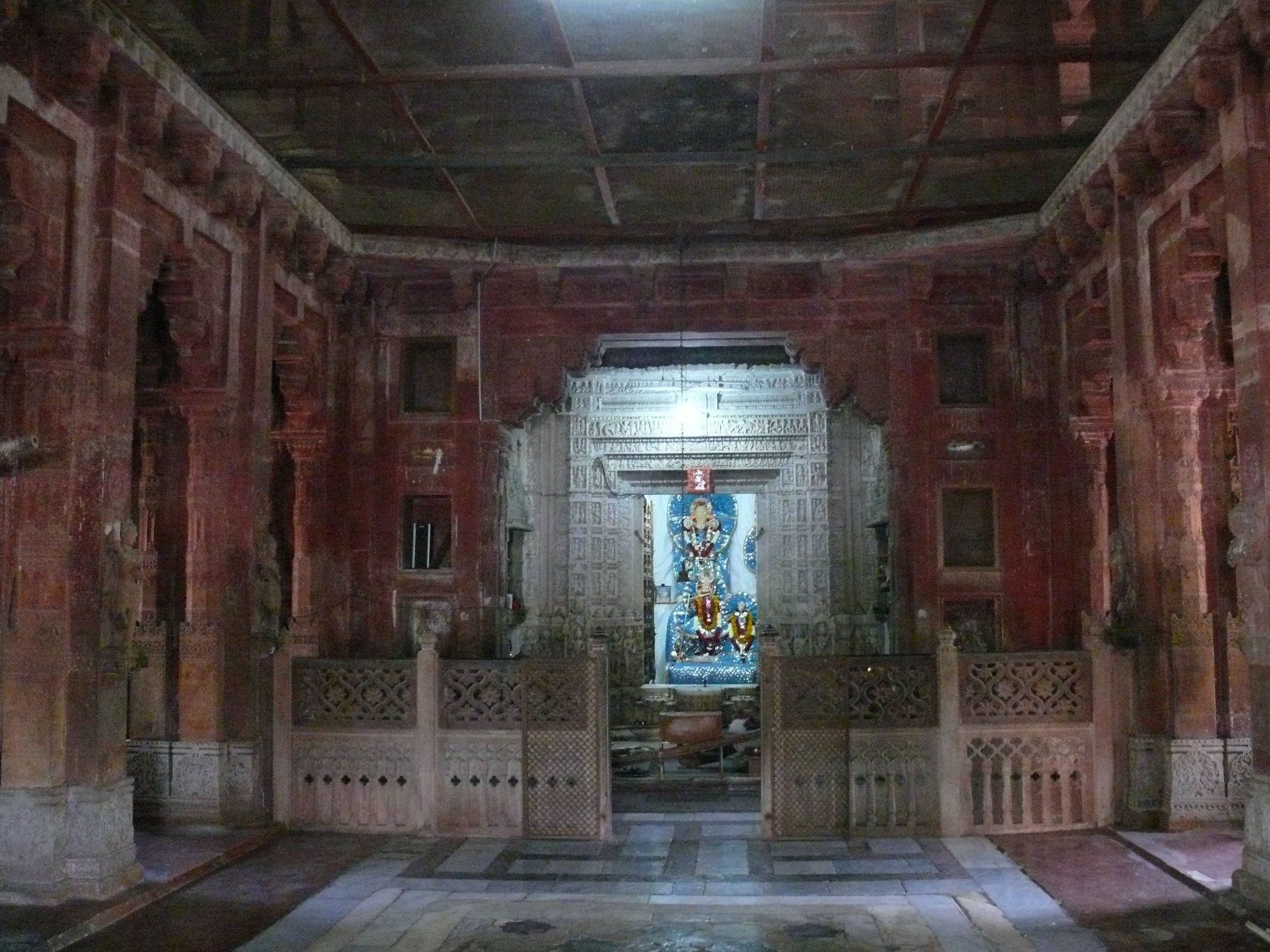
Intricate carvings on the temple façade

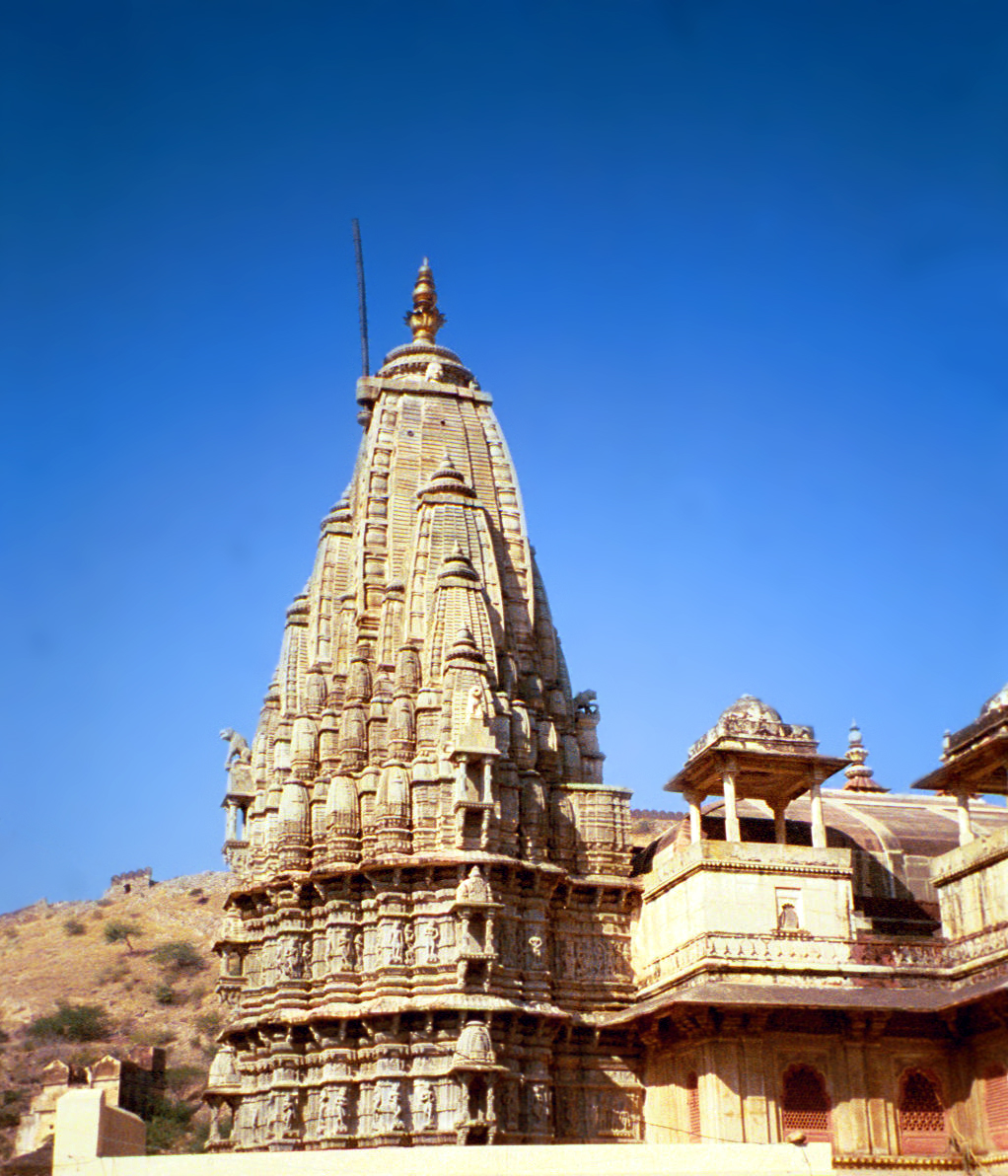
Temple complex from the side angle

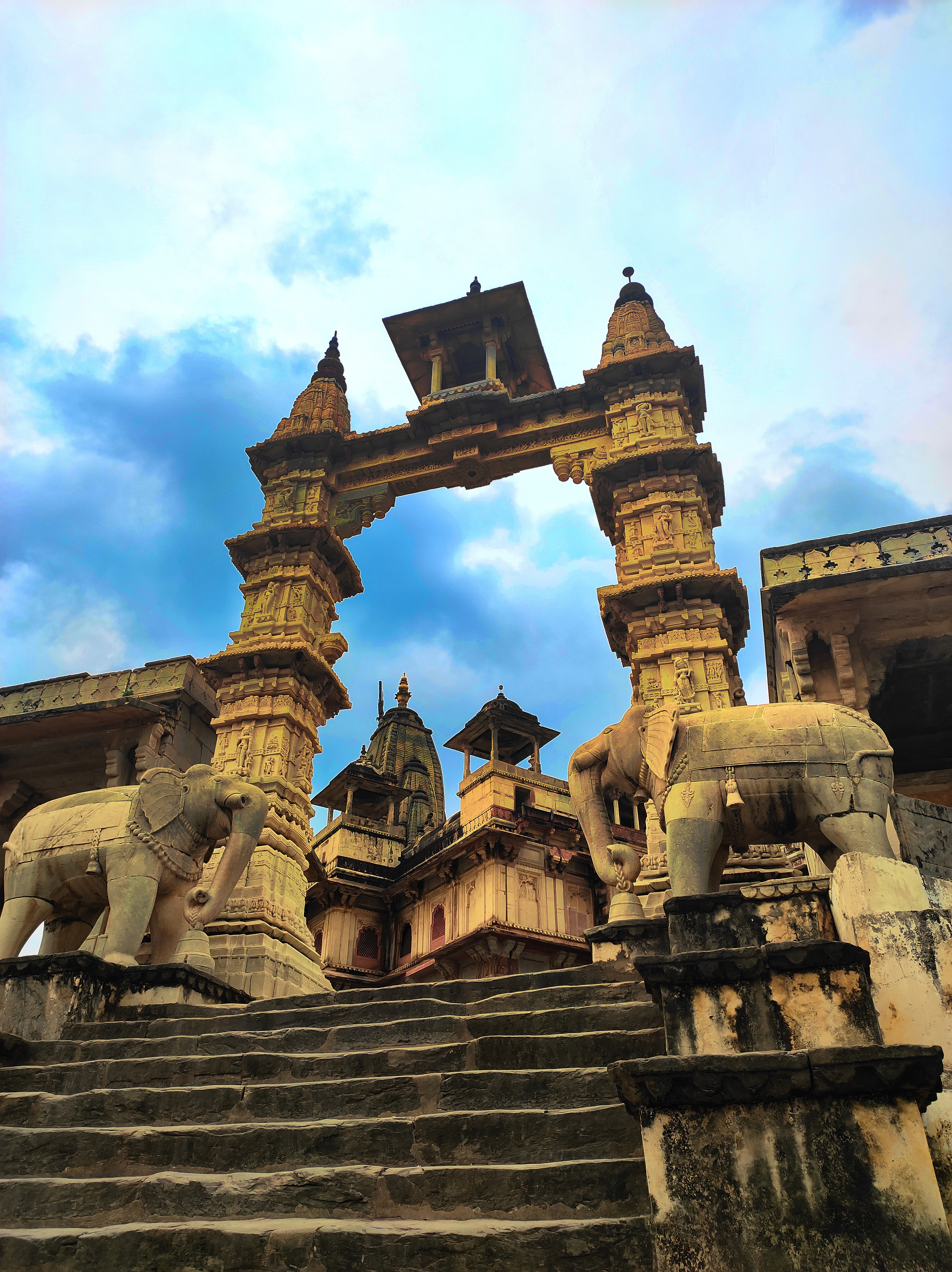
Aerial view of Jagat Shiromani Temple in Amer

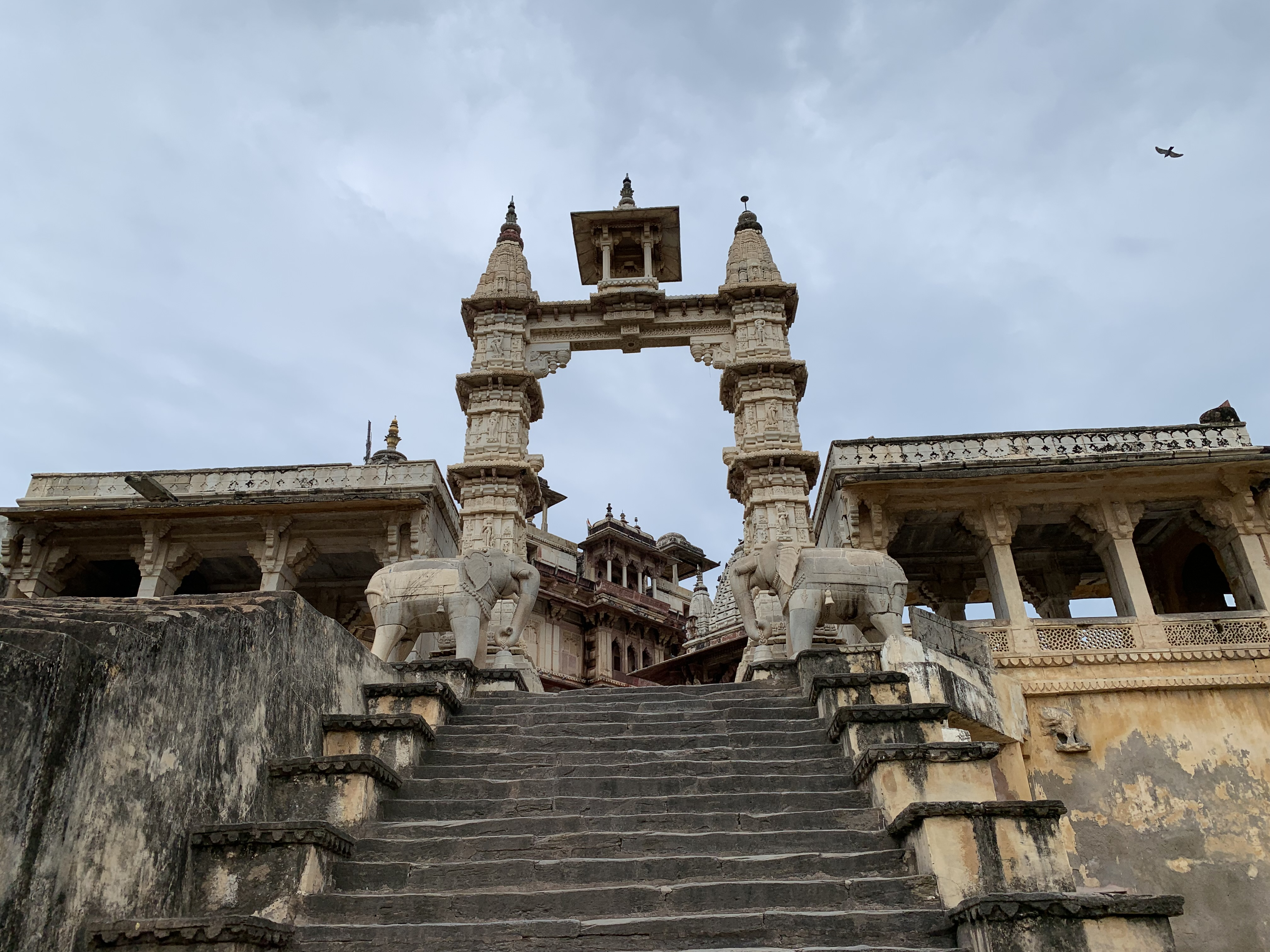
Front view with entrance steps

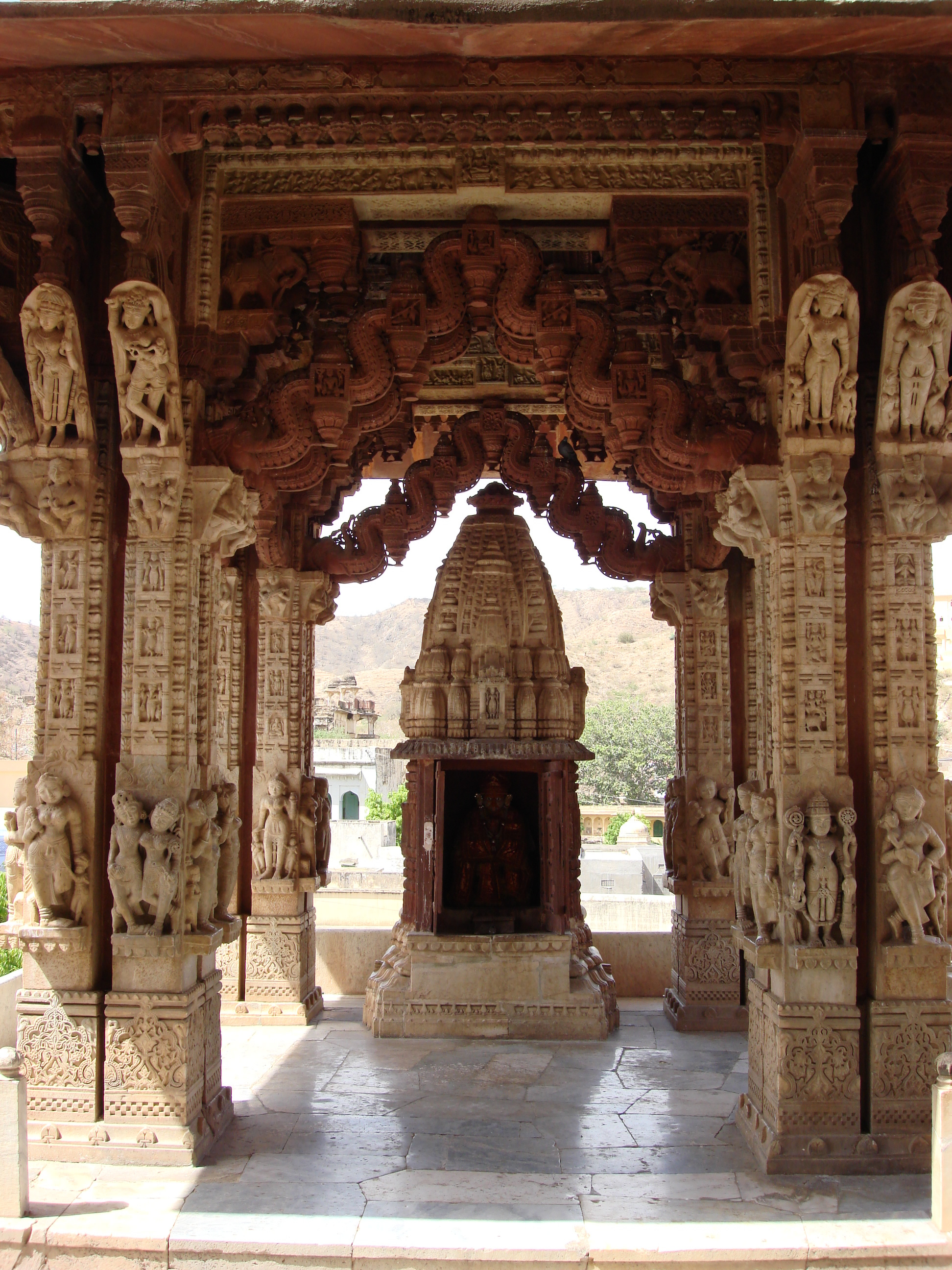
Archways and pillars inside the temple

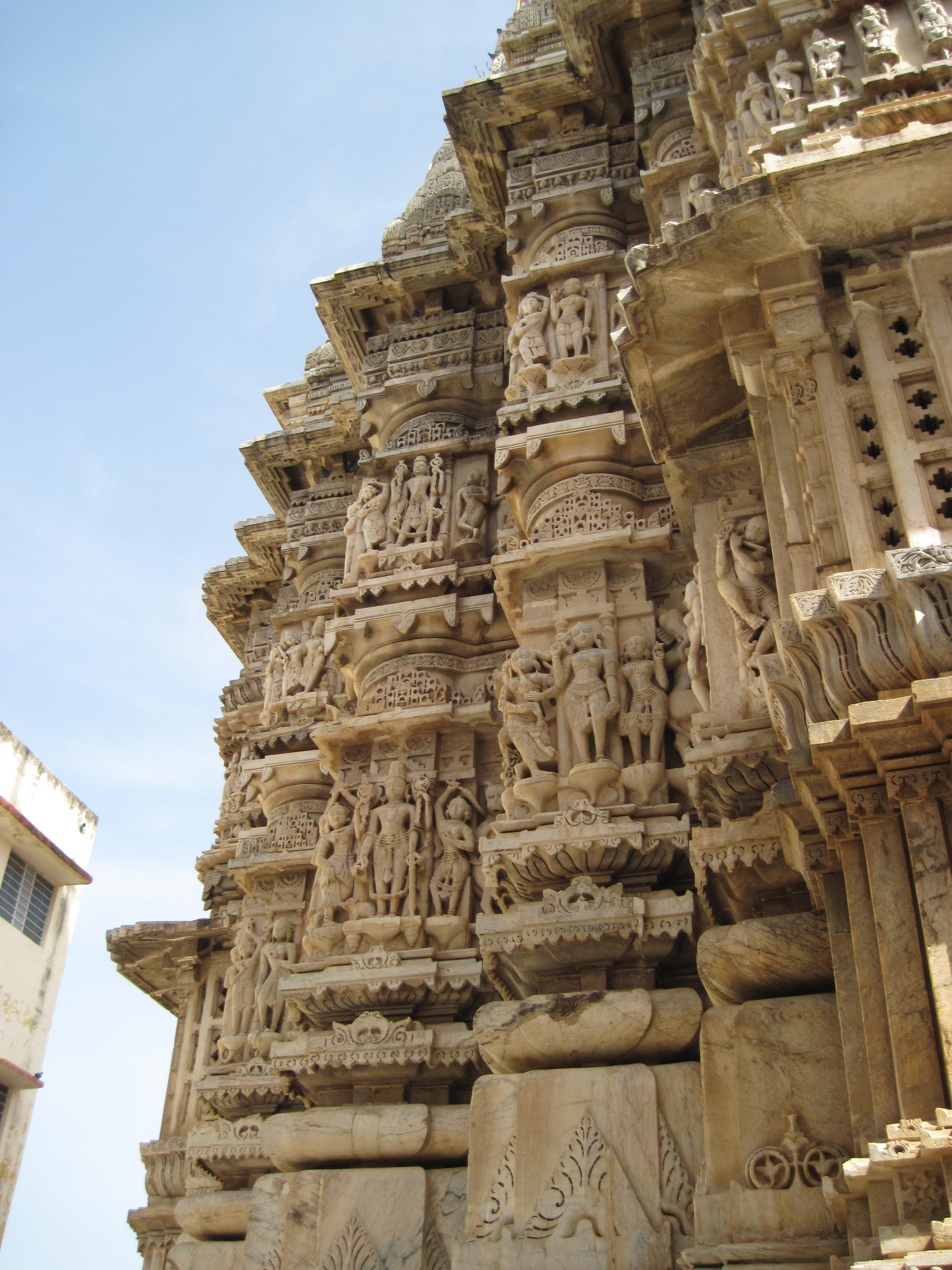
Detailed stone artwork on temple walls

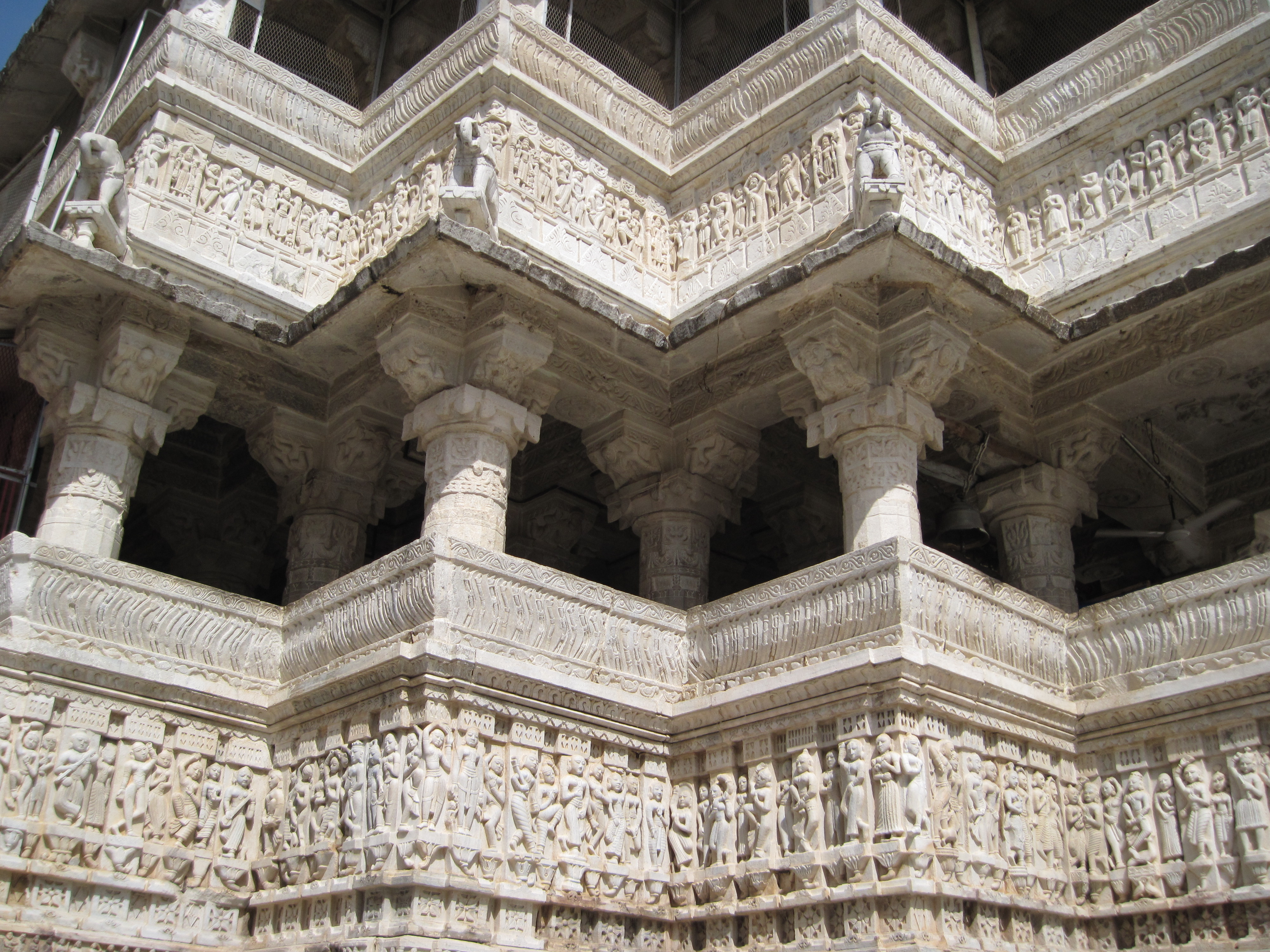
Interior hall with carved ceilings
