= Rupbas =

Rupbas Roopbas
- Town
- Location in Rajasthan, India Rupbas (India)
- Coordinates: 26°59′0″N 77°35′0″E
- Country: India
- State: Rajasthan
- District: Bharatpur

Government
  - Type: Democratic
  - Body: Municipality

Population (2011)
  - Total: 15,755

Languages
  - Official: Hindi
- Time zone: UTC+5:30 (IST)
- PIN: 321404
- Vehicle registration: RJ05

Rupbas is a town and a municipality in Rupbas Tehsil in Bharatpur district in the state of Rajasthan, India.
