= Chittorgarh district =

District of Rajasthan, India

Coordinates: 24°52′48″N 74°37′12″E

- District of Rajasthan
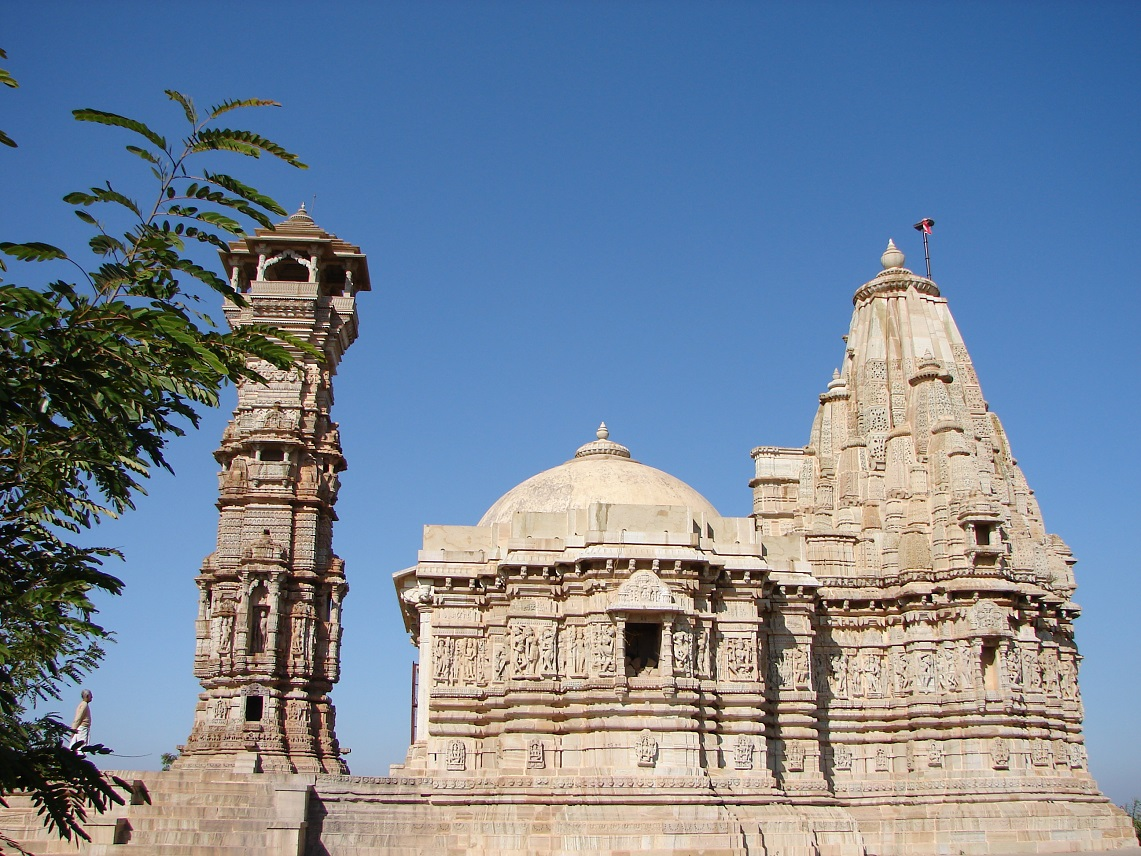
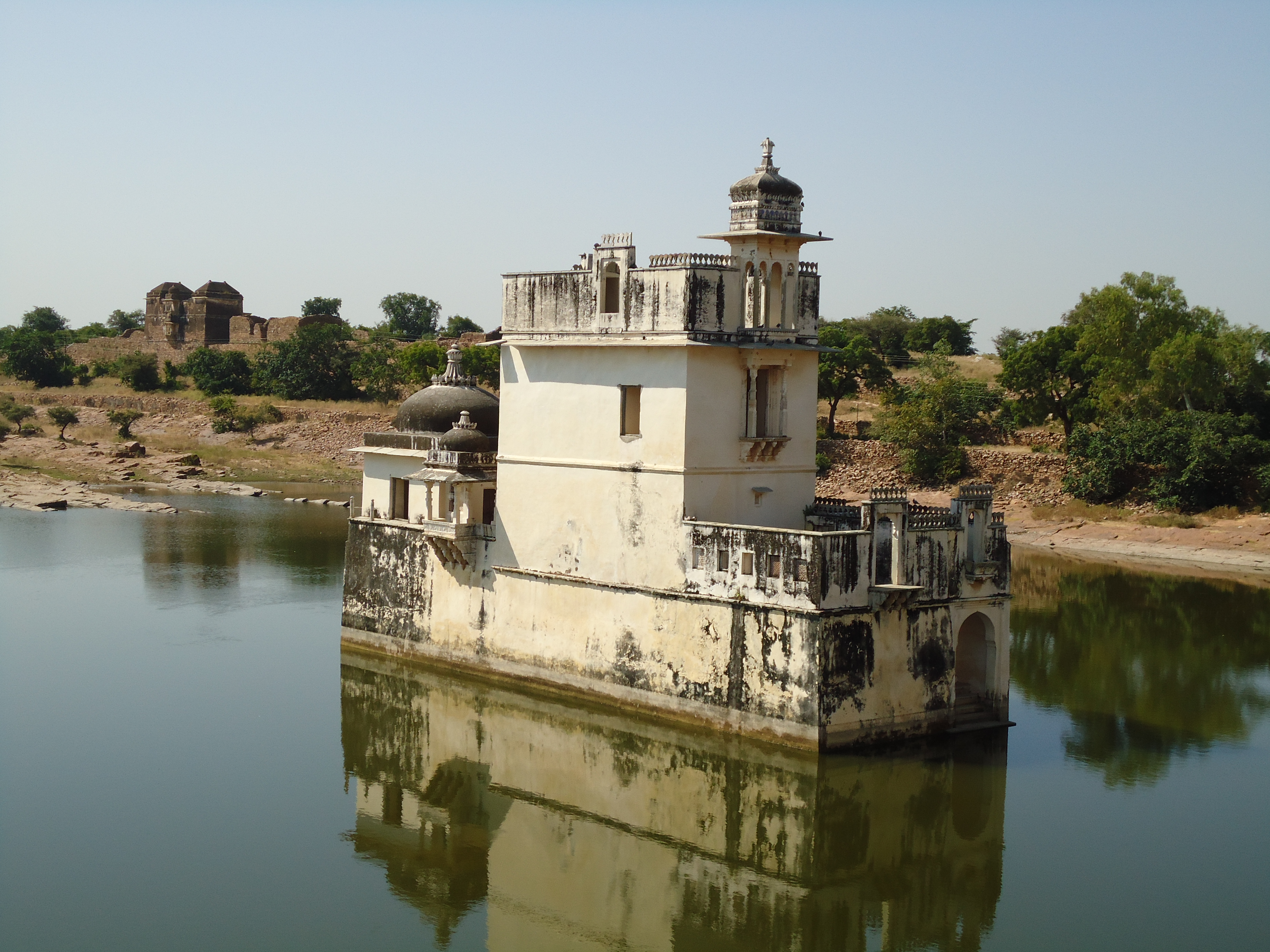
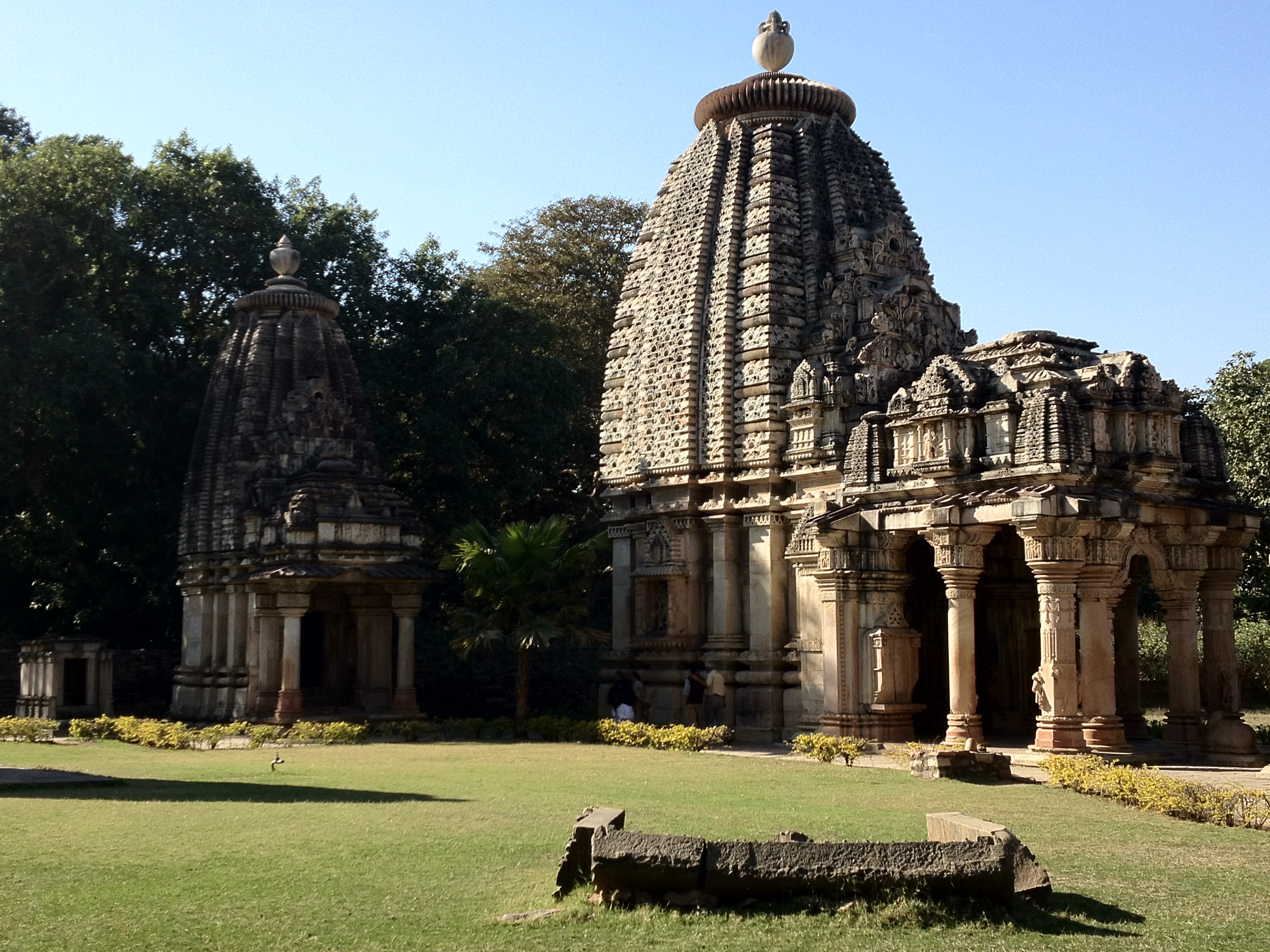
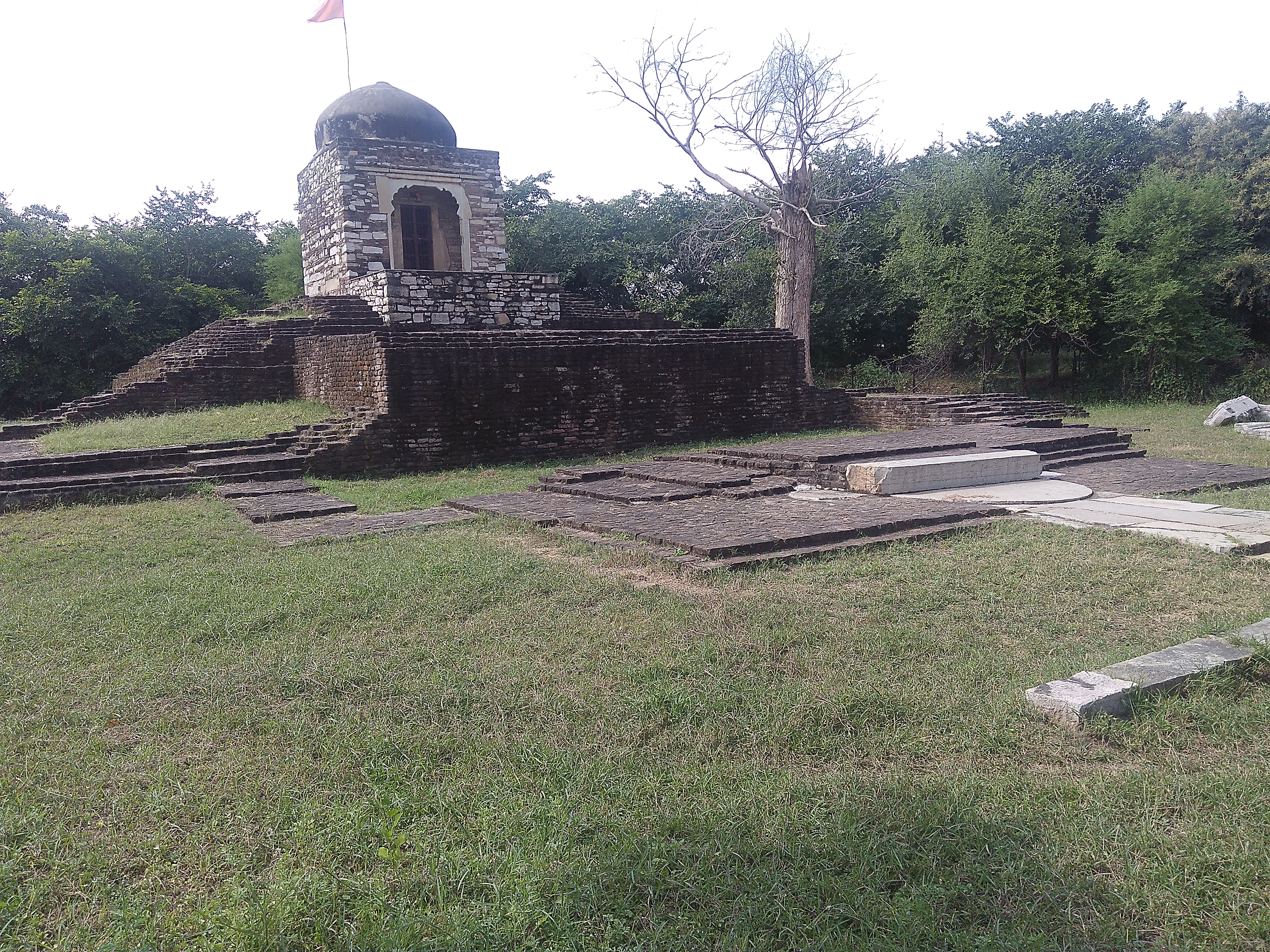
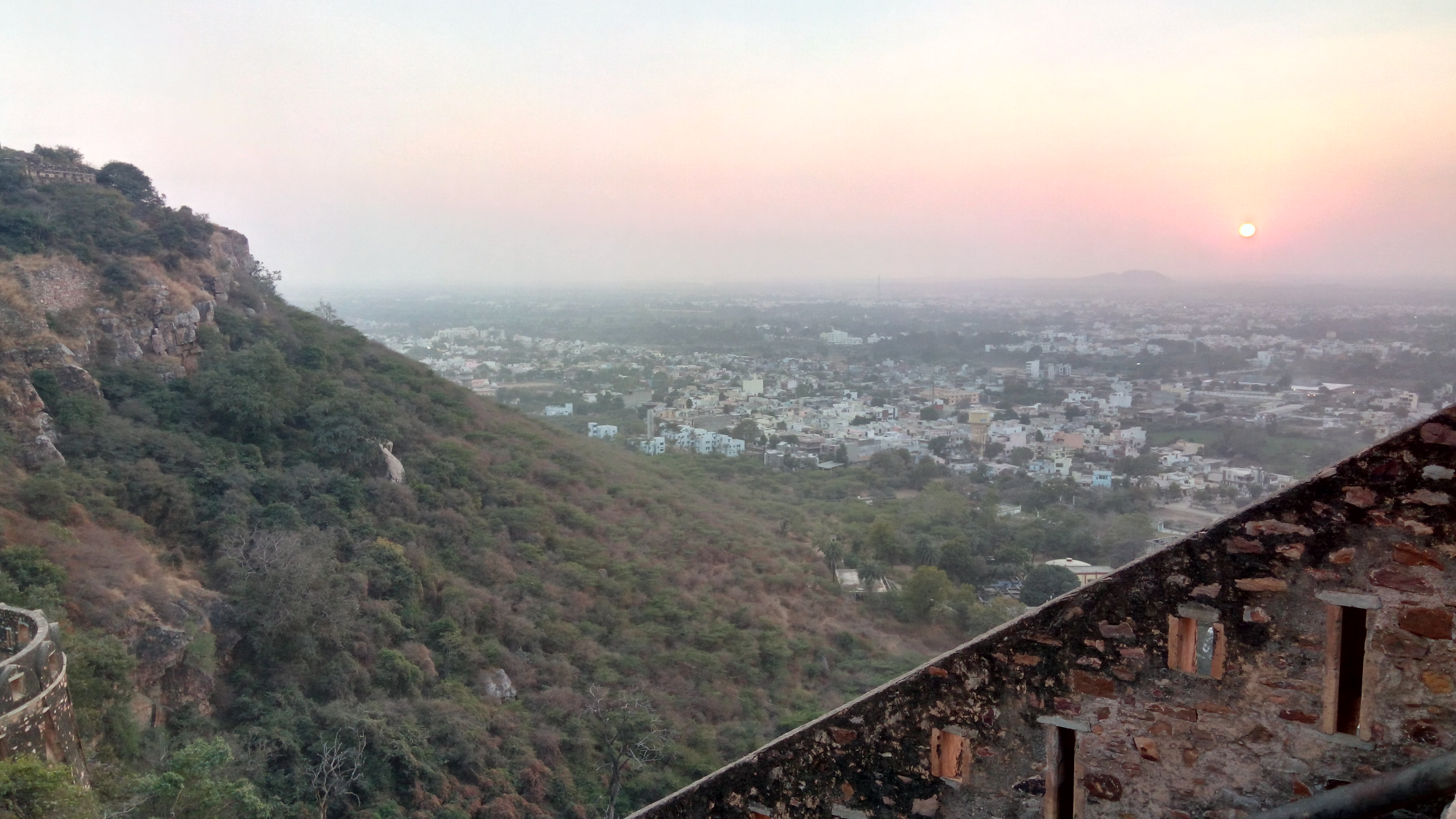
- Clockwise from top-left: Kirti Stambha with nearby temple at Chittorgarh Fort, Rani Padmini Palace, Dewaria Balaji Temple in Nagari, View of Chittorgarh city, Baroli Temples

- Chittorgarh district
- Country: India
- State: Rajasthan
- Division: Udaipur
- Headquarters: Chittaurgarh

Area
  - Total: 7,822 km^{2} (3,020 sq mi)

Population (2011)
  - Total: 1,544,338
  - Density: 197.4/km^{2} (511.4/sq mi)
- Time zone: UTC+05:30 (IST)

Chittorgarh district is one of the 41 districts of Rajasthan state in western India. The historic city of Chittorgarh (or Chittaurgarh) is the administrative headquarters of the district. The district was established on 1 August 1948 by integrating portions of various princely states: Mewar, Pratabgarh, Tonk, and Jhalawar. Chittaurgarh is famous for the Chittor fort, home to various famous Rajput dynasties.

== Economy ==
In 2006 the Ministry of Panchayati Raj named Chittorgarh one of the country's 250 most backward districts (out of a total of 640). It is one of the twelve districts in Rajasthan currently receiving funds from the Backward Regions Grant Fund Programme (BRGF).

== Demographics ==
Historical population
Year	Pop.	±% p.a.
1901	234,331	—
1911	288,969	+2.12%
1921	308,082	+0.64%
1931	352,415	+1.35%
1941	417,574	+1.71%
1951	472,109	+1.24%
1961	571,327	+1.93%
1971	714,436	+2.26%
1981	921,629	+2.58%
1991	1,104,610	+1.83%
2001	1,330,360	+1.88%
2011	1,544,338	+1.50%

Religions in Chittorgarh district (2011)
Religion	Percent
Hinduism	91.51%
Islam	6.34%
Jainism	1.67%
Other or not stated	0.48%

According to the 2011 census Chittorgarh district has a population of 1,544,338, roughly equal to the nation of Gabon or the US state of Hawaii. This gives it a ranking of 323rd in India (out of a total of 640).

The district has a population density of 193 inhabitants per square kilometre (500/sq mi) . Its population growth rate over the decade 2001-2011 was 16.09%. Chittaurgarh has a sex ratio of 970 females for every 1000 males, and a literacy rate of 62.51%. 18.47% of the population lives in urban areas. Scheduled Castes and Scheduled Tribes make up 16.20% and 13.05% of the population respectively.

Languages of Chittorgarh district (2011)
1. Mewari (67.9%)
2. Rajasthani (15.5%)
3. Hindi (13.9%)
4. Others (2.74%)

At the time of the 2011 census, 67.88% of the population spoke Mewari, 15.52% Rajasthani and 13.86% Hindi as their first language.

== See also ==
Sanwariaji Temple

- Kalika Mata Temple, Chittorgarh Fort
- Avari Mata temple
- Rana Pratap Sagar Dam
- Bhensrodgarh Wildlife Sanctuaries
- Chittorgarh Fort
- Baroli Temple
- Padhajhar Waterfall
- Chuliya Waterfall
- Menal Waterfall
- Nuclear Power Plant Rawatbhata Rajasthan
- Cement Factory Nimbaheda
- Charbhuja Nath ji temple
- Anokheraj Hanuman Ji temple
- Tejaji Maharaj Temple
- Banoda Balaji Temple
- Joganiya Mataji temple
