= Jawahar Sagar Wildlife Sanctuary =

Wildlife sanctuary in Rajasthan, India

- IUCN category IV (habitat/species management area)
- Location within Rajasthan Location within India
- Interactive map of Jawahar Sagar Wildlife Sanctuary
- Location: Rajasthan, India (Kota, Bundi & Chittorgarh districts)
- Nearest city: Kota
- Coordinates: 25.02°N 75.64°E
- Area: 194.6 km^{2} (75.1 sq mi)
- Established: 9 October 1975

Jawahar Sagar Wildlife Sanctuary is a protected area in southeastern Rajasthan, India. It was notified on 9 October 1975 and covers an area of approximately 194.6 km^{2} (75.1 sq mi), spanning the districts of Kota, Bundi, and Chittorgarh along the Chambal River.

The sanctuary forms part of the buffer zone of the Mukundara Hills Tiger Reserve, which was notified in 2013 under Project Tiger.

== Geography ==
The sanctuary lies between the Rana Pratap Sagar Dam and Jawahar Sagar Dam on the Chambal River. Its terrain consists of rugged ravines and tropical dry deciduous forest typical of the Chambal valley.

== Flora and fauna ==
The vegetation includes Terminalia pendula (dhok), Acacia catechu (khair), Butea monosperma (palash), Madhuca longifolia (mahua), Diospyros melanoxylon (tendu), and Terminalia bellirica (bahera). Wildlife includes leopard, sloth bear, chinkara, sambar, wild boar, striped hyena, and small carnivores. The Chambal River supports aquatic species such as gharial and mugger crocodile.

== See also ==
- Mukundara Hills National Park
- National Chambal Sanctuary
- Darrah Wildlife Sanctuary
