= Jawahar Sagar Dam =

Dam in Rajasthan, northern India

- Interactive map of Jawahar Sagar Dam
- Location: Chambal River, Rajasthan, India
- Coordinates: 25.0372°N 75.6780°E
- Purpose: Hydroelectricity, Irrigation
- Status: Operational
- Opening date: 1972
- Owner: Government of India

Dam and spillways
- Type of dam: Concrete gravity dam
- Height: 45 m (148 ft)
- Length: 393 m (1,289 ft)

Reservoir
- Total capacity: 67.07 million cubic meters (2.37 tmcft)

Power Station
- Installed capacity: 3 units of 33 MW

The Jawahar Sagar Dam is the third dam in the series of Chambal Valley Projects on the Chambal River, located 29 km upstream of Kota city and 26 km downstream of Rana Pratap Sagar dam. It is a concrete gravity dam, 45 meters high and 393 meters long, generating 60 MW of power with an installed capacity of 3 units of 33 MW. Its construction was completed in 1972. The dam's gross storage capacity is 67.07 million cubic meters (2.37 tmcft). The total catchment area of the dam is 27,195 km^{2}, of which only 1,496 km^{2} are in Rajasthan. The free catchment area below Rana Pratap Sagar dam is 2,331 km^{2}. The dam is located after the Gandhi Sagar Dam and Rana Pratap Sagar Dam, but before the Kota Barrage.

== Geography ==
The Chambal River (known in ancient times as the Chamranyavati River) raises in the Vindhya Range at an elevation of 853 metres (2,799 ft), 15 kilometres (9.3 mi) west-southwest of the town of Mhow, near Indore. It flows north-northeast through Madhya Pradesh, runs for a time through Rajasthan, then forms the boundary between Rajasthan and Madhya Pradesh before turning southeast to join the Yamuna River in the state of Uttar Pradesh. Its total length from its source to its confluence with the Yamuna River is 900 kilometres (560 mi).

The Chambal and its tributaries drain the Malwa region of northwestern Madhya Pradesh, while its tributary, the Banas, which rises in the Aravalli Range, drains southeastern Rajasthan. At its confluence with the Yamuna, the Chambal joins four other rivers – the Yamuna, Kwari, Sind, and Pahuj – at Pachnada near Bhareh in Uttar Pradesh, at the border of the Bhind and Etawah districts. The river is drained by a rain-fed catchment area with an average annual rainfall of 860 millimetres (34 in), a temperature range of between 2 °C (36 °F) and 40 °C (104 °F), and a relative humidity ranging from 30% to 90%.

Between 344 kilometres (214 mi) and 440 kilometres (270 mi) from the Chambal's source is an area of deep gorges; the Gandhi Sagar Dam is located in the middle reach of this gorge section. The dam is situated at a distance of 168 kilometres (104 mi) from the district administrative headquarters of Mandsaur.

== Construction History ==
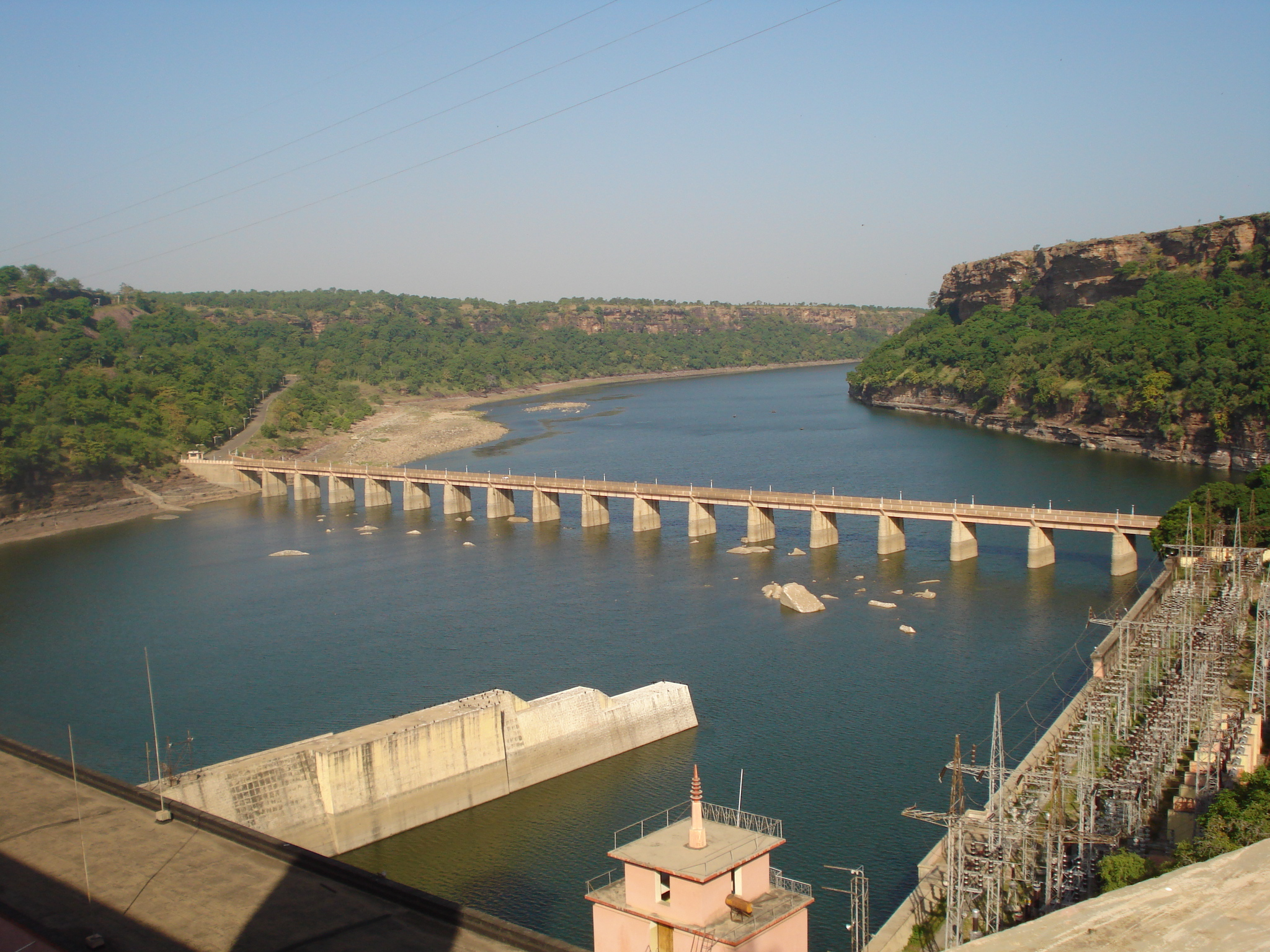
The power station on the right bank of the Gandhi Sagar dam and the downstream bridge across the Chambal River.

The Chambal River Valley Development marked one of the landmark actions of the First Five-Year Plan launched by the Government of India in 1951, after India attained independence in August 1947. The Chambal River had not until then been used for any major developmental works, and was proposed to be developed under a joint initiative of the state governments of Madhya Pradesh and Rajasthan. The three-stage proposal, drawn up in 1953, called for three dams to provide hydroelectric power generation, and a downstream barrage to use stored waters released from the upstream dams for irrigation. The river's drop of 625 metres (2,051 ft) between its source in Mhow and the city of Kota, which marks the exit of the river from its gorge section into the plains of Rajasthan, was seen as having great hydroelectric potential.

=== Stage I ===
The first stage of the development involved construction of the Gandhi Sagar Dam to a height of a 62.17 metres (204.0 ft) as a storage dam to store 7,322,000,000 cubic metres in Madhya Pradesh and use the stored water for hydroelectric power generation, followed by irrigation from the Kota Barrage in Rajasthan, 104 kilometres (65 mi) downstream of the dam. Power generation at Gandhi Sagar Dam was through a powerhouse at the toe of the dam, with a total installed capacity of 115 MW (divided into five units of 23 MW). The Kota Barrage, an earth and masonry structure 37.34 metres (122.5 ft) in height, was built to provide irrigation through a canal system, with two main canals on the right and left banks. Construction of both projects began in 1953–54; both began functioning in 1960. The water received at the Kota Barrage is shared equally between Madhya Pradesh and Rajasthan for irrigation.

=== Stage II ===
The second stage of development involved the use of the water released from the Gandhi Sagar Dam through another dam structure, the Rana Pratap Sagar Dam, located 48 kilometres (30 mi) downstream of the Gandhi Sagar at Rawatbhata in the Chittorgarh District of Rajasthan. Additional storage at this dam provides an increase in irrigation benefits from the Kota Barrage, increasing its area of irrigation from 445,000 hectares (1,100,000 acres) to 567,000 hectares (1,400,000 acres). In addition, a powerhouse at the toe of the dam provides an additional hydroelectric power generation capacity of 172 MW from four turbo generators, of 43 MW capacity each. The second stage was completed in 1970. The power generated at the Rana Pratap Sagar Dam is shared equally with Madhya Pradesh, as the Gandhi Sagar Dam provides the stored waters for use at this dam.

=== Stage III ===
The third and final stage of development envisaged an intermediate dam between the Rana Pratap Sagar Dam and the Kota Barrage, called the Jawahar Sagar Dam. This dam is a concrete gravity dam, 45 metres (148 ft) high, located approximately 23 kilometres (14 mi) upstream of Kota Barrage to its southwest, and provides a hydroelectric power generation capacity of 99 MW, with three generator units of 33 MW capacity each. This project was commissioned in 1972.

== See also ==
- Jawahar Sagar Wildlife Sanctuary
