= Mukundara Hills Tiger Reserve =

Tiger reserve in Rajasthan, India

- IUCN category II (national park)
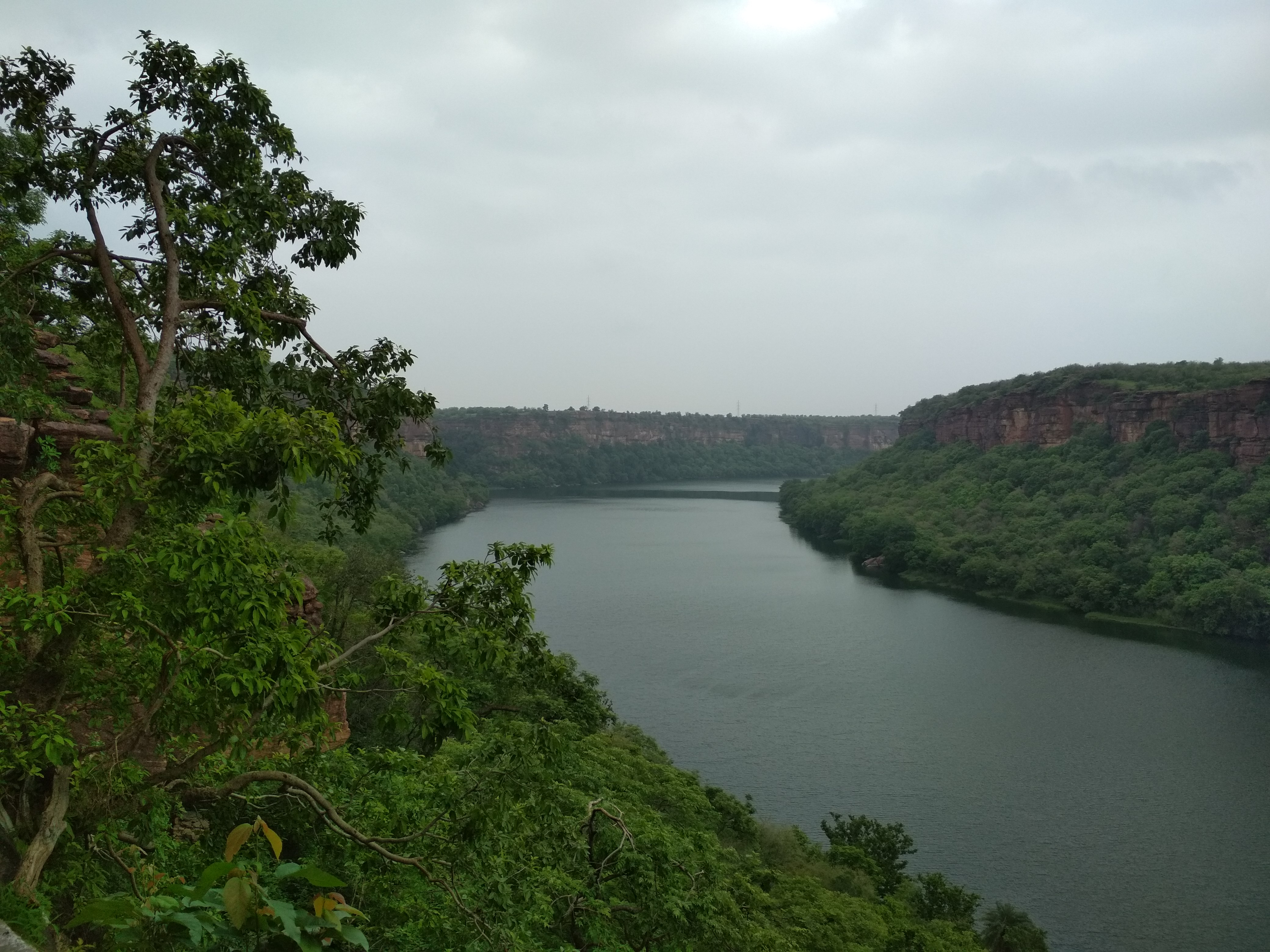
- View from Garadiya Mahadev

- Location within Rajasthan Location within India
- Outline shows the national park only; the tiger reserve around it is much larger.
- Location: Rajasthan, India
- Nearest city: Kota
- Coordinates: 24.868°N 75.856°E
- Area: Tiger reserve: 1,135.787 km^{2} (438.530 sq mi); National park: 199.55 km^{2} (77.05 sq mi)
- Established: 9 January 2012 (national park); 9 April 2013 (tiger reserve)
- Governing body: Rajasthan Forest Department

Mukundara Hills Tiger Reserve (also spelled Mukundra or Mukandra) is a tiger reserve in Rajasthan, India. Its core includes Mukundara Hills National Park. The national park covers 199.55 km^{2} (77.05 sq mi). The Government of Rajasthan notified the tiger reserve on 9 April 2013 with an area of 759.99 km^{2} (293.43 sq mi), and a notification of 5 October 2023 enlarged it to 1,135.787 km^{2} (438.530 sq mi), of which 690.71 km^{2} (266.68 sq mi) is core (critical tiger habitat) and 445.08 km^{2} (171.85 sq mi) is buffer. The reserve covers parts of Kota, Bundi, Chittorgarh and Jhalawar districts. Its core is made up of the national park, Darrah Wildlife Sanctuary, Jawahar Sagar Wildlife Sanctuary and part of the National Chambal Sanctuary, and in 2023 Bhainsrodgarh Sanctuary was added to it.

The reserve is named after two almost parallel, flat-topped hills of the Vindhya Range that extend for about 80 km from the Chambal to the Kali Sindh. It lies in the Khathiar-Gir dry deciduous forests.

== History ==
The reserve contains large tracts of forests formerly part of the Maharaja of Kota's hunting grounds. The hills are named after Maharao Mukund, a former ruler of Kota. Before the formation of Rajasthan, these forests belonged to the princely states of Kota, Chittorgarh, Bundi and Jhalawar and were managed as hunting reserves. Part of the forest was declared Darrah Sanctuary in 1955, although the former rulers kept their hunting rights until 1971–72. Jawahar Sagar Sanctuary was declared on 9 October 1975. Before independence the Jawahar Sagar forests had been a shikargah, an area reserved for hunting, of the Kota and Bundi states, and Jhalawar's forests were mainly preserved for shikar. A portion of Darrah Sanctuary was later notified as Mukundara Hills National Park. The state government announced its intention to declare the national park on 3 March 2006 (published in the Rajasthan Gazette on 10 March 2006); after rights had been settled in Chittorgarh district in August 2009 and in Kota district in August 2011, it declared the park, on land in Kota and Chittorgarh districts, on 9 January 2012. The park was embroiled in a political controversy over its nomenclature, when the Bharatiya Janata Party state government revoked the decision that it be called the Rajiv Gandhi National Park.

The Government of Rajasthan notified Mukundara Hills Tiger Reserve on 9 April 2013, with 417.17 km^{2} (161.07 sq mi) of critical tiger habitat and 342.82 km^{2} (132.36 sq mi) of buffer, a total of 759.99 km^{2} (293.43 sq mi). A notification of 5 October 2023 amended the 2013 notification and enlarged the reserve to 1,135.787 km^{2} (438.530 sq mi). According to the Tiger Conservation Plan, Bhainsrodgarh Sanctuary was added to the reserve's core by this order.

== Geography ==
The reserve lies between 24°38′ and 25°7′ N latitude and 75°26′ and 76°12′ E longitude, and is administered from Kota. The hills that give it its name are 2 to 5 km wide. Four perennial rivers drain the reserve: the Chambal to the north-west, the Kali Sindh to the north-east, the Ahu to the east and the Amjhar to the south. Most of their course lies along the reserve's outer boundary, but the Chambal and Ahu pass through its core.

The hills belong to the Vindhya Range and consist of two continuous, almost parallel flat-topped ridges with narrow central crests, about 80 km long, running from the Chambal to the Kali Sindh; the highest point, in the Chandbawri forest block, is 517 m above sea level. The rock is mainly basaltic trap, and the area also contains sandstone, limestone and conglomerate of the Vindhyan Supergroup. The trap weathers to black cotton soil (regur) and to laterite, but most of the core is covered by sandy loam; on the slopes the soil is shallow and stony. Besides the rivers, seasonal streams such as the Jhamra, Junapani and Selzar, which are dry for most of the year, and perennial springs including Ambarani, Ambapani and Padajhar supply water.

The climate is sub-tropical, with summer from mid-March to mid-June, the monsoon from mid-June to September and winter from October to mid-March. Average annual rainfall is 730 mm, more than 90 per cent of it between June and September, on an average of 27 rainy days. The maximum temperature rises to 46 °C in May and June, and in January, the coldest month, the minimum may fall to about 8 °C. Frosts are common in the valleys and depressions in December and January, and droughts are frequent, when the waterholes dry up early and fodder runs short.

== Eco-sensitive zones ==
The Ministry of Environment, Forest and Climate Change notified an eco-sensitive zone of 248.70 km^{2} (96.02 sq mi) around the tiger reserve on 25 November 2020, extending from zero to 1 km beyond the reserve's boundary. A separate eco-sensitive zone of 304.70 km^{2} (117.65 sq mi), extending from zero to 9.6 km, was notified around Bhainsrodgarh Wildlife Sanctuary on 10 September 2021, before the sanctuary was added to the reserve's core in 2023.

== Management ==
The reserve is administered by the Rajasthan Forest Department from Kota. The National Tiger Conservation Authority's Management Effectiveness Evaluation of September 2022 rated the reserve "Good" with a score of 60.16%; the two previous evaluations, in 2014 and 2018, had rated it "Fair". Camera trapping for the 2022 national tiger estimation, with 169 camera points and 8,451 trap-nights, identified one tiger. The estimation report described the reserve's linear shape as a major challenge for holding a sizeable tiger population without conflict with people, and said a resident population would need prey augmentation and inviolate core areas created through voluntary relocation of villages.

== Wildlife ==
The reserve is mountainous and has a variety of plants, trees and animals. It has grasslands in between and also many dry deciduous trees. There are four rivers that flow in this region, the rivers are Chambal river, Kali Sindh river, Ahu River, Amjhar river.

The forests are dry deciduous. Dhok (Anogeissus pendula) is the predominant tree, along with khair (Acacia catechu), ber (Ziziphus mauritiana), tendu (Diospyros melanoxylon), gurjan (Lannea coromandelica) and karaya (Sterculia urens). On higher slopes it is replaced by Anogeissus latifolia, with bel (Aegle marmelos), salar (Boswellia serrata) and shisham (Dalbergia latifolia).

The reserve's Tiger Conservation Plan records 347 indigenous and naturalised plant species in 86 families: 83 trees, 37 shrubs, 48 climbers, 127 herbs, 40 grasses, two epiphytes, three parasites and seven pteridophytes. The Plan places the forests in the dry deciduous group of the Champion and Seth classification. Dhok covers more than 90 per cent of the forested area; tree growth is slow and trees are usually only 4.5–7.5 m tall. Salai dominates the hill summits and khair is common in the valleys, bamboo (Dendrocalamus strictus) grows along the streams, and palash (Butea monosperma) dominates at the foot of the hills and on the plains. About 35 per cent of the forest area is bare rock or degraded scrub. The Plan lists Prosopis juliflora, Lantana camara, Parthenium, Cassia tora, van tulsi and Nyctanthes arbor-tristis, which has spread like a weed into old felling coupes, among the invasive plants affecting the forest, and the 2022 management evaluation named infestation by Prosopis, Lantana and Ocimum as a limiting factor for herbivores.

Tree species recorded in the forests of the reserve include Acacia nilotica, Atrocarpus heterophyllus, Aegle marmelos, Azadirachta indica, Bombax ceiba, Breonia (syn. Anthocephalus), Cassia fistula, Citrus aurantifolia, Delonix regia, Dalbergia sissoo, Phyllanthus emblica, Eucalyptus, Ficus religiosa, Ficus glomerata, Ficus benghalensis.

Bengal tiger, Indian wolf and Indian leopard are the major carnivores in this reserve. Prey species include chital, sambar deer, wild boar and nilgai. Sloth bear and chinkara also inhabit the area. The Tiger Conservation Plan also lists the golden jackal, striped hyena, caracal, jungle cat, small Indian civet, Asian palm civet, Indian grey mongoose, ruddy mongoose, Indian hare, five-striped palm squirrel, Indian pangolin, porcupine, smooth-coated otter, blackbuck, four-horned antelope (locally bhedal), Hanuman langur and rhesus macaque; sloth bears are present in good numbers, especially around Jhamra and Borkui. The 2022 management evaluation also records the fox and the ratel, and the 2022 tiger status report considers the dhole extinct in the area. Reptiles include the mugger crocodile and the gharial.

Rivers and streams and water bodies such as Girdharpura, Mandargarh, Ramsagar, Laxmipura and Nolav provide habitat for terrestrial, arboreal and water birds. The grey junglefowl keeps to bushy thickets in the interior, while the painted sandgrouse, Indian grey hornbill, Alexandrine parakeet, yellow-footed green pigeon and sarus crane are seen frequently. Large winter congregations of birds gather on the Chambal and at Selzar, Girdharpura, Bewda talai, Gagron fort, Naulav, Laxmipura, Jhamra and Karoundi, where annual waterbird counts are carried out. Species recorded include the bar-headed goose, painted stork, Asian openbill, Eurasian spoonbill, osprey, the near-threatened red-headed falcon and the critically endangered white-rumped vulture and red-headed vulture. Snakes include the Indian rock python, Indian rat snake, red sand boa and common trinket snake, and four venomous species: the spectacled cobra, common krait, Russell's viper and saw-scaled viper. The Indian monitor lizard, Indian star tortoise and Indian flapshell turtle occur, and amphibians include the Indian bullfrog, Indian balloon frog and Indian skipper frog.

=== Tigers ===
Tigers were once found throughout the area, but the Tiger Conservation Plan dates the last record of tiger presence to 1978. In April 2003 a tiger known as "Broken Tail" appeared in the reserve; it was killed in a train accident on 15 July 2003. After tigers disappeared, the leopard became the apex predator. Reintroduction began on 3 April 2018, when a male, T-91 (MT-1), that had strayed from Ranthambore Tiger Reserve to Ramgarh Vishdhari Wildlife Sanctuary was moved into an 82 km^{2} (32 sq mi) enclosure in the reserve. A tigress, T-106 (MT-2), was brought from Ranthambore on 19 December 2018. A male, T-98 (MT-3), reached the reserve from Ranthambore on its own along the Chambal and Kali Sindh rivers and was confirmed by camera trap on 9 February 2019, and a tigress, T-83 (MT-4), was translocated from Ranthambore on 12 April 2019. MT-3 died on 23 July 2020 and MT-2 on 3 August 2020; MT-1 has been missing since 20 August 2020, and MT-4 died on 4 May 2023.

More tigers were translocated from Ranthambore: a male, T-110 (MT-5), on 3 November 2022, and tigresses T-2301 (MT-6) on 9 August 2023 and RBT2507 (MT-8) on 19 June 2025. A female cub (MT-7) was brought from Abheda Biological Park on 11 December 2024 and kept in a 5-hectare rewilding enclosure. The Tiger Conservation Plan lists MT-5, MT-6 and MT-8 as roaming in the reserve.

== See also ==
- Arid Forest Research Institute (AFRI)
- Indian Council of Forestry Research and Education
- Jawahar Sagar Dam
- Wildlife of India
