= Rawatbhata =

- City
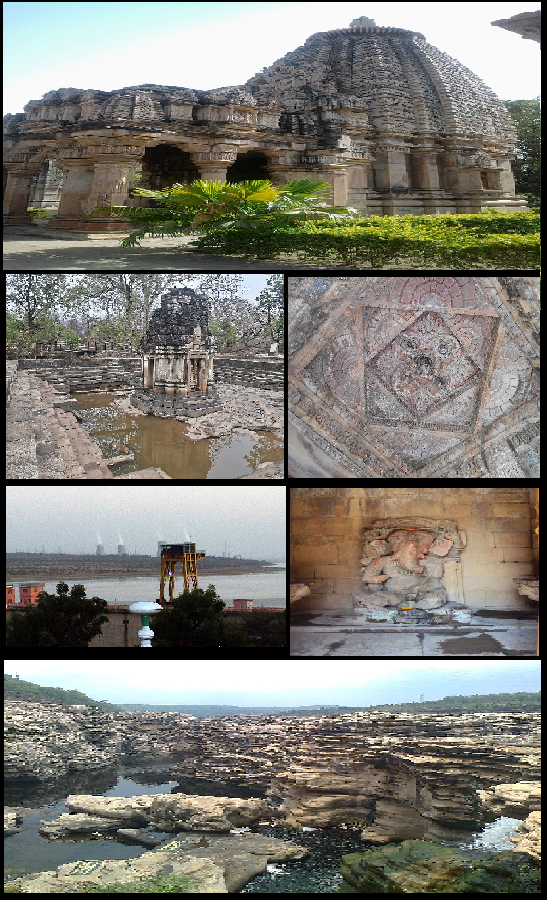
- Nicknames: Nuclear City, Kashmir of Rajasthan, City of Waterfalls
- Location in Rajasthan, India Rawatbhata (India)
- Coordinates: 24.93°N 75.58°E
- Country: India
- State: Rajasthan
- District: Chittorgarh
- Division: Udaipur Division

Government
  - Type: Democratic
  - Body: Nagar Palika Rawatbhata
  - Member of Parliament Chittorgarh: Chandra Prakash Joshi (Bhartiya Janta Party)
  - Member of Legislative assembly Rawatbhata - Begun: Dr. Suresh Dhaker (Bhartiya janta party)

Area
  - Total: 48.97 km^{2} (18.91 sq mi)
- Elevation: 325 m (1,066 ft)

Population (2011)
  - Total: 51,965
  - Density: 1,061/km^{2} (2,750/sq mi)

Languages
  - Official: Hindi, Mewari
- Time zone: UTC+5:30 (IST)
- PIN: 323307, 323305, 323306
- Area Code(s): 01475
- ISO 3166 code: RJ-IN
- Vehicle registration: RJ-09
- Sex Ratio: 927/1000
- Website: https://lsg.urban.rajasthan.gov.in/ulbrawatbhata

Rawatbhata is a city, Tehsil headquarter, Sub District headquarter and Nagar Palika in Chittorgarh District, Rajasthan, Rawatbhata is also known as the nuclear city of Rajasthan and India's first nuclear city. Rawatbhata is a proposed district headquarter, it is 6th largest city in Udaipur Division. it is 131 km from district headquarter Chittorgarh city and 50 km from the nearest city, Kota. The city has eight nuclear reactors, a nuclear fuel complex and a heavy water plant. Rawatbhata also has the biggest dam of Rajasthan, Rana Pratap Sagar Dam, which is built on the Chambal River. The dam is equipped with a 172 MW hydroelectric power station.

Rawatbhata Panchayat was promoted to a municipality on 31 December 1997. As of 2025, the Rawatbhata Municipality comprises the original urban area along with several newly added villages, as per Government Notification No. 681 (dated 10 January 2025). The newly included areas are:

- Gram Panchayat Badoliya: Villages of Badoliya(baroli), Jawara buzurg, Jawar kalan, and Tinduva
- Gram Panchayat Jhalarbaori: Villages of Jhalarbaori and thamlao
- Gram Panchayat Sanita: Villages of Sanita, Sankhalo ka Dunda, Mahupura, Devpuriya, Kacholiya, and Neem ka Kheda

With these additions, the municipal population has increased to 51,965, and the jurisdiction now covers approximately 40 km^{2}. The city is divided into 40 wards, and elections are held every 5 years. The municipality provides basic services like water supply and sewerage to approximately 11,000 households.

== Geography ==
Rawatbhata is located at 24.93°N 75.58°E. It has an average elevation of 325 metres (1066 feet).

=== Climate ===
Climate data for Rawatbhata (1981–2010, extremes 1955–2008)
Month	Jan	Feb	Mar	Apr	May	Jun	Jul	Aug	Sep	Oct	Nov	Dec	Year
Record high °C (°F)	34.6 (94.3)	37.8 (100.0)	41.9 (107.4)	46.0 (114.8)	47.6 (117.7)	46.1 (115.0)	46.1 (115.0)	41.3 (106.3)	40.6 (105.1)	40.6 (105.1)	37.2 (99.0)	32.6 (90.7)	47.6 (117.7)
Mean daily maximum °C (°F)	24.2 (75.6)	27.4 (81.3)	32.8 (91.0)	37.7 (99.9)	41.1 (106.0)	38.9 (102.0)	33.0 (91.4)	30.9 (87.6)	32.5 (90.5)	32.8 (91.0)	29.0 (84.2)	25.3 (77.5)	32.1 (89.8)
Mean daily minimum °C (°F)	10.3 (50.5)	12.8 (55.0)	17.7 (63.9)	22.7 (72.9)	26.9 (80.4)	27.0 (80.6)	25.0 (77.0)	23.8 (74.8)	23.1 (73.6)	19.6 (67.3)	14.7 (58.5)	10.9 (51.6)	19.5 (67.1)
Record low °C (°F)	0.0 (32.0)	0.5 (32.9)	5.5 (41.9)	12.9 (55.2)	15.6 (60.1)	16.3 (61.3)	17.4 (63.3)	15.6 (60.1)	14.4 (57.9)	8.3 (46.9)	3.3 (37.9)	−1.1 (30.0)	−1.1 (30.0)
Average rainfall mm (inches)	3.8 (0.15)	3.9 (0.15)	3.1 (0.12)	5.2 (0.20)	7.9 (0.31)	82.3 (3.24)	255.3 (10.05)	276.4 (10.88)	104.7 (4.12)	26.7 (1.05)	8.8 (0.35)	2.9 (0.11)	780.9 (30.74)
Average rainy days	0.4	0.4	0.4	0.6	0.8	4.5	10.1	11.2	5.6	1.3	0.5	0.2	36.1
Average relative humidity (%) (at 17:30 IST)	40	32	26	22	23	39	65	75	60	39	36	40	41
Source: India Meteorological Department

== Demographics ==
As of the India census, Rawatbhata had a population of 51965 (37,701+14266). Males constituted 51.8% of the population and females 48.2%. Rawatbhata had a literacy rate of 85.82%, higher than the national literacy rate of 74.04%: Male literacy was 92.19%, and female literacy was 79.01%. In Rawatbhata, 12.27% of the population is under 6 years of age. The place is mainly dominated by Gurjars. In 1960s, due to the location of this remote place on Chambal river and least resistance by local tribal communities, this place was chosen for building nuclear power plant with support from Canadian-based AECL.

== Schools ==
=== Government Schools ===
==== Central Government ====
Atomic Energy Education Society which has headquarters in Mumbai, runs

- Atomic Energy Central School No.2 ( Classes Pre- Prep to 10th-CBSE-English Medium)
- Atomic Energy Central School No.3 (Classes Pre- Prep to 12th -Arts & Commerce CBSE) (Pre-Prep to VI – English Medium & VII to XII – Both Medium)
- Atomic Energy Central School No.4 (Classes Pre-Prep to 12th – Science CBSE- English Medium).

Shreya Ghoshal is an alumna of AECS No. 4.

The AEES administrates all the AEC schools all over India where there are centres of Department of Atomic Energy. These schools admit students whose parents are in the Department of Atomic Energy and other Central Government Departments as well as Non-DAE's but charge them higher fees.

==== State Government ====
There are two (1 boys & 1 girls) Senior Secondary Schools, 2 Secondary Schools, 2 Upper Primary Boys, 5 Primary Schools and 1 Sanskrit Secondary school.

== Colleges ==
- Government College, Rawatbhata (B.A, B.Com & B.Sc)
- Government Nursing College, Rawatbhata (B.Sc Nursing)
- Government Industrial Training Institute, Rawatbhata (Fitter Welder & Electronics)
- Shikhar Private ITI. (Electrician)
- Shradhalaya Janjati B.Ed College, (B.Ed & STC)
- Shree Vishwakarma ITI Center. (Fitter & Electrician)

== Post office ==
There are 3 post offices at Vikram Nagar, Anu Kiran & Bazar, and one Post Office franchisee at New Market.

== Religious places ==
- Shree Charbhuja Nath Mandir, Charbhuja
- Ram Mandir, Charbhuja
- Baroli Mandir, Baroli, Kota Road
- Shree Anokheraj Hanuman Mandir, Down Market
- Shree Tejaji Maharaj Mandir, Down Market
- Paleshwar Mahadev Mandir, Kota Road
- Mukteshwer Mahadev Mandir, Anu Kiran Colony
- Hateele Hanuman Mandir, Anu Kiran Colony
- Shani Dev Mandir, NTC Gate
- Shree Laxmi Narayan Mandir, NTC Gate
- Sai Baba Mandir, Plant Road
- Shani Vatika Mandir, Plant Road
- Manav Mandir, New Market
- Shree Ayappa Mandir, New Market
- Shri Ambe Mata Mandir, Picture Roll
- Shri Yogeshwar Mahadev Mandir, New Market
- Shree Vishwakarma Mandir, New Market
- Shiv Mandir, New Market
- Chambleshwar Mahadev Mandir, RAPS Colony
- Om Mahadev Mandir, RAPS Colony
- Shri Khatu Shyam Mandir Parisar, RAPS Colony
- Hanuman Tekri Mandir, Ghati
- Sarvjanik Ganesh Mandir, Down Market
- Asha Pura Mandir, Dam Road
- Durga Mata Mandir, Dam Road
- Kalika Mata Mandir, Dam Road
- Hanuman Mandir, Chaaran Basti
- Baba Ram Dev Ji Mandir, RAPS Colony
- Shiv & Hanuman Mandir, Canal Road, Down Market
- Nahar Singh Mata Mandir, Canal Road, Down Market
- Shree Datt Madareshwar Mahadev Mandir, Canal Road, Down Market
- Ganesh Mandir, Bariel
- Joganiya Mata Mandir, Bariel
- Narayan Puri Hanuman Mandir, Bariel
- Hinglaj Mata Mandir, Down Market
- Shiv Mandir, Township
- Digamber Jain Mandir, Down Market
- Shwetambar Jain Mandir, New Market
- Jama Masjid, Down Market
- NTC Masjid
- Madina Masjid, New Market
- United Church, NTC Gate
- Pentecostal Church of God, Down Market
- Gurudwara, New Market
- Buddh Vihar, Down Market
- Arya Samaj Mandir, New Market
- Brahma Kumaris Centre, Charbhuja & New Market
- Gayatri Vidya Peeth, Heavy Water Colony
- Paramhans Anandpur Ashram, New Market
- Radha Swami Satsang Bhawan, Kota Road
- Shabd Pratap Ashram, New Market

== Places of interest ==
=== Baroli Temple Complex ===
The Baroli Temples are located in Baroli Village in Rawatbhata tehsil. The complex of eight Temples is situated within a walled enclosure; an additional temple is about 1 km away. They are built in the Pratihara style of temple architecture dated to the tenth century A.D. All nine Temples are under the control of the Archaeological Survey of India for conservation and protection.

=== Rana Pratap Sagar Dam ===
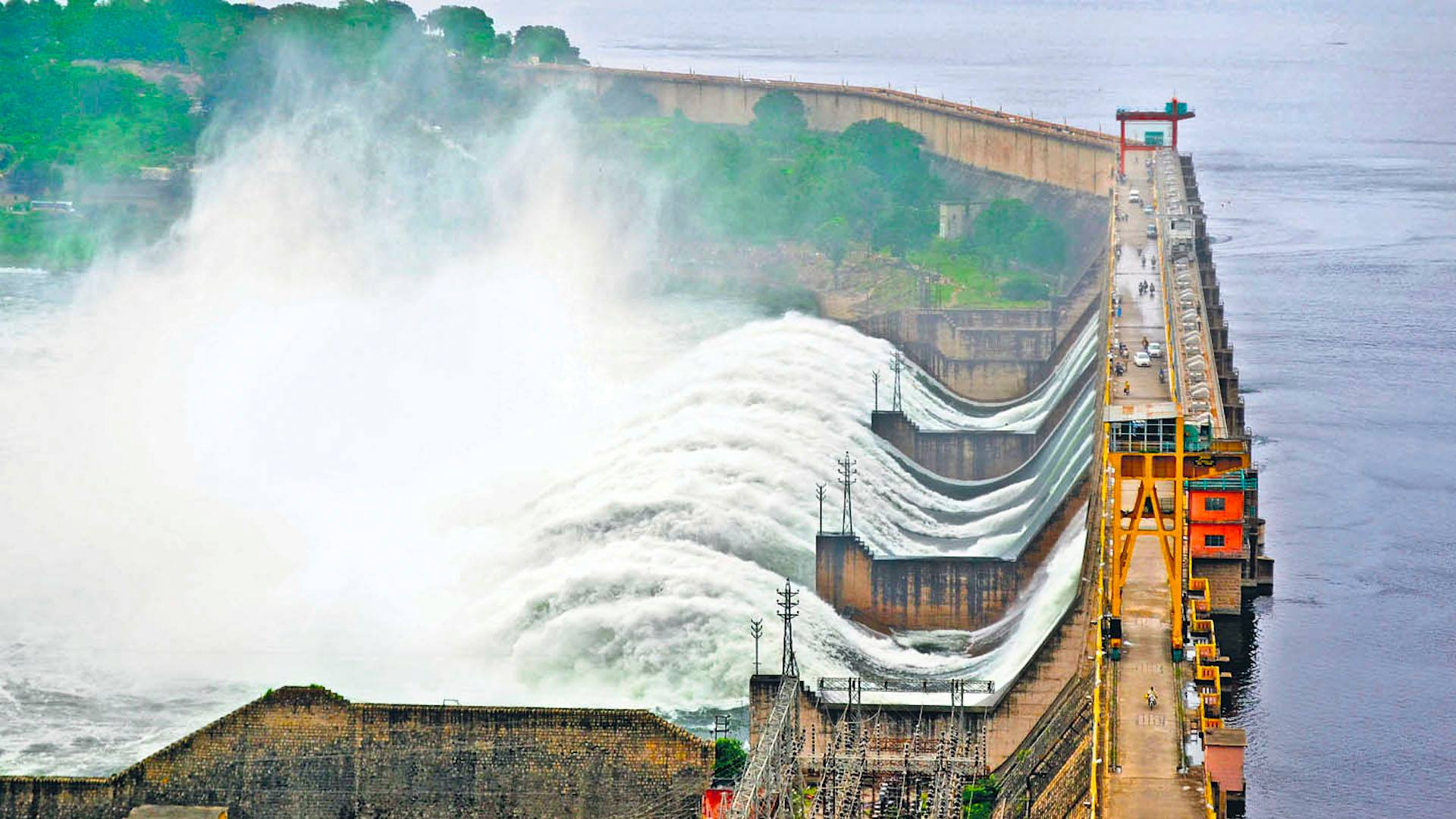
Rana Pratap Sagar Dam

Rana Pratap Sagar Dam on Chambal River is located near the city. The dam has power generation capability. It also supports a road connecting Rawatbhata to a nearby township, Vikram Nagar located on a small hill. On the top of the hill there is a large metal statue of Maharana Pratap, which is a view point over the city.

The Rana Pratap Sagar Dam is one among the four consequent dams constructed on the Chambal River which are Gandhi Sagar Dam, Rana Pratap Sagar Dam, Jawahar Sagar Dam and the Kota Barrage, the first three have electricity generation capacity while Kota Barrage is for irrigation.

The Rana Pratap Sagar Dam facilitates fishing activities in the nearby villages and is also responsible for supplying water to the Rajasthan Atomic Power Station for generation of electricity.

=== Bhainsrorgarh Wildlife Sanctuary ===
Bhainsrodgarh Wildlife Sanctuary is located at Saddle Dam Rawatbhata Chittorgarh. It has an area of 229.14 km^{2}. The principle species are dhokra and khair. other species include babool, ber, salar, khirni etc. the fauna includes: panther, wild boar, chinkara, fox, four horned antelope, civet hyena, the sambhar, the cheetal, chinkara, jackal, crocodiles etc. flora are dhok, salar, churel, butea. Many migratory birds are also spotted during the season.

=== Rajasthan Atomic Power Station ===
The Rajasthan Atomic Power Station is located at Rawatbhata. it currently has six pressurised heavy water reactor (PHWR) units operating with a total installed capacity of 1,180 MW.

The Nuclear Power Corporation of India Limited (NPCIL), the operator of the plant, is increasing the existing capacity by constructing two more reactors known as Units 7 and 8. (2×700MW=1400MW)

=== Heavy Water Plant ===
Owned and operated by the Department of Atomic Energy's (DAE) Heavy Water Board (HWB), the heavy water plant is integrated with the Rajasthan atomic power station for its supply of power and steam. An oil-fired steam generation plant was also added to ensure uninterrupted supply of steam during the shutdown periods. Canada began construction on the plant but ceased cooperation on the project after India's May 1974 test of a nuclear device. The Bhabha Atomic Research Centre(BARC) then completed designing the plant, which was originally expected to start operations in 1976. Problems associated with the accumulation of toxic chemicals created during the production of hydrogen sulphide gas, however, delayed commissioning until April 1985. These problems resulted in a cost escalation from 1.94 billion rupees to at least Rs. 7.2 billion rupees. Inadequate and unreliable supplies of power and steam from the RAPS reactors also plagued the plant and contributed to its low output. The two oil-fired boilers of the steam generation plant were added to alleviate the power supply problem. The heavy water plant uses the hydrogen sulphide water exchange process to produce up to 100mt of heavy water per year.

=== Nuclear Fuel Complex ===
Nuclear Fuel Complex, Hyderabad is setting up a green-field project Nuclear fuel Complex at Rawatbhata, Chittorgarh District, Rajasthan. This plant will meet the fuel requirements of 4 No 700 MWe PHWR reactors planned at Rawatbhata. The complex is spread over 190 hectares located on the banks of Rana Pratap Sagar, beside HWP-Rawatbhata. This plant is designed to produce 500 tonnes of 37 element PHWR fuel bundles per year. The project has received environmental clearance from MoEF (Ministry of Environment and Forest) in January 2014, financial clearance from the Union Cabinet in March 2014 with a sanctioned cost of INR 2,400 crores and siting clearance from AERB in May 2014, and construction work started in 2017

=== Kalakhet And R.A.P.S / H.W.P Colonies ===
The city of Rawatbhata is located in the lap of Aravali, surrounded by the forest. RAPS/HWP Colony, is divided into Vikram Nagar Township, Anu Asha, Anu Bhagya, Anu Chhaya, Anu Kiran, Anu Pratap, Anu Deep Anu Tara, Santab Colony. There are all facilities; street lights, electricity, water, parks, community centres, schools, hostel, shopping complex, sports complex, playgrounds, Post Offices, banks, dispensary, etc.

There is a private farm house Kalakhet 35 minutes from Rawatbhata, with many gardens and entertainment places. There are many types of trees and types of farming and a big swimming pool. The facilities attract a considerable number of tourists in the rainy season.

=== Parajhar Waterfall ===
Parajhar is a nearby waterfall. The underground water flowing in caves has carved statues and figures on the stones in the cave. Many people have died due accidents near the waterfall. It is near village called Parajhar gaon. This place is also known for historic cave-temple of Lord Shiv. During Mahashivratri a large festival is organised here. Water-fall and green surrounding is the attraction for peoples.

=== Saddle Dam ===
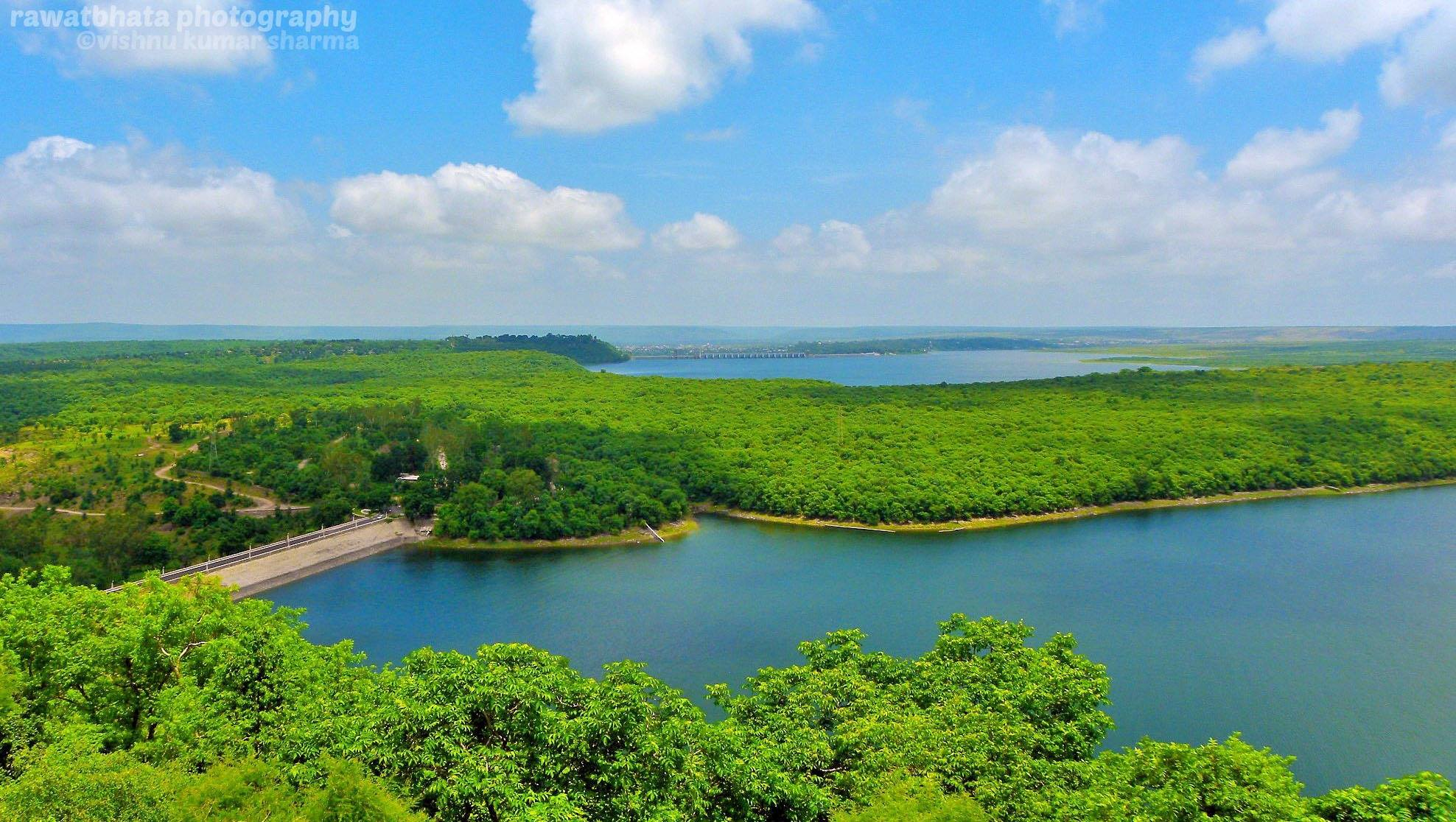
Saddle Dam

Saddle dam is a non-gated stone and mud dam to direct the water towards the main Rana pratap sagar dam and away from some villages, the catchment area of this dam fosters crocodiles and alligators.
