= Kailaras =

Kailaras कैलारस
- Town (Urban municipality)
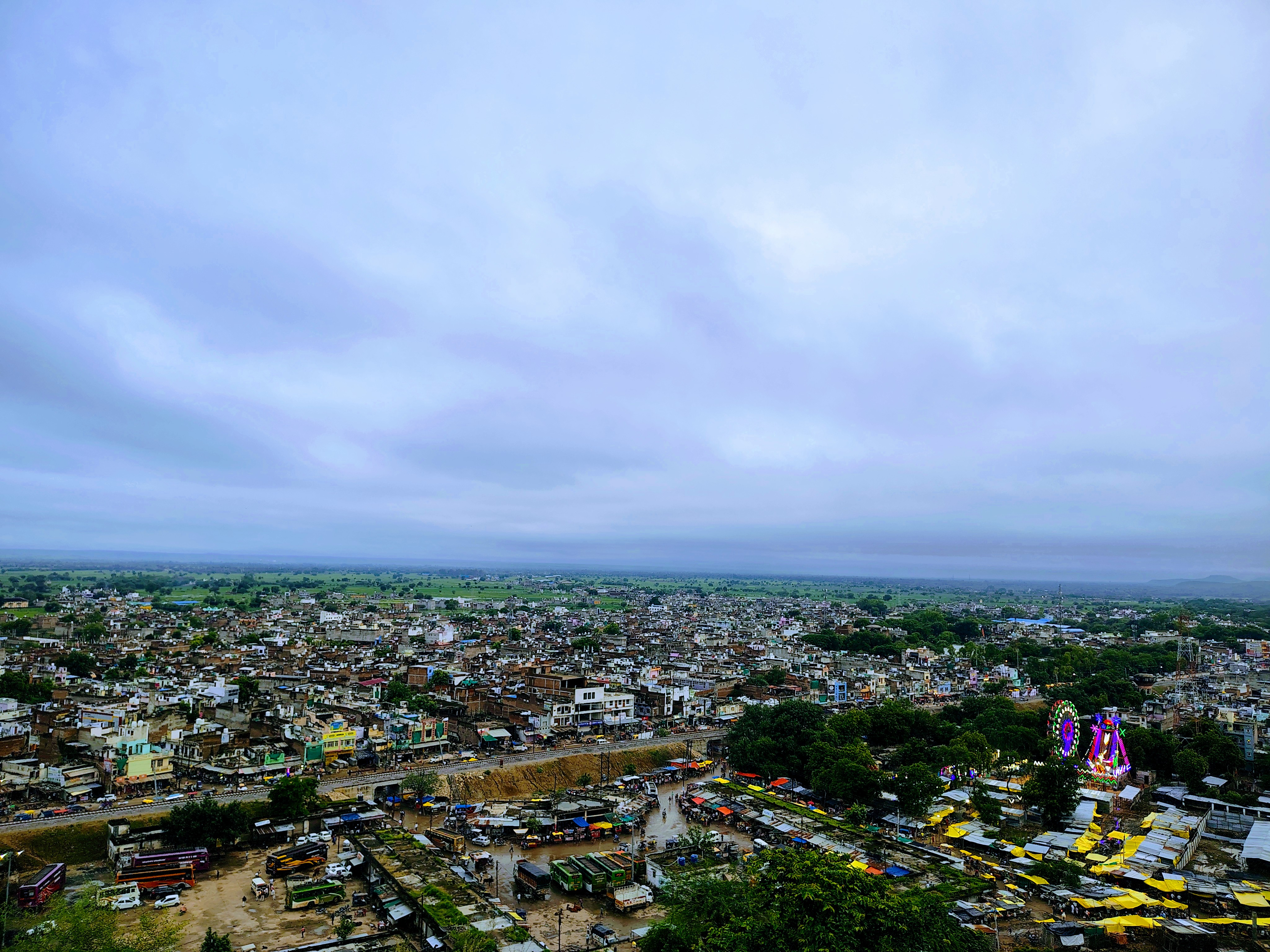

- Location in Madhya Pradesh, India Kailaras (India)
- Coordinates: 26.32°N 77.62°E
- Country: India
- State: Madhya Pradesh
- District: Morena

Government
  - Type: Nagar panchayat
- Elevation: 190 m (620 ft)

Population (2011)
  - Total: 13,936 male 11,984 female 25,920 total

Languages
  - Official: Hindi
- Time zone: UTC+5:30 (IST)
- PIN: 476224
- ISO 3166 code: IN-MP
- Vehicle registration: MP-06

Kailaras is a town and a nagar panchayat in Morena district in the Indian state of Madhya Pradesh. The name of the town is related to Kailash mountain due to the Temple of God Shankar, Alopi Shankar Temple which is situated on a hill 490 meters above sea level.

Kailaras is located on the bank of Kwari river. The Alopi Shankar temple located on the hill is an attraction point for many devotees who visit the city on the occasion of Mahashivratri.

== Geography ==
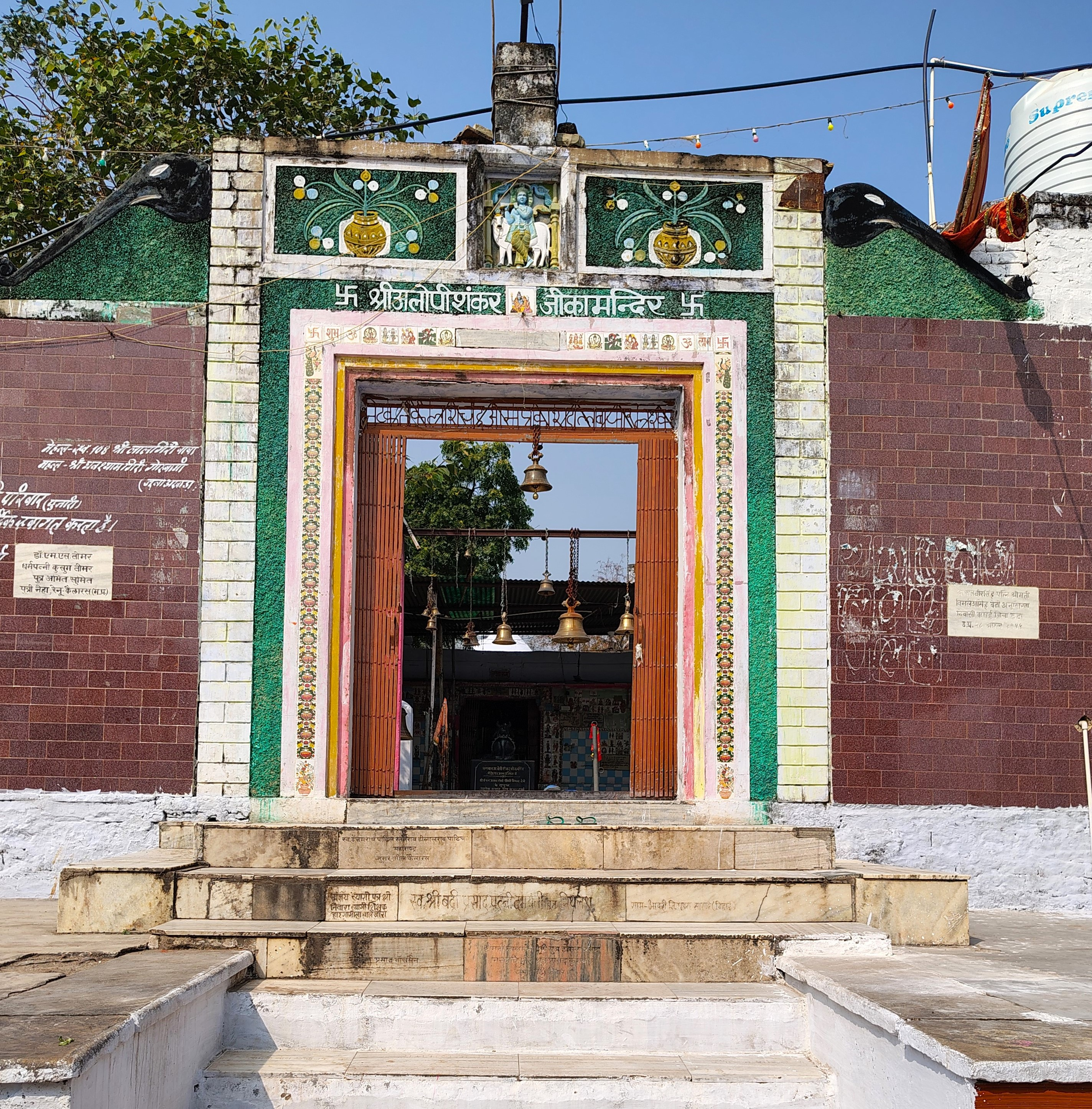
Alopi shankar temple

Kailaras is located at 26.32°N 77.62°E. It has an average elevation of 190 metres (623 feet). The Kwari river passes through the middle of Kailaras. The Sone and Chambal rivers run close to the town. There are several holy temples around Kailaras.

== Demographics ==
According to the Indian census, in 2011 Kailaras had a population of 25,920. Males constituted 54% of the population and females 46%. Kailaras had an average literacy rate of 73.9%, higher than the national average of 59.5%: male literacy was 73.9% and female literacy was 58.8%.

== Transport ==
=== Road ===
Kailaras is well connected with other major cities via road. National highway NH-552 passes through the town which connects it to Sheopur in west and Bhind in east. It is 84 kilometers from Gwalior. It is connected to Shivpuri via state highway which passes through Pahargarh.

It has a dedicated bus stand which provides the transport services to people through private bus companies.

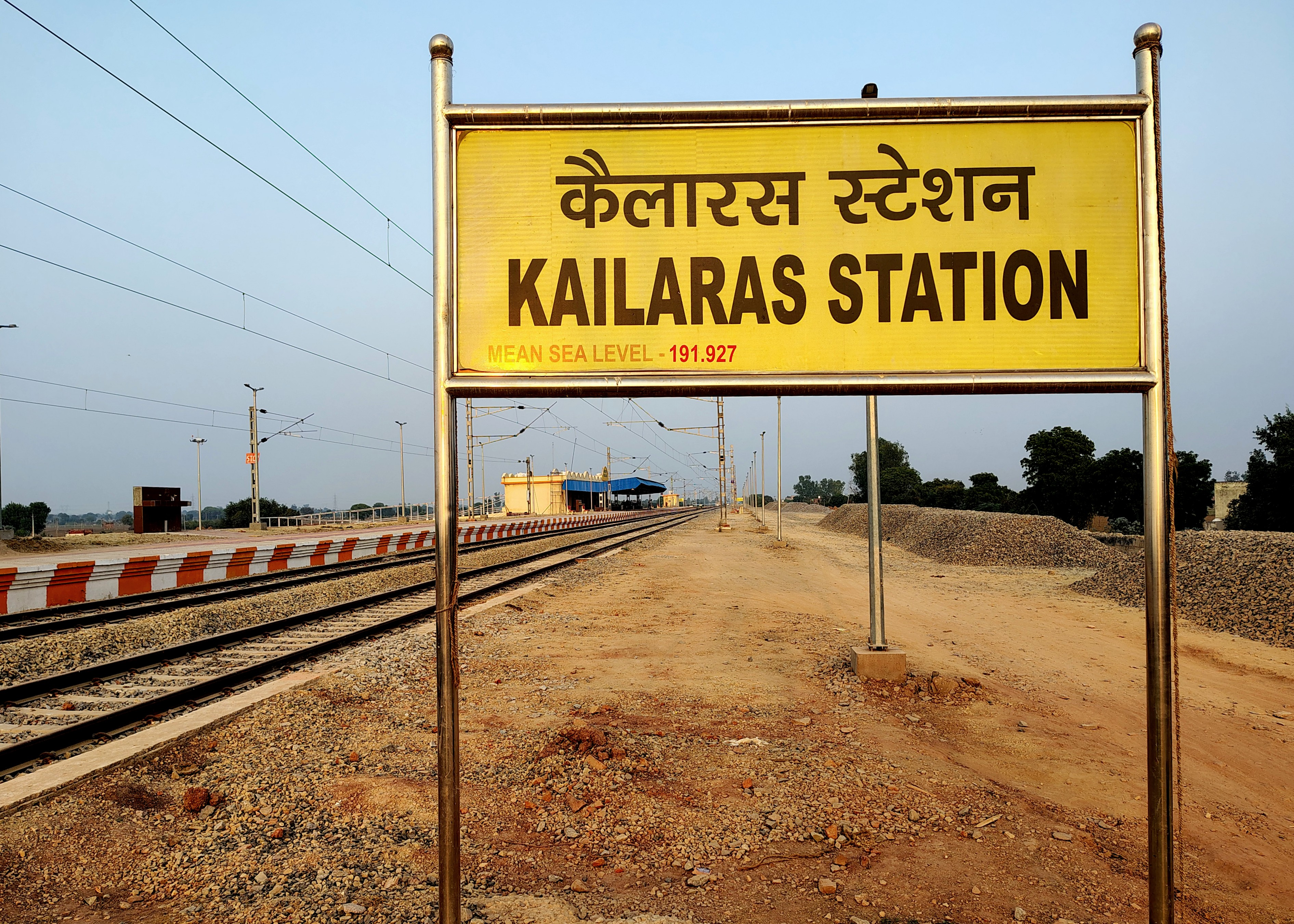
Railway station (KQS)

=== Rail ===
Kailaras railway station (KQS) of the North Central Railway zone serves the city. Kailaras has been connected via the historical Gwalior Light Railway line built during Gwalior State. It has now been converted to broad gauge line which connects it to Gwalior. Three trains run daily from Kailaras to Gwalior which cover distance of 71 kilometers. An extension of this railway line is in the construction phase which on completion will connect it to Kota in Rajasthan.

=== Air ===
The nearest airport to the city is Gwalior Airport which is 94 km away.

== Governance and administration ==
=== Governance & politics ===
Kailaras is governed by a municipal body whose elections are conducted every 5 years. It has more than a dozen wards which elect their own Parshad.

=== Revenue department ===
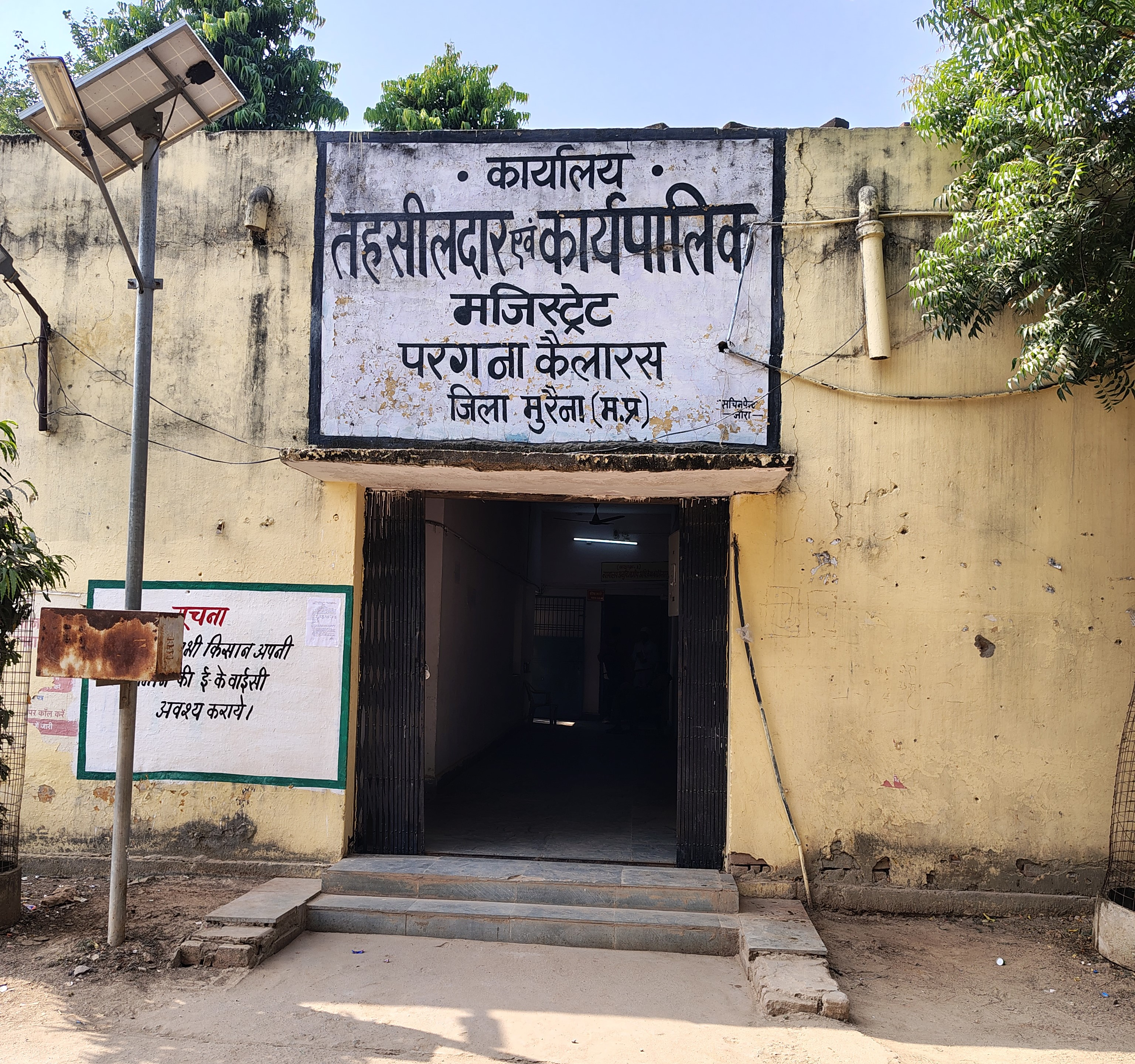
Tehsildar office

Kailaras has a unit of revenue department which is headed by a Tehsildar which deals with the matter related to land records.

=== Police ===
Kailaras has a police station serving the city of Kailaras and the nearby villages.

== Economy ==
Kailaras was famously known for its co-operative sugar factory which had a significant impact on the economy of the city. The majority of Kailaras’ population is self employed. Major banks like the State Bank of India, HDFC Bank, and the Central Bank of India have their branches along with some state level banks.

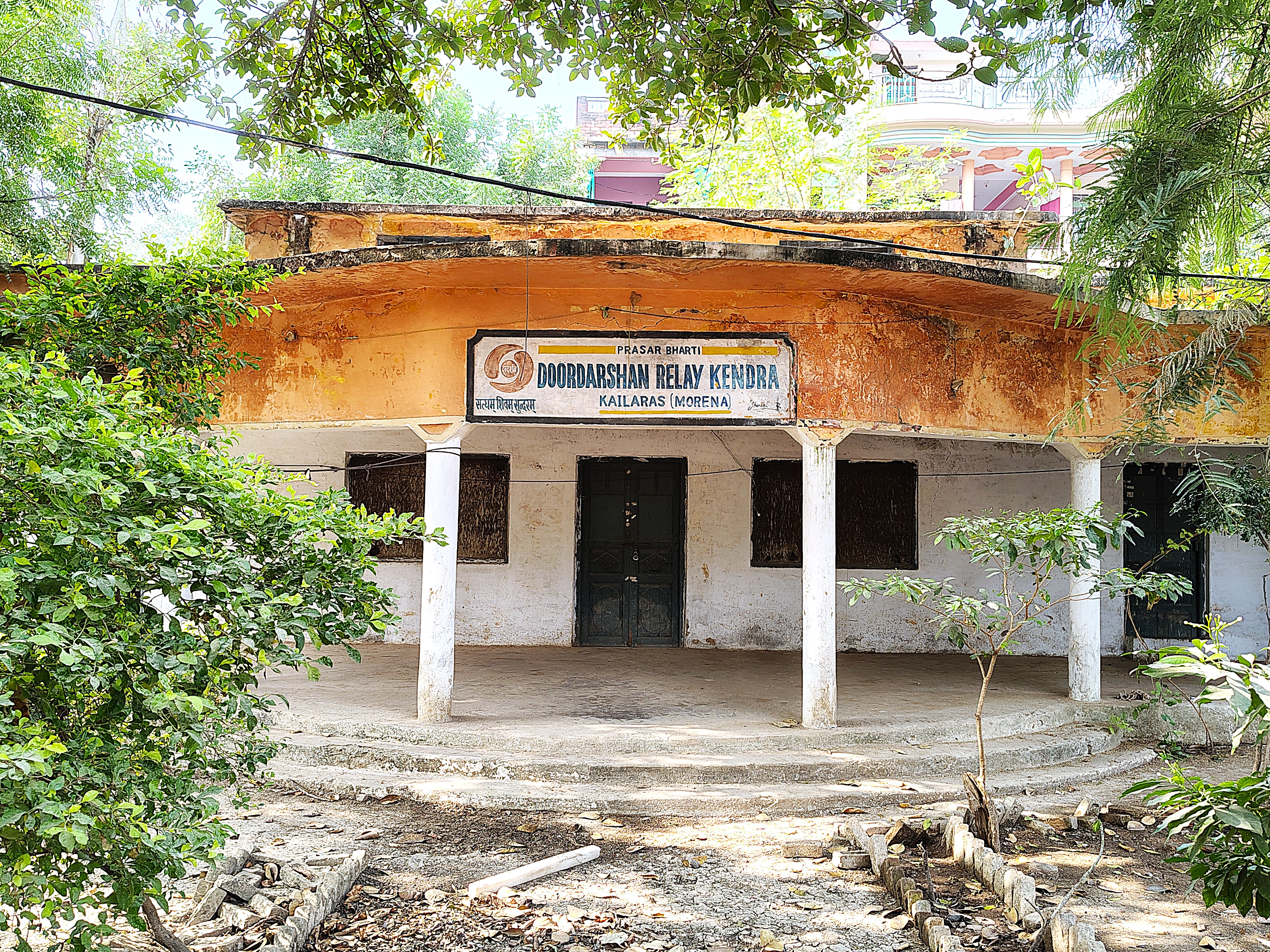
Doordarshan relay center

The Doordarshan relay kendra of Prasar Bharati has its office in the city. The city has a large complex called Anaaj Mandi which is used for the purchasing of food grains from the farmers. Many warehouses are also located near the city. Kailaras has one post office.

== Public amenities ==
=== Healthcare ===
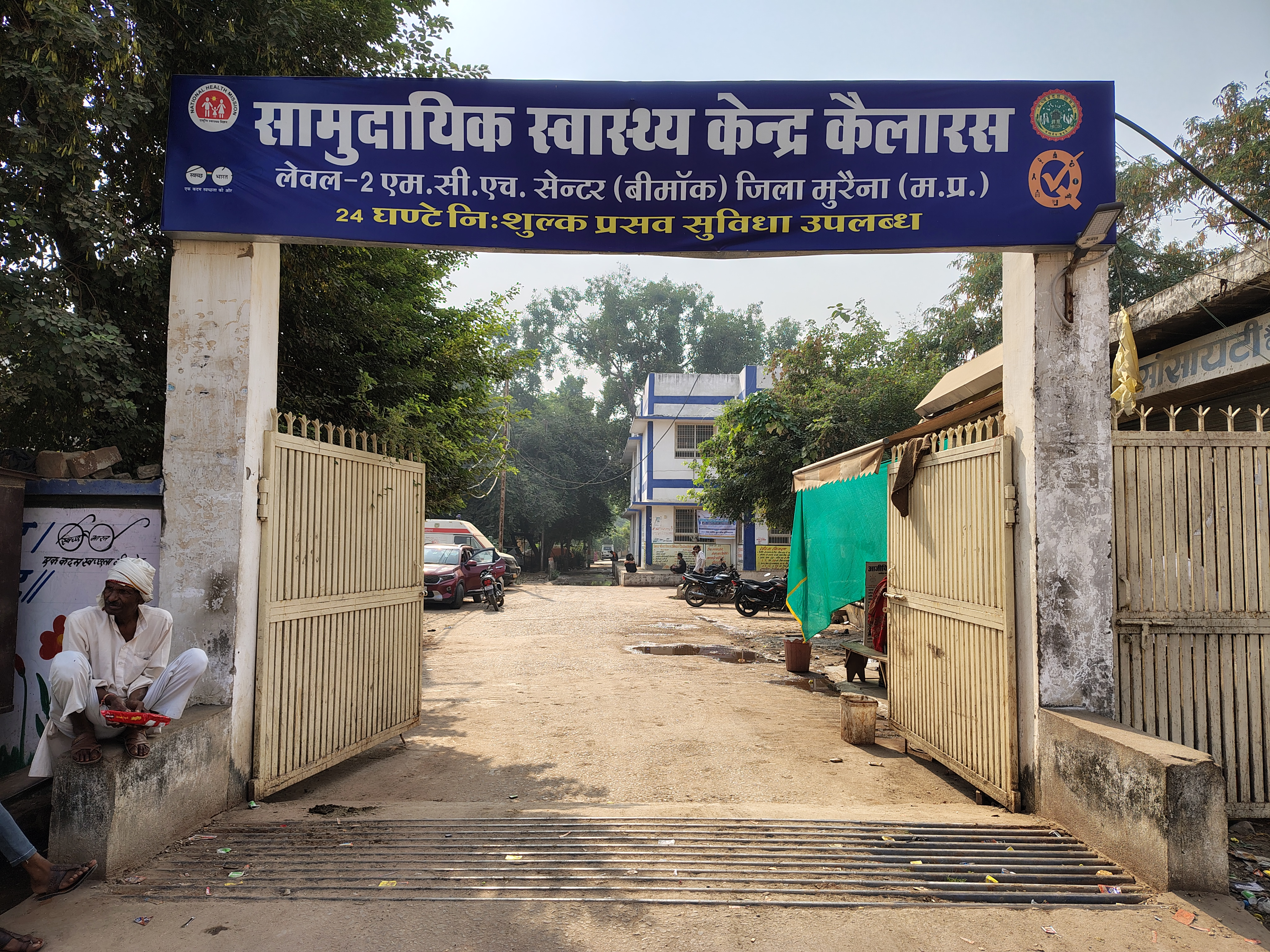
Government Hospital

Kailaras has a government health center which provides primary healthcare services to its residents. Along with this about a dozen doctors are also in the medical practice. Kailaras has many medical stores and pathology labs serving the people of nearby villages as well.

=== Education ===
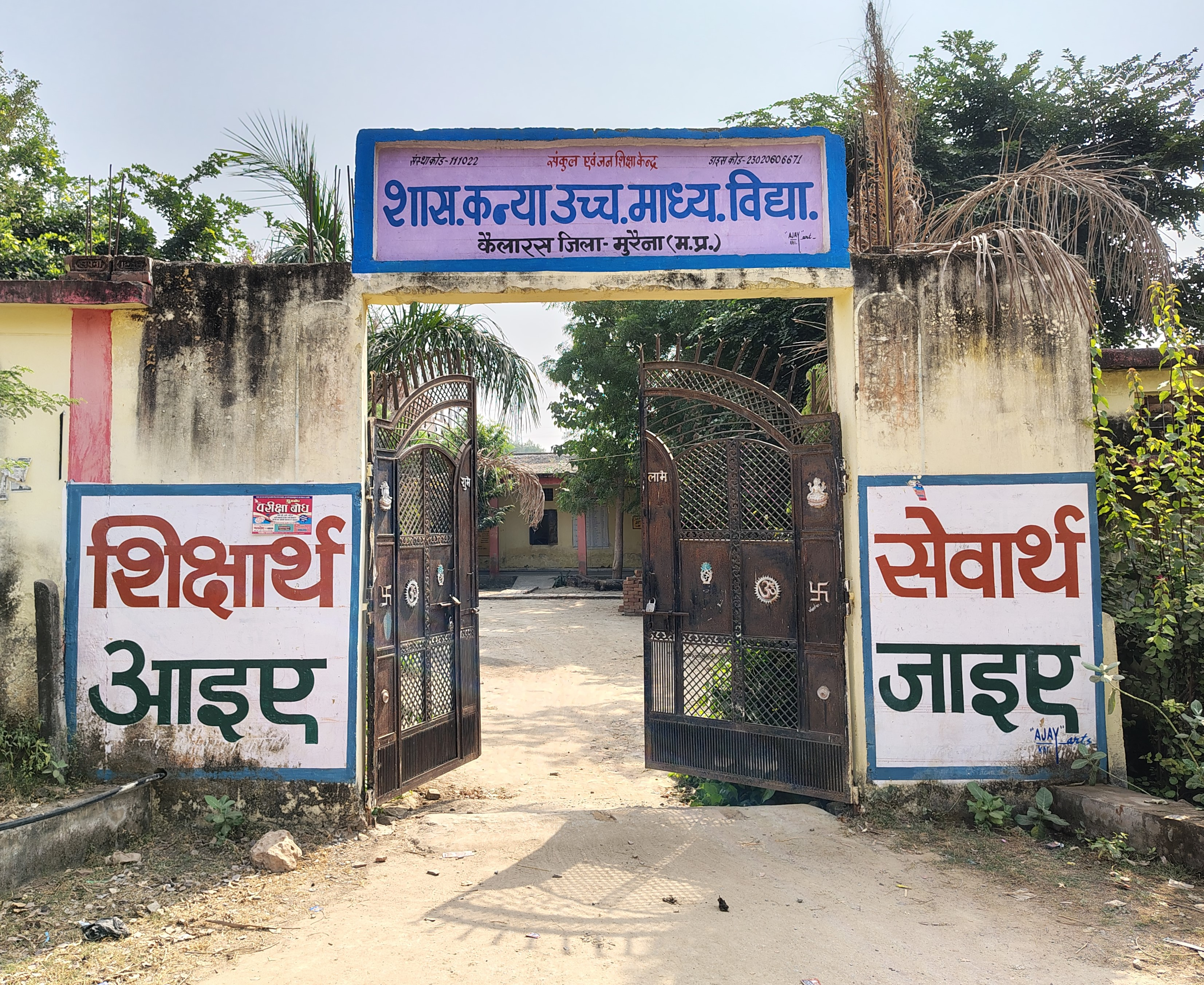
Government school

Kailaras has many private run schools along with the government schools. It has a few colleges for higher education which provide BA & BSc courses. It has many coaching centers which provide education to the students of nearby villages as well.

=== Parks ===
The Deendayal Upadhyay park located is the only public park in the city open very often.
