= Darrah Wildlife Sanctuary =

- IUCN category IV (habitat/species management area)
- Location within Rajasthan Location within India
- Interactive map of Darrah Wildlife Sanctuary
- Location: Kota district, Rajasthan, India
- Nearest city: Kota
- Coordinates: 24°50′N 75°58′E
- Area: 227.63 km^{2} (87.89 sq mi)
- Established: 1955
- Governing body: Rajasthan Forest Department

Darrah Wildlife Sanctuary is a protected area located in Kota and Jhalawar districts, in Southeast Rajasthan, India. It was declared a wildlife sanctuary in 1955 and later incorporated into the Mukundara Hills National Park in 2004. The sanctuary covers an area of about 227.63 km² and lies between the Chambal River and Mukundara Hills.

== History ==
During the princely period, the forest of Darrah was used as a royal hunting reserve by the rulers of Kota State. After independence, it was declared a sanctuary in 1955 to protect its dry deciduous forest and wildlife. In 2004, Darrah, along with nearby Jawahar Sagar and Chambal sanctuaries, was merged to form Mukundara Hills National Park.

== Flora and fauna ==
The sanctuary is characterized by dry deciduous forests with species such as Anogeissus pendula, Boswellia serrata and Butea monosperma. Wildlife includes species like Indian wolf, sloth bear, sambar deer, chinkara, and a variety of birds and reptiles.

== See also ==
- Mukundara Hills National Park
- List of wildlife sanctuaries of India
