= Kota Barrage =

Dam in Rajasthan, northern India

- Interactive map of Kota Barrage
- Location: Chambal River, Rajasthan, India
- Purpose: Irrigation
- Status: Operational
- Construction began: 1954
- Opening date: 1960
- Owner: Government of India

Dam and spillways
- Type of dam: Earthfill dam with concrete spillway
- Spillway type: Concrete spillway

Reservoir
- Total capacity: 99,000,000 m^{3} (3.5×10^{9} cu ft)

Kota Barrage is the fourth in the series of Chambal Valley Projects, located about 0.8 km upstream of Kota City in Rajasthan. Water released after power generation at Gandhi Sagar dam, Rana Pratap Sagar dam and Jawahar Sagar Dams, is diverted by Kota Barrage for irrigation in Rajasthan and in Madhya Pradesh through canals on the left and the right sides of the river. The work on this dam started in 1954 and was completed in 1960.

== Structure ==
The total catchment area of Kota Barrage is 27,332 km^{2}, of which the free catchment area below Jawahar Sagar Dam is just 137 km^{2}. The live storage is 99,000,000;cubic metres. It is an earthfill dam with a concrete spillway. The right and left main canals have a headworks discharge capacity of 188 and 42 m^{3}/s, respectively. The total length of the main canals, branches and distribution system is about 2,342 km, serving an area of 2,290 km^{2} of CCA. 50% of the water intercepted at Kota Barrage has been agreed to be diverted to Madhya Pradesh for irrigation. The barrage operates 19 gates to control flow of flood and canal water downstream, and serves as bridge between parts of Kota on both side of the river.

== Tourism ==
The massive flow/froth of water during opening of gates in monsoon season — and accompanying vibration of bridge — are particular attraction among locals. Though in past, mis- or non-communication about the discharge of water to residents near river bank has resulted in the loss of lives of people engaged in swimming or washing activities downstream.

Other places worth visiting nearby include Kansua temple with a four faced Shiva Lingam, Bhitria Kund, Adhar Shila, Budh Singh Bafna Haveli and Yatayat Park.
