= Kwari River =

River in India

Coordinates: 26.43015°N 79.18599°E

The Kwari River, also known as the Kuwari or Kunwari River, flows through the Sheopur, Morena and Bhind districts of Madhya Pradesh in central India. The total length of the river is approx 220 km.

== Geography ==
The river originates near the village of Devpura. The Kwari is a tributary of the Sindh River, draining into the Sindh at the Etawah District. The Sindh River joins the Yamuna River further downstream at Pachnada. The towns of Bijeypur and Kailaras are located along its bank. The river has no tributaries.

The Kwari Bridge was constructed in 1962.

The total catchment of the river is 23 999 km2.

== Culture ==
The river was mentioned in the epic Mahabharata.

Some upstream farmers have been accused of diverting water flows leading to water scarcity downstream.
