= Bhareh =

- town
- Location in Uttar Pradesh, India
- Coordinates: 26°29′58″N 79°14′55″E
- Country: India
- State: Uttar Pradesh
- District: Auraiya

Languages
  - Official: Hindi
- Time zone: UTC+5:30 (IST)
- Vehicle registration: UP-
- Nearest city: Auraiya

Bhareh is a town in Etawah district in the state of Uttar Pradesh, India.

This is situated on the confluence of Yamuna and Chambal rivers. There is an old fort belonging to the Sengar clan.
