= Pachnada =

The Pachnada is an area near Sindous at the border of Jalaun district, Etawah district and Auraiya district of Uttar Pradesh state, India. It is also near the border of Bhind district of Madhya Pradesh state, where tourists can witness the confluence of five rivers, Kunwari, Pahuj, Yamuna, Chambal and Sind. This area is a rich habitat for dolphins.

Pahuj River is a river flowing in Bhind district of Madhya Pradesh in central India. It is a tributary of the Sindh River, which joins the Yamuna River in Jalaun Uttar Pradesh state, just after the Chambal River joins the Yamuna River.

Kwari River (also spelled as Kuwari or Kunwari River) is a river flowing in Morena district, Bhind district of Madhya Pradesh in central India. It is a tributary of Sindh River and joins it in Etawah district; the Sindh River in turn immediately joins the Yamuna River.

The Sindh is a river of Madhya Pradesh state in central India. The Sindh originates on the Malwa Plateau in Vidisha District, and flows northwest through Madhya Pradesh to join the Yamuna River in Etawah district Uttar Pradesh state, just after the Chambal River confluence with the Yamuna River. The Pahuj River and Kwari River are its tributaries. Yamuna, the biggest tributary of Ganga, later joins its parent river at Allahabad.

The confluence of Yamuna and Chambal up to the confluence of Sindh and Yamuna locally known as Pachnada, presents an extensive view of Sylvan beauty during the rainy season and also in the winters, but it turns into an arid expanse during the summers. One can see dolphins during this time.
