= Rana Pratap Sagar Dam =

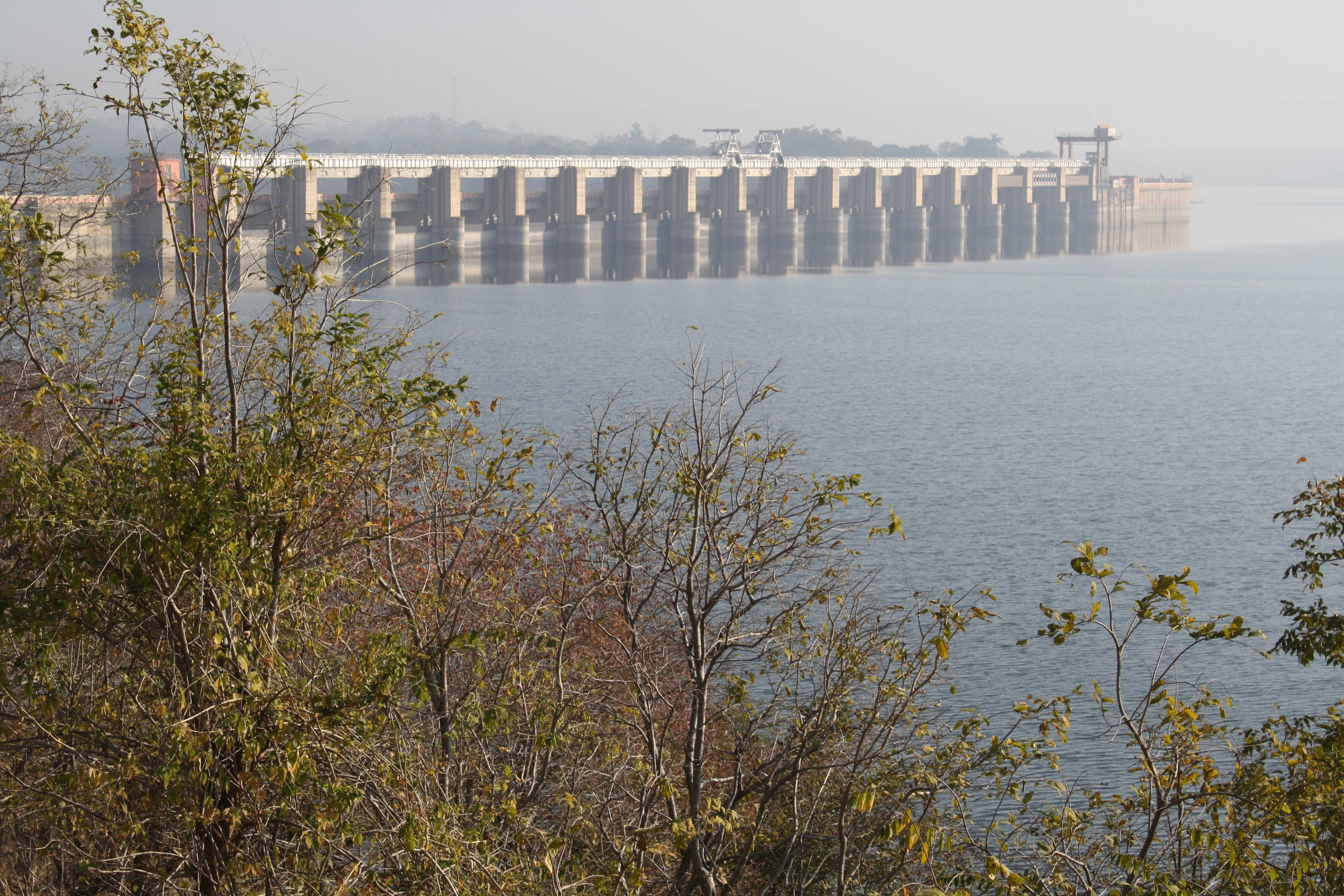
- Upstream view of Rana Pratap Sagar Dam

- Location within Rajasthan Location within India
- Official name: Rana Pratap Sagar DamDam Type –Gravity with ogee shaped spill way having 50' x 44' x 11 Nos. crest gates.
- Location: Rawatbhata, Chittorgarh District, Rajasthan
- Coordinates: 24°55′04″N 75°34′53″E
- Construction began: 1953
- Opening date: 1970
- Construction cost: Rs. 4065 million
- Operators: Water Resources Department, Rajasthan, Rajasthan Rajya Vidyut Utpadan Nigam Limited (RVUNL)

Dam and spillways
- Impounds: Chambal River, a tributary of Yamuna River
- Height: 53.8 metres (177 ft)
- Length: 1,143 metres (3,750 ft)

Reservoir
- Creates: Multipurpose
- Total capacity: 2,898,000,000 cubic metres (102.36 tmc ft)
- Active capacity: 1,566,520,000 cubic metres
- Catchment area: 956 km^{2} (369 sq mi) (intercepted)
- Surface area: 198.29 km^{2} (76.56 sq mi)

The Rana Pratap Sagar Dam is a gravity masonry dam of 53.8 metres (177 ft) height built on the Chambal River at Rawatbhata in Rajasthan in India. It is part of integrated scheme of a cascade development of the river involving four projects starting with the Gandhi Sagar Dam in the upstream reach (48 kilometres (30 mi) upstream) in Madhya Pradesh and the Jawahar Sagar Dam on the downstream (28 kilometres (17 mi) downstream) with a terminal structure of the Kota Barrage (28 kilometres (17 mi) further downstream) in Rajasthan for irrigation.

The direct benefit from the dam is hydropower generation of 172 MW (with four units of 43 MW capacity each) at the dam toe powerhouse adjoining the spillway, with releases received from the Gandhi Sagar Dam and the additional storage created at the dam by the intercepted catchment area. The estimated generation potential of 473.0 GWh of generation has been exceeded in most years since its commissioning. The power station was officially declared open on 9 February 1970 by Indira Gandhi, the then Prime Minister of India. The dam and power plant are named after the warrior Maharaja Rana Pratap of Rajasthan.

== Geography ==
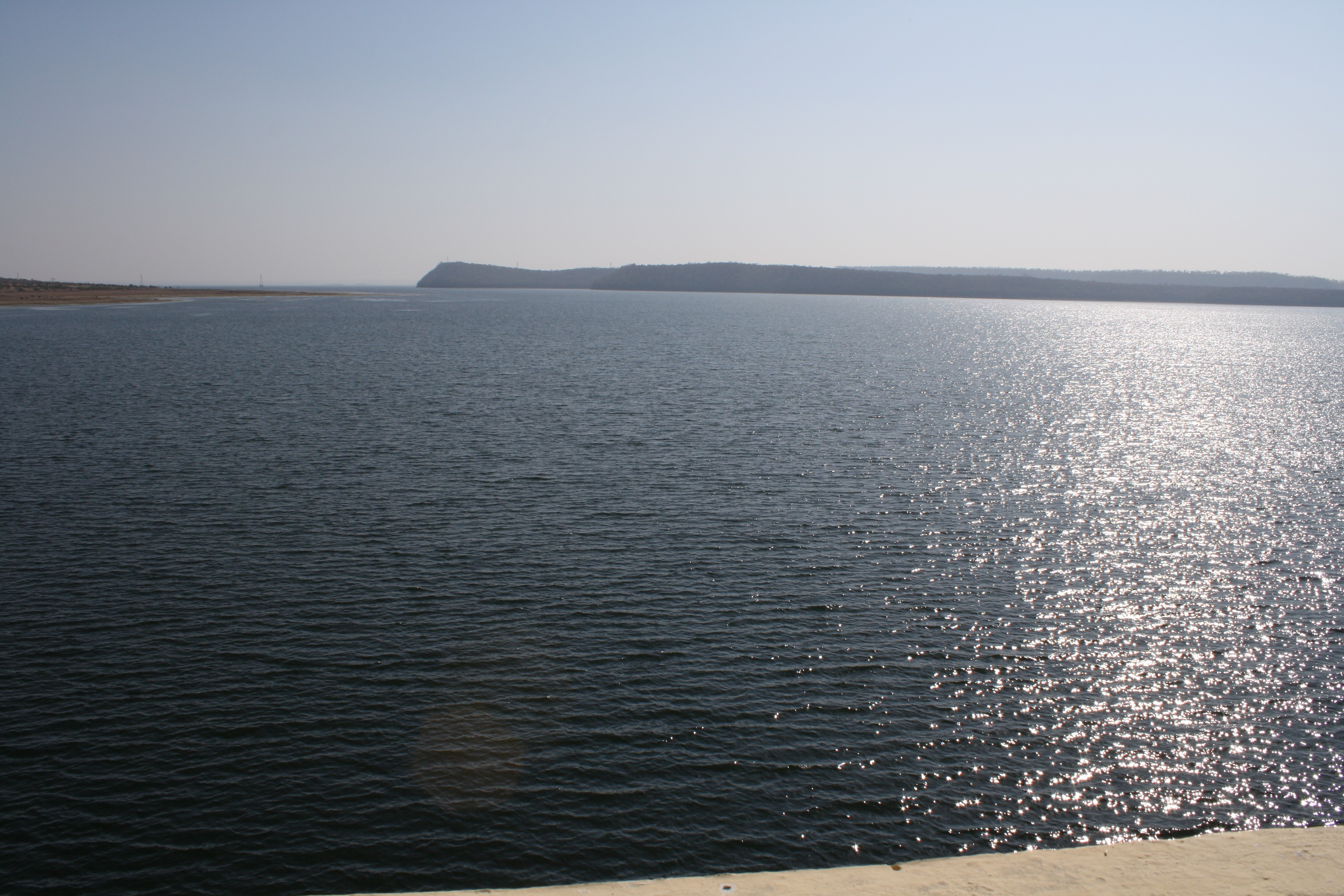
Reservoir expanse of Rana Pratap Sagar Dam

The dam is located on the Chambal River near Rawatbhata in Rajasthan. The dam drains a total catchment area of 24,864 km^{2} (9,600 sq mi), of which only 956 km^{2} (369 sq mi) are in Rajasthan. The free catchment intercepted at this dam site, below Gandhi Sagar Dam, is 2,280 km^{2} (880 sq mi).

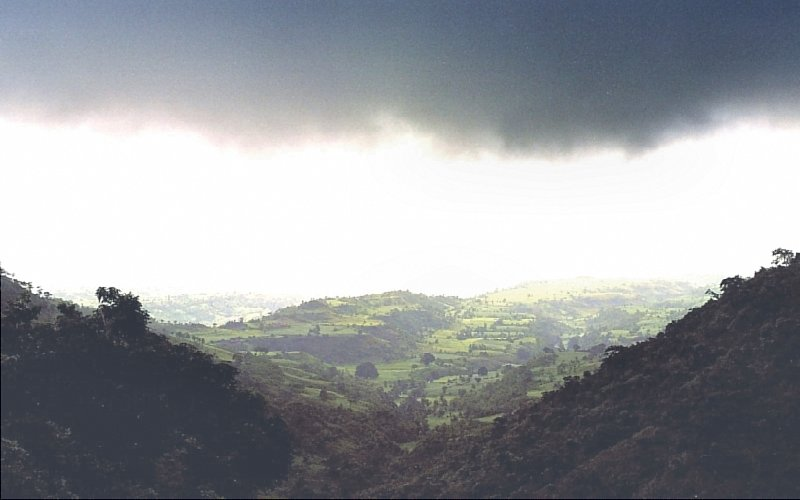
The Vindhya Range of hills where the Chambal River originates

The Chambal River (known in ancient times as the Charmavati River), a perennial river, which is first tapped at the Gandhi Sagar dam as part of its cascade development, raises in the Vindhya Range of hills at an elevation of 853 metres (2,799 ft), south of Mhow (15 kilometres (9.3 mi) west-southwest of Mhow). It flows north-northeast through Madhya Pradesh, runs for a time through Rajasthan, then forms the boundary between Rajasthan and Madhya Pradesh before turning southeast to join the Yamuna River in Uttar Pradesh state. Its total length from source up to the confluence with the Yamuna River near Etawah at elevation (122 metres (400 ft) is 900 kilometres (560 mi). It flows in a north–south direction for about (360 kilometres (220 mi) in Madhya Pradesh and then enters Rajasthan at Chaurasigarh about 96 kilometres (60 mi) south east from Kota and eventually joins the Yamuna River in Uttar Pradesh near Etawah. The river reach of 96 kilometres (60 mi) from 344 kilometres (214 mi) to 440 kilometres (270 mi) from its source is a deep gorge section and further downstream there are plains. The Gandhi Sagar Dam is located in the middle reach of the gorge section of the river and affords good storage facility. For the next (48 kilometres (30 mi), the river flows through the Kundal Plateau, and the Rana Pratap Sagar Dam is constructed at the lower end of this reach, about (1.6 kilometres (0.99 mi) upstream of Chulia Falls. Here again, the topography permits fairly good storage upstream of the dam.

The river is drained by a rainfed catchment with major part of the catchment receiving an average rainfall of 860 millimetres (34 in), with temperature variation from a maximum of 40 °C (104 °F) to a minimum of 2 °C (36 °F), and with the relative humidity lying between 30 and 90% during the year.

The nearest railway station is at Kota, which is at a road distance of 59 kilometres (37 mi), from the dam.

== History ==
An integrated development planning was launched in 1953, envisaging development of the irrigation and hydropower potential (386 MW from the three power stations) as part of the Chambal River Valley Development. This planning was done during the First Five-Year Plan, 1951–1956 launched by the Government of India, after India attained independence in August 1947; the Chambal River with annual flow of 3,400,000 acre-feet (4.2 km^{3}) had till then remained untapped from any major developmental works.) The planning involved utilization of the hydropower potential of the river to harness the drop of 625 metres (2,051 ft) available in the Chambal River from its source in Mhow in Madhya Pradesh up to the Kota city, which marks the exit of the river from its gorge section into the plains in Rajasthan.

While the first stage involved construction of the Gandhi Sagar Dam for creation of storage of 7,322,000,000 cubic metres and power generation and utilization of the stored waters for irrigation from the Kota Barrage in Rajasthan was initiated in 1953–54, the second stage development involved utilization of the water released from the Gandhi Sagar Dam through a second dam structure (48 kilometres (30 mi), downstream at Rawatbhata in Chittorgarh District of Rajasthan envisaging additional storage from the intermediate catchment below Gandhi Sagar Dam. Additional storage at this dam also envisaged increase of irrigation benefits from the Kota barrage from Stage I potential of 445,000 hectares (1,100,000 acres) to 567,000 hectares (1,400,000 acres). The main benefit at this dam envisaged power generation at a dam toe powerhouse with installation of power plants of 172 MW capacity with four turbo generators of 43 MW capacity each. The project was completed in 1970. The power generated at this dam is shared equally with Madhya Pradesh, as the Gandhi Sagar dam provides the stored waters for utilization at this dam.

== Description ==
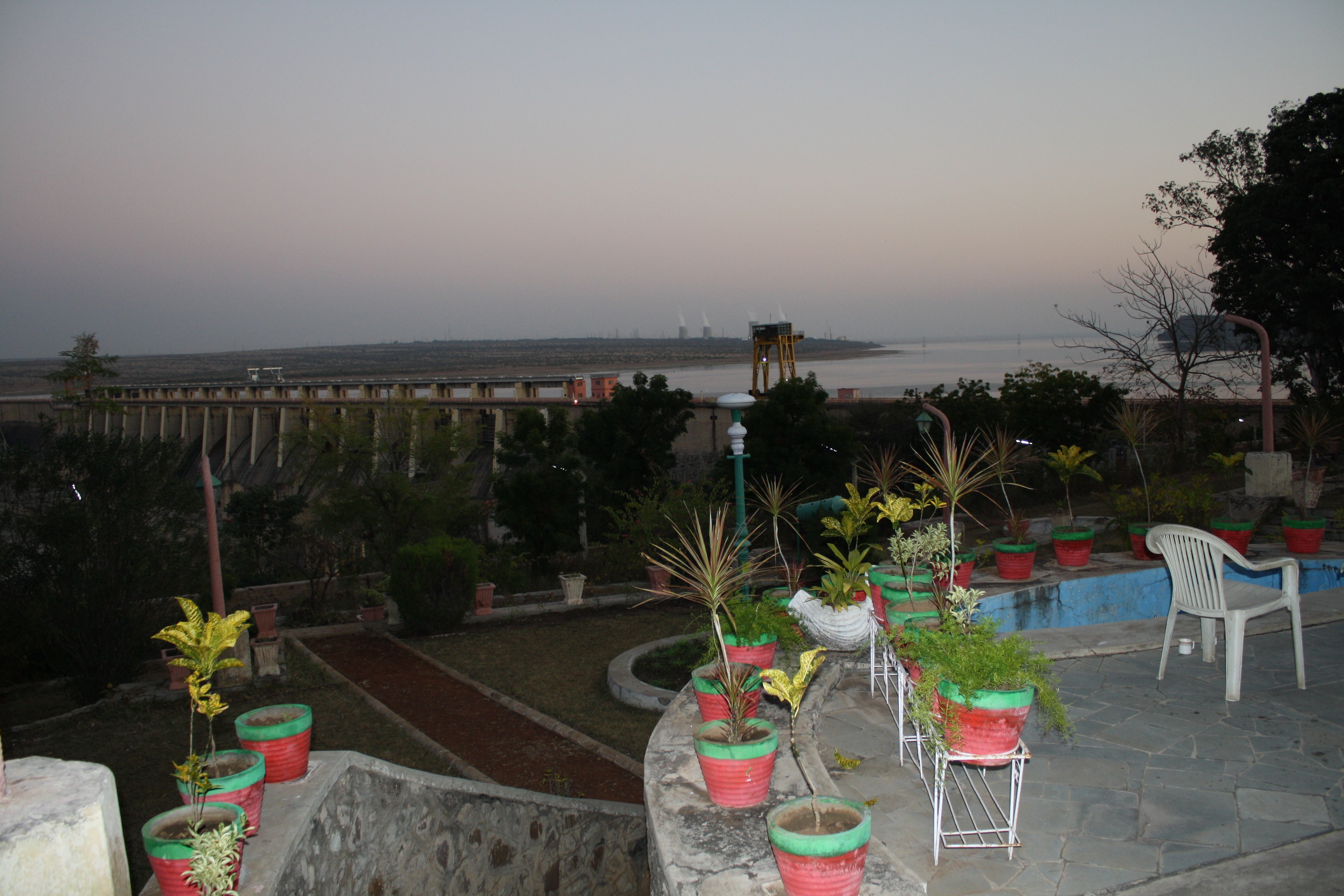
View of Rana Pratap Sagar Dam from the recreational area

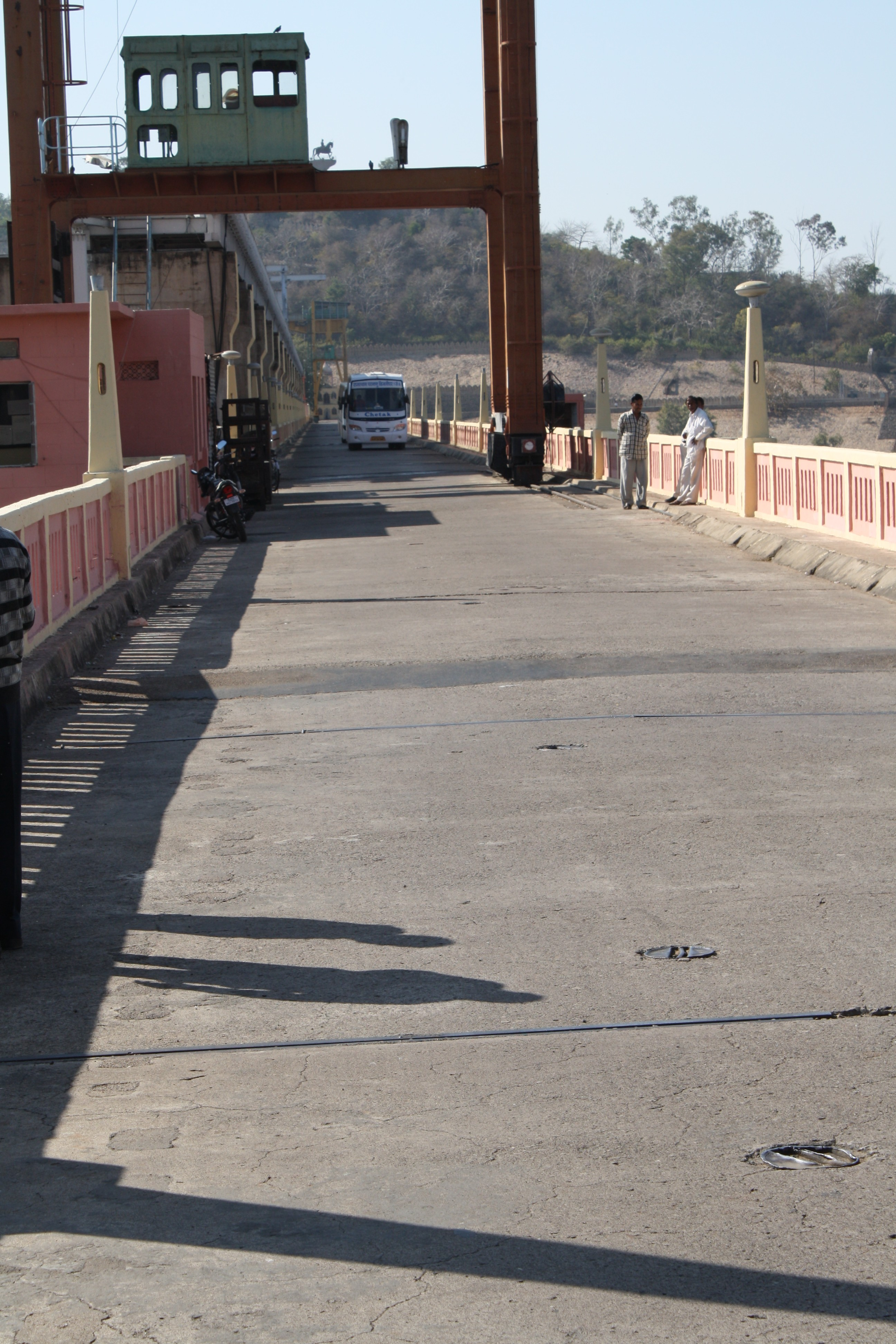
Rana Pratap Sagar Dam Road on the top of the dam

The Rana Pratap Sagar Dam is a straight masonry gravity structure of 53.8 m (177 ft) height with a length of 1,143 m (3,750 ft). The reservoir stretch is -km and its surface area at the Full Reservoir Level is 198.29 km^{2} (76.56 sq mi). The dam has created a storage capacity (Gross Storage) of 2,898,000,000 cubic metres out of which the utilizable storage (Live Storage) is 1,566,520,000 cubic metres. The dam is designed to pass a designed flood discharge of 18,408.00 m^{3}/s through a spillway structure which is provided with 17 crest gates of 18.3 mx8.53m size above the spillway crest for the purpose. In addition, sluice gates have also been provided in the body of the dam at lower levels to remove silt deposited in the dam.

The power house is located on the left side of the spillway and consists of 4 units of 43 MW each, with firm power generation of 90 MW at 60% load factor. The stored water from the reservoir including the water discharged from the powerhouse of the upper reservoir (The Gandhi Sagar Reservoir) is utilized for power generation over an operating head range of 189 ft (58 m) (maximum) to 152 ft (46 m) (minimum). The water conductor system consists of penstock pipes (of 20 ft (6.1 m) diameter) from the dam to feed the four power plants (turbo-generators) and a tailrace tunnel of 1,450 m (4,760 ft) length and diameter 12 m (39 ft), to lead the water back to the Chambal River. Rajasthan State has a 50% share in the power generation of this station.

The project was built at a cost of Rs 4065 million including the Power plant which involved a cost of Rs 1474 million. Funds were provided under the Colombo Plan to import the equipment from Canada. At a formal inauguration held on 9 February 1970, the project was dedicated to the nation. The power plant was transferred to the Rajasthan State Electricity Board now renamed as Rajasthan Rajya Vidyut Utpadan Nigam Limited. According to energy generation statistics reported for the period 1968–2008, the average generation was 480.6 GWh against originally planned generation of 473 GWh. Along with the Rajasthan Atomic Power Station which is located near the Rawatbhata dam and the Rana Pratap Sagar Power plant contribute to the stability of the Northern Regional Power Grid of the country.

Reservoir

The reservoir water stretch from the dam extends up to the Gandhi Sagar Dam. The Rana Pratap Sagar Reservoir, the wetland created by the dam, is identified as one of the important aquatic areas with suitable vegetation for bird life proliferation, which needs enumeration for its bird species. The reservoir area supports considerable population of resident and migratory birds.

== See also ==
- Maharana Pratap Sagar
