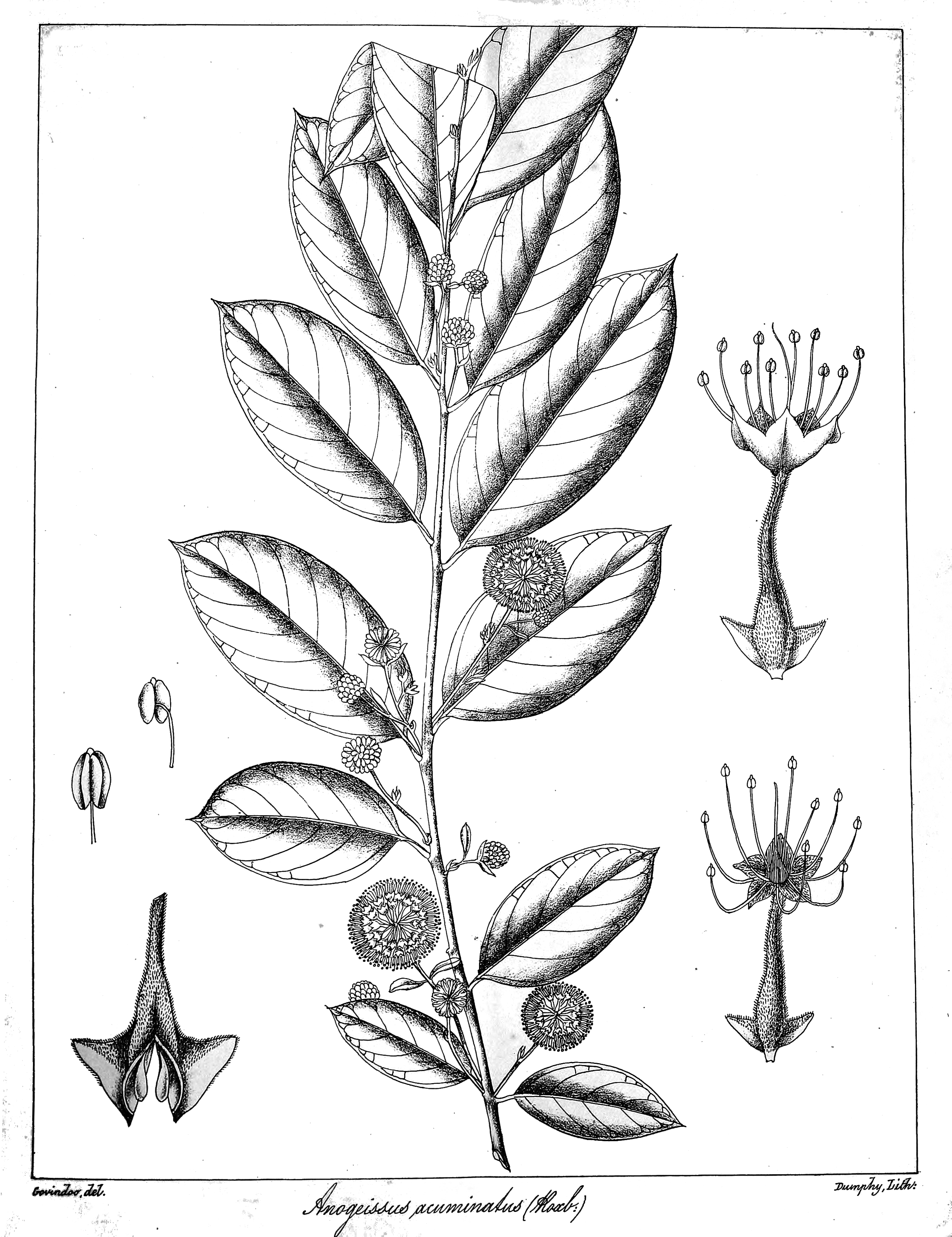
- Botanical illustration

Scientific classification
- Kingdom: Plantae
- Clade: Tracheophytes
- Clade: Angiosperms
- Clade: Eudicots
- Clade: Rosids
- Order: Myrtales
- Family: Combretaceae
- Genus: Terminalia
- Species: T. pendula

Binomial name
- Terminalia pendula (Edgew.) Gere & Boatwr.

Synonyms
- List: Anogeissus pendula Edgew. (homotypic); Anogeissus acuminata (Roxb. ex DC.) Wall. ex Guill. & Perr.; Anogeissus fischeri M.G.Gangop. & Chakrab.; Anogeissus harmandii Pierre; Anogeissus hirta Wall.; Anogeissus phillyreifolia Van Heurck & Müll.Arg.; Anogeissus pierrei Gagnep.; Anogeissus tonkinensis Gagnep.; Conocarpus acuminatus Roxb. ex DC.; Conocarpus hirtus Buch.-Ham. ex Wall.; Conocarpus lanceolatus B.Heyne ex Wall.; Terminalia phillyreifolia (Van Heurck & Müll.Arg.) Gere & Boatwr.

= Terminalia pendula =

Species of flowering plant

Terminalia pendula is an Asian species of tree in the family Combretaceae. It is a medium-sized tree found in both primary and secondary tropical and sub-tropical forests. It is recorded from India to China, south to Thailand and Vietnam. It may be one of the dominant species of seasonal tropical forests of Vietnam. In Yunnan it is found in rocky limestone areas, near sea level to 700 m (2,300 ft). Besides timber uses, the bark of this species has a high tannin content.

== Taxonomy ==
A 2017 article embedded genera including Anogeissus into Terminalia; there are now three varieties of this species:

1. T. pendula var. fischeri (M.Gangop. & Chakrab.) Chakrab. & Anand Kumar - Indian subcontinent
2. T. pendula var. pendula - the nominate variety, formerly known as Anogeissus acuminata; Vietnamese: chò nhai or râm
3. T. pendula var. phillyreifolia (Van Heurck & Müll.Arg.) Chakrab. & Anand Kumar - was T. phillyreifolia (Van Heurck & Müll.Arg.) Gere & Boatwr. - from Myanmar where the variety may be called "buttontree" or yon (from Burmese: ရုံး; MLCTS: rum:; IPA: [jṍʷ]).

== Description ==
In China, where it is known as 榆绿木 (yu lü mu), these trees grow to 20 m (66 ft) tall with a trunk to 1 m (3 ft 3 in) in diameter at breast height. In Myanmar they may be larger: up to 30 m (98 ft) tall and up to 2.7 m (8 ft 10 in) girth, with a straight and cylindrical trunk. The branchlets are slightly pendent, slender, together with petioles and leaf blades golden villous when young. The petioles are cylindrical, 2–6 mm and the leaf blades are lanceolate to narrowly so, 40-80 × 10–30 mm long, grey-green on the back and pilose mostly in the axils of lateral veins. They are green and glabrous to glabrescent on the leaf surface. The leaf base is narrowed or obtuse, the apex acuminate. There are five to seven inconspicuous lateral veins in pairs.

The flowers are numerous sessile on flower heads 9–13 mm in diameter; bracts are easily deciduous and linear, 4–5 mm long. The calyx tubes are approximately 5 mm long, abaxially yellow pubescent, densely so on ovary and tubular part, and more sparsely so on the cup-shaped part. The filaments are 3–4 mm long. The fruits are approximately 6 × 5 mm long including a "beak". They are ferruginous pubescent distally and on the beak.

Terminalia pendula flowers between February and March in Bangladesh and Thailand.
