= List of State Protected Monuments in Rajasthan =

This is a list of State Protected Monuments as officially reported by and available through the website of the Archaeological Survey of India in the Indian state Rajasthan. In 2016, 227 State Protected Monuments were recognized by the ASI Rajasthan.

Subsequently Rajasthan State Tourism has revised this list; so the current list of State Protected Monuments lists 342 sites.

In addition to this list of the State Protected Monuments, the list of Monuments of National Importance in this state has primary sites .

== List of State Protected Monuments ==
SL. No.	Description	Location	Address	District	Coordinates	Image
	District-Ajmer					Upload Photo
S-RJ-1	Akbar's Fort or Magazine or Daulata Khana	Ajmer		Ajmer	26°27′39″N 74°38′01″E	Akbar's Fort or Magazine or Daulata Khana More images
S-RJ-2	Main Entrance of Akbar's Fort	Ajmer		Ajmer	26°27′39″N 74°37′59″E	Main Entrance of Akbar's Fort More images
S-RJ-3	Toda and Digambaro Ki Jain Chhatries	Ajmer		Ajmer	26°29′21″N 74°37′54″E	Toda and Digambaro Ki Jain Chhatries More images
S-RJ-4	Chamunda Devi Temple	Ajmer		Ajmer	26°26′19″N 74°36′05″E	Upload Photo
S-RJ-5	Santosh Bavala ki Chhatari	Pushkar		Ajmer		Upload Photo
S-RJ-6	Gopinathji Temple	Sarwar		Ajmer	26°03′46″N 75°00′40″E	Upload Photo
S-RJ-7	Ghantaghar	Ajmer		Ajmer	26°27′24″N 74°38′12″E	Ghantaghar More images
S-RJ-8	Nur Chashma	Ajmer		Ajmer	26°26′06″N 74°36′42″E	Nur Chashma More images
S-RJ-9	Toran Stambh, village, Baghera	Baghera		Ajmer	26°01′12″N 75°19′02″E	Upload Photo
S-RJ-10	Shukar Varah, Mandir, village, Baghera	Baghera		Ajmer	26°01′20″N 75°18′57″E	Upload Photo
S-RJ-11	Agra gate	Ajmer		Ajmer	26°27′53″N 74°37′55″E	Upload Photo
S-RJ-12	Usari gate	Ajmer		Ajmer	26°27′07″N 74°38′00″E	Upload Photo
S-RJ-13	Madar gate	Ajmer		Ajmer	26°27′27″N 74°38′06″E	Upload Photo
S-RJ-14	Alwar gate	Ajmer		Ajmer	26°26′45″N 74°38′51″E	Upload Photo
S-RJ-15	Shivling	Nand		Ajmer	26°28′00″N 74°28′35″E	Upload Photo
S-RJ-16	Fort	Sarwar		Ajmer	26°03′30″N 75°00′27″E	Fort More images
S-RJ-17	Fort	Fatehgarh		Ajmer	26°07′55″N 75°01′37″E	Upload Photo
S-RJ-18	Shiv Mandir	Ajaypal		Ajmer	26°24′19″N 74°32′46″E	Upload Photo
S-RJ-19	Kotwali Gate	Ajmer		Ajmer	26°27′45″N 74°37′59″E	Upload Photo
S-RJ-20	King Edward Memorial	Ajmer		Ajmer	26°27′16″N 74°38′12″E	Upload Photo
	District-Alwar					Upload Photo
(S-RJ-13) old number	Nogaja/Nangaj now included with 'N-RJ-142 Neelkanth Mahadev Temple'			Alwar	27°14′46″N 76°20′57″E	Upload Photo
(S-RJ-17) old number	Someshwar Mahadeva place included in 'N-RJ-143 Bhangarh Fort'			Alwar	27°05′43″N 76°17′12″E	Upload Photo
S-RJ-21	Alwar Palace (including Govt. offices, Govt. Museum private parts of Maharaja & Zanana Palaces)	Alwar		Alwar	27°34′11″N 76°35′39″E	Alwar Palace (including Govt. offices, Govt. Museum private parts of Maharaja & Zanana Palaces) More images
S-RJ-22	Tripoliya	Alwar		Alwar	27°34′04″N 76°35′57″E	Tripoliya
S-RJ-23	Fateh Jang Gumbad	Alwar		Alwar	27°33′45″N 76°37′22″E	Fateh Jang Gumbad More images
S-RJ-24	Krishna Kunda	Alwar		Alwar	27°34′31″N 76°35′36″E	Krishna Kunda More images
S-RJ-25	Raj Garh Fort	Rajgarh		Alwar	27°14′02″N 76°37′37″E	Raj Garh Fort More images
S-RJ-26	Bhartrhari Gumbad	Tijara		Alwar	27°55′40″N 76°51′09″E	Bhartrhari Gumbad More images
S-RJ-27	Indor Fort			Alwar	28°05′05″N 76°56′49″E	Upload Photo
S-RJ-28	Khanjnada Ki Kabaren			Alwar	28°04′30″N 76°57′05″E	Upload Photo
S-RJ-29	Ancient Palace of Bada Gujar	Rajgarh		Alwar		Upload Photo
S-RJ-30	Pathan Kabrein	Tijara		Alwar		Upload Photo
S-RJ-31	Cenotaph of Musi Maharani	Alwar		Alwar	27°34′10″N 76°35′35″E	Cenotaph of Musi Maharani More images
S-RJ-32	Bala kila	Alwar		Alwar	27°34′29″N 76°35′15″E	Bala kila More images
	District-Baran					Upload Photo
S-RJ-33	Shiv temple or Bhand Devara	Ramgarh		Baran	25°19′59″N 76°37′31″E	Shiv temple or Bhand Devara More images
S-RJ-34	Hindu Mandir	Baran		Baran	25°06′03″N 76°30′58″E	Upload Photo
S-RJ-35	Group of Temples	Kakuni		Baran	24°28′14″N 76°34′50″E	Upload Photo
S-RJ-36	Ramgarh Fort	Ramgarh		Baran	25°19′21″N 76°36′50″E	Upload Photo
S-RJ-37	Temple	Bansthuni		Baran	25°05′20″N 76°42′14″E	Upload Photo
S-RJ-38	Fort Nahargarh	Nahargarh		Baran	24°55′17″N 76°50′32″E	Upload Photo
S-RJ-39	Old Temple	Khandela		Baran	25°12′02″N 76°51′17″E	Upload Photo
S-RJ-40	Maszid (Mosque)	Shahabad		Baran	25°14′56″N 77°09′09″E	Upload Photo
S-RJ-41	Badal Mahal	Shahabad		Baran	25°14′55″N 77°09′07″E	Upload Photo
S-RJ-42	Fort	Shahabad		Baran	25°14′01″N 77°07′58″E	Upload Photo
S-RJ-43	Fort	Kelwara		Baran	25°07′59″N 76°52′50″E	Upload Photo
S-RJ-44	Shiv Mandir	Noorpur		Baran	24°59′19″N 76°24′13″E	Upload Photo
S-RJ-45	Shiv Mandir	Nagada		Baran	25°10′57″N 76°15′23″E	Upload Photo
S-RJ-46	Mandir	Badera		Baran		Upload Photo
S-RJ-47	Mata Ka Mandir	Bara Khera		Baran		Upload Photo
S-RJ-48	Mandir	Dhuman		Baran		Upload Photo
S-RJ-49	Mandir	Bichalas		Baran	24°48′38″N 76°33′30″E	Upload Photo
S-RJ-50	Group of Temples	Saharod		Baran	24°57′24″N 76°31′02″E	Upload Photo
S-RJ-51	Shakti Sagar Talab	Mothpur		Baran		Upload Photo
S-RJ-52	Cenotaphs of Bamulia Jagidar's	Baran		Baran		Upload Photo
S-RJ-53	Deep Stambh	Niyana, Anta		Baran		Upload Photo
S-RJ-54	Shergarh Ka Kila	Atru		Baran	24°42′34″N 76°32′34″E	Shergarh Ka Kila More images
	District-Barmer					Upload Photo
S-RJ-55	Kiradu Ke Mandir	Hatama		Barmer	25°45′10″N 71°05′52″E	Kiradu Ke Mandir More images
S-RJ-56	Fort of Siwana	Siwana		Barmer	25°39′00″N 72°24′52″E	Fort of Siwana More images
S-RJ-57	Mata Ka Mandir	Bisukala		Barmer	26°15′43″N 71°18′48″E	Upload Photo
S-RJ-58	Sun Temple	Dewaka		Barmer	26°20′51″N 71°12′49″E	Upload Photo
S-RJ-59	Jain Temple	Juna-Patarasar		Barmer	25°39′07″N 71°13′25″E	Upload Photo
	District-Bharatpur					Upload Photo
S-RJ-60-a	Parts of Lohagarh Fort (others are protected as Monuments of National Importance): The Fort	Bharatpur		Bharatpur	27°13′04″N 77°29′50″E	Parts of Lohagarh Fort (others are protected as Monuments of National Importance): The Fort More images
S-RJ-60-b	Kamara Khas	Bharatpur		Bharatpur	27°13′18″N 77°29′39″E	Upload Photo
S-RJ-60-c	Kishori Mahal	Bharatpur		Bharatpur	27°13′14″N 77°29′42″E	Kishori Mahal More images
S-RJ-60-d	Hansarani Mahal	Bharatpur		Bharatpur		Upload Photo
S-RJ-60-e	Kachahari Kala	Bharatpur		Bharatpur		Upload Photo
S-RJ-60-f	Chaman Bagichi	Bharatpur		Bharatpur		Upload Photo
S-RJ-60-g	Hammam	Bharatpur		Bharatpur		Upload Photo
S-RJ-60-h	Mudwall	Bharatpur		Bharatpur		Upload Photo
S-RJ-60-i	Mathura gate	Bharatpur		Bharatpur	27°13′02″N 77°30′03″E	Upload Photo
S-RJ-60-j	Binarain gate (Bir Narayan Gate)	Bharatpur		Bharatpur	27°12′43″N 77°29′47″E	Upload Photo
S-RJ-60-k	Atal Bandh gate	Bharatpur		Bharatpur	27°12′36″N 77°29′31″E	Upload Photo
S-RJ-60-l	Anah gate	Bharatpur		Bharatpur	27°12′49″N 77°29′02″E	Upload Photo
S-RJ-60-m	Kumher gate	Bharatpur		Bharatpur	27°13′08″N 77°28′56″E	Upload Photo
S-RJ-60-n	Govardhan gate	Bharatpur		Bharatpur	27°13′29″N 77°29′35″E	Upload Photo
S-RJ-60-o	Neemda gate	Bharatpur		Bharatpur	27°12′37″N 77°29′15″E	Upload Photo
S-RJ-60-p	Chandpol gate	Bharatpur		Bharatpur	27°13′22″N 77°29′17″E	Upload Photo
S-RJ-60-q	Bastion near Suraj Pol.	Bharatpur		Bharatpur	27°13′23″N 77°30′15″E	Upload Photo
S-RJ-61	Chauburza/Gadhi Khemkaran	Bharatpur		Bharatpur	27°13′01″N 77°29′45″E	Upload Photo
S-RJ-62	Prachin Prasad	Kumher		Bharatpur	27°18′54″N 77°22′45″E	Upload Photo
S-RJ-63	Jal Mahal	Kumher		Bharatpur	27°18′53″N 77°22′52″E	Upload Photo
S-RJ-64	Fort (Deeg Fort)	Deeg		Bharatpur	27°28′15″N 77°19′44″E	Fort (Deeg Fort) More images
S-RJ-65	Kameshwar Mahadev Ka Mandir	Kaman		Bharatpur	27°38′58″N 77°16′33″E	Upload Photo
S-RJ-66	Fort (Weir Fort)	Weir		Bharatpur	27°00′59″N 77°10′34″E	Upload Photo
S-RJ-67	Palace and Vatika (Garden)	Weir		Bharatpur	27°01′05″N 77°10′17″E	Upload Photo
S-RJ-68	Stone Sculpture at Baldevji Ka Mandir	Roopwas		Bharatpur	26°59′51″N 77°37′00″E	Upload Photo
S-RJ-69	Mohammad Gauri Ke Senapati Ki Chhatri	Nadbai		Bharatpur	27°13′06″N 77°11′58″E	Upload Photo
S-RJ-70	Cenotaphs of Holkar	Gangour Soti		Bharatpur	27°20′57″N 77°21′42″E	Upload Photo
S-RJ-71	Ancient Palace and Chhatta	Deeg		Bharatpur	27°28′20″N 77°19′25″E	Upload Photo
S-RJ-72	Ancient Palace	Kaman		Bharatpur	27°38′56″N 77°16′00″E	Upload Photo
S-RJ-73	Akabar ke Kos Chinha	Kaman		Bharatpur	27°38′33″N 77°16′26″E	Upload Photo
S-RJ-74	Akabar ke Kos Chinha	Kaman		Bharatpur		Upload Photo
S-RJ-75	Temple of Surya	Satwas		Bharatpur	27°43′02″N 77°16′37″E	Upload Photo
S-RJ-76	Kale Khan Ka Makbara	Bayana		Bharatpur	26°54′08″N 77°17′18″E	Upload Photo
S-RJ-77	Chhatri of twelve pillars	Bayana		Bharatpur	26°53′13″N 77°14′17″E	Upload Photo
S-RJ-78	Lal Darwaja	Kaman		Bharatpur	27°39′00″N 77°16′07″E	Upload Photo
S-RJ-79	Ancient Well	Kaman		Bharatpur		Upload Photo
S-RJ-80	Well of Dharamraj	Kaman		Bharatpur	27°38′51″N 77°16′40″E	Upload Photo
S-RJ-81	Cenotaphs in the way of Vijay Mandir Garh	Bayana		Bharatpur		Upload Photo
S-RJ-82	Muslim Kabren and Sahale Khan ki Kabren	Sahsan		Bharatpur		Upload Photo
S-RJ-83	Sri Krishan ke paad and Gau Charan Chinha	Bhudaka, Kama		Bharatpur	27°38′39″N 77°14′25″E	Upload Photo
S-RJ-84	Temple of Kedar Nath (on hill) and a tank (below hill)	Vilod, Kama		Bharatpur	27°37′11″N 77°11′36″E	Upload Photo
S-RJ-85	Bhojan Thalian and two Katore	Kalawata, Kama		Bharatpur	27°40′34″N 77°15′57″E	Upload Photo
S-RJ-86	Cave of Bhaumasur and Fislan Patti	Kalawata, Kama		Bharatpur	27°40′35″N 77°15′37″E	Upload Photo
	District-Bhilwara					Upload Photo
S-RJ-87	Battis Khambhon ki Chhatri	Mandal		Bhilwara	25°26′03″N 74°33′46″E	Upload Photo
S-RJ-88	Vishnu Temple	Dhaod (Dhor)		Bhilwara	25°32′20″N 75°19′33″E	Upload Photo
S-RJ-89	Haveli of Late Shri Kesari Singh Barahath	Shahpura		Bhilwara	25°37′31″N 74°55′33″E	Upload Photo
S-RJ-90	Shitla Temple with Sculptures	Dhanop		Bhilwara	25°50′31″N 74°54′09″E	Upload Photo
S-RJ-91	Roothi Rani ka Mandir	Dhaod (Dhor)		Bhilwara	25°31′58″N 75°19′23″E	Upload Photo
S-RJ-92	Minar/Watch Tower	Mandal		Bhilwara	25°26′29″N 74°33′55″E	Upload Photo
S-RJ-93	Durg Mandalgarh	Mandal		Bhilwara	25°12′25″N 75°05′35″E	Upload Photo
	District-Bikaner					Upload Photo
S-RJ-94	Cenotaphs of the early rulers of Bikaner	Bikaner		Bikaner	28°00′08″N 73°18′10″E	Cenotaphs of the early rulers of Bikaner More images
S-RJ-95-a	Gates built on wall of Bikaner city: 1 Kotgate	Bikaner		Bikaner	28°01′00″N 73°18′40″E	Gates built on wall of Bikaner city: 1 Kotgate More images
S-RJ-95-b	Gates built on wall of Bikaner city: 2 Jassusar gate	Bikaner		Bikaner	28°01′13″N 73°17′52″E	Gates built on wall of Bikaner city: 2 Jassusar gate More images
S-RJ-95-c	Gates built on wall of Bikaner city: 3 Natthusar gate	Bikaner		Bikaner	28°00′44″N 73°17′39″E	Upload Photo
S-RJ-95-d	Gates built on wall of Bikaner city: 4 Shitla gate	Bikaner		Bikaner	28°00′19″N 73°17′52″E	Upload Photo
S-RJ-95-e	Gates built on wall of Bikaner city: 5 Goga gate	Bikaner		Bikaner	28°00′18″N 73°18′31″E	Upload Photo
S-RJ-96	Devi Kund Sagar and Cenotaphs	Bikaner		Bikaner	28°01′02″N 73°23′24″E	Devi Kund Sagar and Cenotaphs More images
S-RJ-97	Jambha ji or Mokam Temple	Mokam		Bikaner	27°37′32″N 73°37′06″E	Upload Photo
S-RJ-98	Chintamani Jain Temple	Mokam		Bikaner	28°00′28″N 73°18′10″E	Upload Photo
S-RJ-99	Laxmi Narain Mandir	Bikaner		Bikaner	28°01′11″N 73°19′03″E	Upload Photo
S-RJ-100	Mandir Raj Ratan Behari & Rasik Siromani	Bikaner		Bikaner	28°01′11″N 73°18′56″E	Upload Photo
S-RJ-101	Kirti Stambha & war Memorial	Bikaner		Bikaner	28°01′45″N 73°19′20″E	Upload Photo
S-RJ-102	Haveli of Sh. Sunil Rampuria	Bikaner		Bikaner	28°00′44″N 73°18′17″E	Upload Photo
S-RJ-103	Haveli of Sh. Surendra Rampuria	Bikaner		Bikaner	28°00′44″N 73°18′17″E	Upload Photo
S-RJ-104	Haveli of Sh. Shikharchand Rampuria	Bikaner		Bikaner	28°00′44″N 73°18′17″E	Upload Photo
S-RJ-105	Haveli of Sh. Manakchand Rampuria	Bikaner		Bikaner	28°00′44″N 73°18′17″E	Upload Photo
S-RJ-106	Haveli of Sh. Ratanlal Rampuria	Bikaner		Bikaner	28°00′44″N 73°18′17″E	Upload Photo
S-RJ-107	Haveli of Sh. Jaichand Rampuria	Bikaner		Bikaner	28°00′44″N 73°18′17″E	Upload Photo
S-RJ-108	Haveli of Sh. Moolchand Rampuria	Bikaner		Bikaner	28°00′44″N 73°18′17″E	Upload Photo
	District-Bundi					Upload Photo
S-RJ-109	Raniji Ki Bawari (step well)	Bundi		Bundi	25°26′25″N 75°38′22″E	Raniji Ki Bawari (step well) More images
S-RJ-110	Shiv Temple	Kanwalji		Bundi	25°45′45″N 76°19′38″E	Upload Photo
S-RJ-111	Inscription of Hammir	Kanwalji		Bundi		Upload Photo
S-RJ-112	Chaurasi Khambo ki Chhatri	Bundi		Bundi	25°25′47″N 75°38′49″E	Chaurasi Khambo ki Chhatri More images
S-RJ-113	Bhavaldi Baori	Bundi		Bundi	25°26′47″N 75°38′22″E	Upload Photo
S-RJ-114	Mandir Laxmi Narayan	Bundi		Bundi	25°26′46″N 75°38′11″E	Upload Photo
S-RJ-115	Dhabhaiji ka Kund (Jail Kund)	Bundi		Bundi	25°26′12″N 75°38′19″E	Upload Photo
S-RJ-116	Paintings on Rock Sheltar at Hathidoob site	Haulaspura		Bundi	25°34′30″N 75°40′34″E	Upload Photo
S-RJ-117	Paintings on Rock Sheltar at Nachala site	Haulaspura		Bundi		Upload Photo
S-RJ-118	Paintings on Rock Sheltar at Chhaparia site	Haulaspura		Bundi		Upload Photo
S-RJ-119	Paintings on Rock Sheltar at Undimaya site	Haulaspura		Bundi		Upload Photo
S-RJ-120	Paintings on Rock Sheltar at Khurd ka Nala site	Haulaspura		Bundi		Upload Photo
S-RJ-121	Paintings on Rock Sheltar at Dharawa site	Haulaspura		Bundi		Upload Photo
S-RJ-122	Paintings on Rock Sheltar at Kewadia site	Haulaspura		Bundi		Upload Photo
S-RJ-123	Paintings on Rock Sheltar at Naldeh site	Haulaspura		Bundi		Upload Photo
S-RJ-124	Sukh Mahal	Bundi		Bundi	25°27′10″N 75°38′31″E	Upload Photo
	District-Banswara					Upload Photo
S-RJ-125	Dwarikadhish Temple	Talwara		Banswara	23°33′45″N 74°19′36″E	Upload Photo
	District-Chittorgarh					Upload Photo
(S-RJ-82) Old Number	Brahmi Inscription of Shunga period (Deleted rom list)			Chittorgarh		Upload Photo
(S-RJ-83) Old Number	Rajmahal of Devagarh (Deleted rom list)			Chittorgarh	25°31′44″N 73°54′30″E	Upload Photo
S-RJ-126	Bridge Situated at Gambhiri river	Chittorgarh		Chittorgarh	24°53′21″N 74°37′48″E	Upload Photo
S-RJ-127	Deep Stambh	Nagari		Chittorgarh		Upload Photo
(S-RJ-148) Old Number	Kirti Stambha(Included in N-RJ-41)	Chittorgarh		Chittorgarh	24°53′32″N 74°39′00″E	Kirti Stambha(Included in N-RJ-41) More images
	District-Churu					Upload Photo
S-RJ-128	Sethani ka Jhohara	Churu		Churu	28°17′53″N 74°55′39″E	Sethani ka Jhohara More images
S-RJ-129	Cenotaph of Anand Singh	Taranagar		Churu		Upload Photo
S-RJ-130	Minaryukt Koop	Bootia		Churu	28°20′40″N 75°00′37″E	Upload Photo
S-RJ-131	Sahava ka Talab	Sahava, Taranagar		Churu	28°52′28″N 74°50′43″E	Upload Photo
	District-Dholpur					Upload Photo
S-RJ-132	Much Kund			Dholpur	26°40′51″N 77°51′52″E	Much Kund More images
S-RJ-133	Kund and Shiva temple			Dholpur	26°42′06″N 77°53′22″E	Upload Photo
S-RJ-134	Jarjarina tomb and masjid			Dholpur	26°40′54″N 77°54′03″E	Upload Photo
S-RJ-135	Ancient Baori			Dholpur	26°41′56″N 77°53′50″E	Ancient Baori More images
(S-RJ-88) Old Number N-RJ-153	Shergarh Fort			Dholpur	26°40′19″N 77°54′07″E	Shergarh Fort More images
S-RJ-136	Bhuteshwar Mahadev temple			Dholpur	26°42′50″N 77°32′52″E	Upload Photo
S-RJ-137	Talab Shahi			Dholpur	26°37′18″N 77°39′06″E	Upload Photo
S-RJ-138	Place and Temple, Purani Chhavani	Dholpur		Dholpur	26°41′40″N 77°50′50″E	Upload Photo
S-RJ-139	Remains Architectural opposite Chopra Mahadev temple	Damapur		Dholpur		Upload Photo
	District-Dausa					Upload Photo
S-RJ-140	Bhandarej ki Baori	Baswa		Dausa	26°52′55″N 76°25′17″E	Upload Photo
	District-Hanuman Garh					Upload Photo
S-RJ-141	Cenotaph, Raisinghpura	Nohar		Hanuman Garh		Upload Photo
	District-Jaipur					Upload Photo
S-RJ-142	Albert Hall, Ram Niwas Bagh	Jaipur		Jaipur	26°54′42″N 75°49′10″E	Albert Hall, Ram Niwas Bagh More images
S-RJ-143	Jyotish Yantralaya (also known as Jantar Mantar)	Jaipur		Jaipur	26°55′29″N 75°49′28″E	Jyotish Yantralaya (also known as Jantar Mantar) More images
S-RJ-144	Sudarshana/Naghar Garh (Nahargarh Fort)	Jaipur		Jaipur	26°56′25″N 75°49′01″E	Sudarshana/Naghar Garh (Nahargarh Fort) More images
S-RJ-145	Isarlat	Jaipur		Jaipur	26°55′28″N 75°49′15″E	Isarlat More images
S-RJ-146	Hawa Mahal	Jaipur		Jaipur	26°55′26″N 75°49′36″E	Hawa Mahal More images
S-RJ-147	Cenotaphes of Gaitore			Jaipur	26°56′35″N 75°49′29″E	Cenotaphes of Gaitore More images
S-RJ-148	Temples of Galta			Jaipur	26°55′03″N 75°51′27″E	Temples of Galta More images
S-RJ-149	Bala Nand ji Temple			Jaipur	26°55′50″N 75°48′37″E	Upload Photo
S-RJ-150	Queens Cenotaphs (Amer road)			Jaipur	26°56′41″N 75°50′24″E	Queens Cenotaphs (Amer road) More images
S-RJ-151	Brijnand ji Temple			Jaipur	26°55′30″N 75°49′21″E	Brijnand ji Temple More images
S-RJ-152	Charan Mandir			Jaipur	26°57′10″N 75°49′37″E	Charan Mandir More images
S-RJ-153	Rampart including all gates of old Jaipur City	Jaipur		Jaipur	26°55′01″N 75°49′08″E	Rampart including all gates of old Jaipur City More images
S-RJ-153-a	Gates of old Jaipur City:Suraj Pol Gate	Jaipur		Jaipur	26°55′09″N 75°50′42″E	Upload Photo
S-RJ-153-b	Gates of old Jaipur City:Chandpol Darwaza	Jaipur		Jaipur	26°55′35″N 75°48′34″E	Gates of old Jaipur City:Chandpol Darwaza More images
S-RJ-153-c	Gates of old Jaipur City:Zorawar Singh Gate	Jaipur		Jaipur	26°56′06″N 75°50′00″E	Gates of old Jaipur City:Zorawar Singh Gate More images
S-RJ-153-d	Gates of old Jaipur City:Ajmeri Gate	Jaipur		Jaipur	26°55′04″N 75°49′00″E	Gates of old Jaipur City:Ajmeri Gate More images
S-RJ-153-e	Gates of old Jaipur City:New Gate	Jaipur		Jaipur	26°55′00″N 75°49′15″E	Gates of old Jaipur City:New Gate More images
S-RJ-153-f	Gates of old Jaipur City:Sanganeri Gate	Jaipur		Jaipur	26°54′57″N 75°49′30″E	Gates of old Jaipur City:Sanganeri Gate More images
S-RJ-153-g	Gates of old Jaipur City:Ghat Gate	Jaipur		Jaipur	26°54′51″N 75°49′59″E	Upload Photo
S-RJ-153-h	Gates of old Jaipur City:Gangapol Gate	Jaipur		Jaipur	26°56′05″N 75°50′22″E	Upload Photo
S-RJ-153-i	Gates of old Jaipur City:Samrat Gate	Jaipur		Jaipur	26°56′16″N 75°49′42″E	Upload Photo
S-RJ-153-j	Gates of old Jaipur City:Char Darwaza Gate	Jaipur		Jaipur	26°55′42″N 75°50′11″E	Upload Photo
S-RJ-154	Sanganer Temple			Jaipur	26°48′54″N 75°47′11″E	Sanganer Temple More images
S-RJ-155	Cenotaphs at Station Road			Jaipur		Upload Photo
S-RJ-156	Town hall (Sawai Man Singh Town Hall)	Jaipur		Jaipur	26°55′31″N 75°49′38″E	Town hall (Sawai Man Singh Town Hall) More images
S-RJ-157	Wall Paintings of Samod Haveli Purani Basti			Jaipur	26°56′00″N 75°50′14″E	Wall Paintings of Samod Haveli Purani Basti More images
S-RJ-158	Wall Paintings of Purohit Ji ki Haveli Purani Basti			Jaipur	26°55′51″N 75°49′11″E	Upload Photo
S-RJ-159	Sun Temple Galta Hill			Jaipur	26°55′01″N 75°51′08″E	Sun Temple Galta Hill More images
S-RJ-160	Kalki Temple Sirehdeorhi Bazar			Jaipur	26°55′35″N 75°49′41″E	Kalki Temple Sirehdeorhi Bazar More images
S-RJ-161	Bhawani Rao Bohara's House	Ghat ki Gooni		Jaipur	26°54′07″N 75°51′08″E	Bhawani Rao Bohara's House More images
S-RJ-162	Sisodia Maharani Temple	Ghat ki Gooni		Jaipur	26°53′58″N 75°51′31″E	Sisodia Maharani Temple More images
S-RJ-163	Wall Paintings of Janana Ghat Galta			Jaipur	26°55′03″N 75°51′26″E	Wall Paintings of Janana Ghat Galta More images
S-RJ-164	Sun Temple Galta			Jaipur		Upload Photo
S-RJ-165	Krishna Deva Payahari Ki Gufa Galta			Jaipur	26°55′00″N 75°51′27″E	Krishna Deva Payahari Ki Gufa Galta More images
S-RJ-166	Akabar Ke Kos Chinha	Mansarovar Jaipur		Jaipur	26°51′23″N 75°45′32″E	Akabar Ke Kos Chinha More images
S-RJ-167	Wall Paintings of Chhatari near Prachin Govind Devaji ka Temple Amber Ghati			Jaipur	26°57′46″N 75°50′44″E	Upload Photo
S-RJ-168	Prachin Govind Devaji ka Temple Amber Ghati			Jaipur	26°57′49″N 75°50′51″E	Upload Photo
S-RJ-169	Kalyan ji Temple Amber	Amber		Jaipur	26°59′25″N 75°51′05″E	Upload Photo
S-RJ-170	Amber Palace on Hill, Amber (Amber Fort)	Amber		Jaipur	26°59′08″N 75°51′01″E	Amber Palace on Hill, Amber (Amber Fort) More images
S-RJ-171	Cenotaphs at Shahpur Road, Amber	Amber		Jaipur	26°59′21″N 75°51′46″E	Cenotaphs at Shahpur Road, Amber More images
S-RJ-172	Prachin Mahal below Hill, Amber	Amber		Jaipur	26°59′16″N 75°50′59″E	Prachin Mahal below Hill, Amber More images
S-RJ-173	Panna Miyan Ka Kund, Amber (Panna Meena ka Kund)	Amber		Jaipur	26°59′28″N 75°51′05″E	Panna Miyan Ka Kund, Amber (Panna Meena ka Kund) More images
S-RJ-174	Dalaram Garden, Amber	Amber		Jaipur	26°59′09″N 75°51′01″E	Dalaram Garden, Amber More images
S-RJ-175	Mohan Bari, Amber (Kesar Kyari)	Amber		Jaipur	26°59′06″N 75°51′09″E	Mohan Bari, Amber (Kesar Kyari) More images
S-RJ-176	Sanghi Temple, Amber	Amber		Jaipur	26°59′22″N 75°51′13″E	Sanghi Temple, Amber More images
S-RJ-177	Shri Narsinghji Temple, Amber	Amber		Jaipur	26°59′17″N 75°50′58″E	Shri Narsinghji Temple, Amber More images
S-RJ-178	Rampart of old Amber town, Amber	Amber		Jaipur	26°59′06″N 75°51′16″E	Rampart of old Amber town, Amber More images
S-RJ-179	Mughal Gate	Viratnagar		Kotputli Behror	27°26′57″N 76°10′38″E	Upload Photo
S-RJ-180	Jamwa Mata Temple	Jamwa Ramgarh		Jaipur	27°02′18″N 76°03′46″E	Jamwa Mata Temple More images
S-RJ-181	Wall Paintings of Bhaopura Chhatri	Bhaopura		Jaipur	26°44′31″N 75°39′14″E	Upload Photo
S-RJ-182	Prachin Baori	Bhaopura		Jaipur	26°44′33″N 75°39′13″E	Upload Photo
S-RJ-183	Chomu Fort	Chomu		Jaipur	27°10′04″N 75°43′22″E	Upload Photo
S-RJ-184	Nakati Mata Temple	Jai Bhawanipura		Jaipur	26°52′57″N 75°38′14″E	Upload Photo
S-RJ-185	Nayala Fort	Nayala		Jaipur	26°55′43″N 75°58′30″E	Upload Photo
S-RJ-186	Nayala Palace	Nayala		Jaipur	26°55′18″N 75°58′35″E	Upload Photo
S-RJ-187	Cenotophs near Parion ka Bagh	Amber		Jaipur		Upload Photo
S-RJ-188	Sh. Laxmi Narain Mandir, opposite, Hathi Stand Rambagh	Amber		Jaipur	26°59′11″N 75°51′15″E	Upload Photo
S-RJ-189	Sh. Gopal ji ka mandir opposite Hathi Stand Ramgagh	Amber		Jaipur	26°59′12″N 75°51′16″E	Upload Photo
S-RJ-190	Laxmi Narain ka mandir (Behari ji) opposite, Panna miyan kund	Amber		Jaipur	26°59′29″N 75°51′03″E	Laxmi Narain ka mandir (Behari ji) opposite, Panna miyan kund More images
S-RJ-191	Properties Situated in Ghat ki Guni, Jamdoli	Jaipur		Jaipur	26°53′56″N 75°51′20″E	Upload Photo
S-RJ-192	Inscription of Ashoka the Great	Virat Nagar		Kotputli Behror	27°27′07″N 76°11′06″E	Upload Photo
S-RJ-193	Akbar ki kos Minar	Johparia, BassI		Jaipur		Upload Photo
S-RJ-194	Akbar ki kos Minar	Jhar, Bassi		Jaipur	26°51′16″N 76°07′33″E	Upload Photo
S-RJ-195	Akbar ki kos Minar	Malihala, Bassi		Jaipur		Upload Photo
S-RJ-196	Akbar ki kos Minar	Hans Mahal, Bassi		Jaipur		Upload Photo
S-RJ-197	Akbar ki kos Minar	Jaipur		Jaipur	26°47′56″N 75°39′53″E	Upload Photo
S-RJ-198	Akbar ki kos Minar	Jaipur		Jaipur		Upload Photo
S-RJ-199	Devyani Kund	Sambhar		Jaipur	26°55′02″N 75°12′03″E	Upload Photo
S-RJ-200	Nahargarh ki Bawari	Jaipur		Jaipur	26°56′21″N 75°49′03″E	Nahargarh ki Bawari More images
S-RJ-201	Area of Parion ka Bagh including two Ancient Baori,two wells, Ancient irrigation method, one temple & one muzar	Amber		Jaipur	26°58′44″N 75°51′06″E	Upload Photo
S-RJ-202	Natanion ki Haveli	Jaipur		Jaipur	26°55′23″N 75°49′39″E	Upload Photo
S-RJ-203	Sisodia Rani ka Bagh (Ghat ki Guni)	Jamdoli		Jaipur	26°53′57″N 75°51′34″E	Sisodia Rani ka Bagh (Ghat ki Guni) More images
S-RJ-204	Two Storeyed Bairathi Haveli near Jain Temple Mohalla Purohitan	Amber		Jaipur		Upload Photo
S-RJ-205	Two Chhabara Havelies, Bangali Pada (Lal Bazar)	Amber		Jaipur		Upload Photo
S-RJ-206	Cenotaphs of Sudamapuri, situated at Agra Road, Jaipur as :- (1) Cenotaphs of Daroga Shri Manna Lal Vijai Lal (with inscription Samvat 1899) (2) Cenotaphs of Daroga Shri Swaroop Chand (with inscription Samvat 1900)	Jaipur		Jaipur		Upload Photo
(S-RJ-129) Old Number	Sheesh Mahal of Samode Palace(Deleted from List)	Samode		Jaipur	27°12′19″N 75°48′22″E	Upload Photo
	District-Jaisalmer					Upload Photo
S-RJ-207	Patwa Haveli-3129 (Kothari's Museum)	Jaisalmer		Jaisalmer	26°54′59″N 70°54′52″E	Patwa Haveli-3129 (Kothari's Museum) More images
S-RJ-208	Patwa Haveli-3128 with ASI	Jaisalmer		Jaisalmer	26°54′58″N 70°54′52″E	Patwa Haveli-3128 with ASI More images
S-RJ-209	Patwa Haveli-3017	Jaisalmer		Jaisalmer	26°54′58″N 70°54′53″E	Patwa Haveli-3017 More images
S-RJ-210	Patwa Haveli-3126	Jaisalmer		Jaisalmer	26°54′58″N 70°54′53″E	Patwa Haveli-3126 More images
S-RJ-211	Patwa Haveli-3127	Jaisalmer		Jaisalmer	26°54′58″N 70°54′53″E	Patwa Haveli-3127 More images
S-RJ-212	Patwa Haveli-3127 B	Jaisalmer		Jaisalmer	26°54′58″N 70°54′53″E	Patwa Haveli-3127 B More images
S-RJ-213	Patwa Haveli-3013	Jaisalmer		Jaisalmer	26°54′59″N 70°54′53″E	Patwa Haveli-3013 More images
S-RJ-214	Salam Singh ki Haveli-2521	Jaisalmer		Jaisalmer	26°54′50″N 70°54′58″E	Salam Singh ki Haveli-2521 More images
S-RJ-215	Nathmal ki Haveli-4434	Jaisalmer		Jaisalmer	26°54′57″N 70°54′46″E	Nathmal ki Haveli-4434 More images
S-RJ-216	Teelon Ki Piral	Jaisalmer		Jaisalmer	26°54′33″N 70°55′15″E	Teelon Ki Piral More images
S-RJ-217	Kirti Stambha	Ola		Jaisalmer	26°29′11″N 71°29′38″E	Upload Photo
S-RJ-218	Kuldhara Ancient village (whole village)	Jaisalmer		Jaisalmer	26°52′12″N 70°47′10″E	Kuldhara Ancient village (whole village) More images
S-RJ-219	Ancient village Khabha (whole village)	Jaisalmer		Jaisalmer	26°48′41″N 70°40′24″E	Ancient village Khabha (whole village) More images
S-RJ-220	Kishangarh Fort	Kishangarh		Jaisalmer	27°52′16″N 70°33′49″E	Kishangarh Fort More images
S-RJ-221	Ghotaru Fort	Ghotaru		Jaisalmer	27°19′02″N 70°02′30″E	Upload Photo
S-RJ-222	Ganeshia Fort	Bichia Chod		Jaisalmer	27°16′14″N 69°42′06″E	Upload Photo
	District-Jalore					Upload Photo
S-RJ-223	Jalore Fort	Jalore		Jalore	25°20′13″N 72°36′58″E	Upload Photo
S-RJ-224	Tophkhana	Jalore		Jalore	25°20′47″N 72°37′04″E	Upload Photo
S-RJ-225	Ancient Cenotaphs, Bhadrajune	Ahor		Jalore	25°36′02″N 72°53′27″E	Upload Photo
	District-Jhalawar					Upload Photo
S-RJ-226	Fort (Gagron Fort)	near Jhalawar		Jhalawar	24°37′41″N 76°11′09″E	Fort (Gagron Fort) More images
S-RJ-227	Dargah Meethe Sahab	Gagron		Jhalawar	24°37′44″N 76°10′56″E	Upload Photo
S-RJ-228	Padma Nabhi/Sun Temple	Jhalara Patan		Jhalawar	24°32′05″N 76°10′14″E	Padma Nabhi/Sun Temple More images
S-RJ-229	Shiv Temple and Math Dehalanpur	Dehalanpur, Aklera		Jhalawar	24°20′10″N 76°28′39″E	Upload Photo
S-RJ-230	Antiquites of Mau Borda	Mau Borda, Khanpur		Jhalawar	24°33′45″N 76°20′11″E	Upload Photo
S-RJ-231	Chhaneri Paneri Temple	Jhalrapatan		Jhalawar	24°31′05″N 76°20′34″E	Upload Photo
S-RJ-232	Madan Vilas	Jhalrapatan		Jhalawar	24°32′18″N 76°10′03″E	Upload Photo
S-RJ-233	Garh Palace	Jhalawar		Jhalawar	24°35′46″N 76°09′56″E	Garh Palace More images
	District-Jodhpur					Upload Photo
S-RJ-234	Jodhpur Fort (Mehrangarh)	Jodhpur		Jodhpur	26°17′53″N 73°01′08″E	Jodhpur Fort (Mehrangarh) More images
S-RJ-235	Hari-Har Temple-1	Osian		Jodhpur	26°43′23″N 72°54′52″E	Hari-Har Temple-1 More images
S-RJ-236	Hari-Har Temple-2	Osian		Jodhpur	26°43′25″N 72°54′47″E	Hari-Har Temple-2 More images
S-RJ-237	Hari-Har Temple-3	Osian		Jodhpur	26°43′25″N 72°54′47″E	Hari-Har Temple-3 More images
S-RJ-238	Hari-Har Temple-4	Osian		Jodhpur	26°43′25″N 72°54′46″E	Upload Photo
S-RJ-239	Hari-Har Temple-5	Osian		Jodhpur		Upload Photo
S-RJ-240	Sun Temple (Temple no. 7)	Osian		Jodhpur	26°43′26″N 72°54′43″E	Sun Temple (Temple no. 7) More images
S-RJ-241	Shiv Temple (Temple no. 8)	Osian		Jodhpur	26°43′24″N 72°54′46″E	Upload Photo
S-RJ-242	Piplad Mata Temple (Temple no. 9)	Osian		Jodhpur	26°43′26″N 72°54′35″E	Upload Photo
S-RJ-243	Vishnu Temple	Osian		Jodhpur	26°43′32″N 72°54′27″E	Upload Photo
S-RJ-244	Jain Temple (Mahavira Jain temple)	Osian		Jodhpur	26°43′26″N 72°54′34″E	Jain Temple (Mahavira Jain temple) More images
S-RJ-245	Sachiya Mata Temple	Osian		Jodhpur	26°43′34″N 72°54′45″E	Sachiya Mata Temple More images
S-RJ-246	Baoli (Step well known as Jalra or Jhalra) also listed as: Baori (Jalara or Jhalara)	Osian		Jodhpur	26°43′25″N 72°54′41″E	Upload Photo
S-RJ-247	Heroes Hall "Veero Ki Dalan"	Mandore		Jodhpur	26°21′08″N 73°01′58″E	Heroes Hall "Veero Ki Dalan" More images
S-RJ-248	Cenotaph of Rao Mal Deva	Mandore		Jodhpur	26°21′07″N 73°02′06″E	Cenotaph of Rao Mal Deva More images
S-RJ-249	Cenotaph of Motaraja Udai Singh	Mandore		Jodhpur	26°21′07″N 73°02′07″E	Cenotaph of Motaraja Udai Singh More images
S-RJ-250	Cenotaph of Sawai Raja Sur Singh	Mandore		Jodhpur	26°21′07″N 73°02′06″E	Cenotaph of Sawai Raja Sur Singh More images
S-RJ-251	Cenotaph of Raja Gaj Singh	Mandore		Jodhpur	26°21′08″N 73°02′07″E	Cenotaph of Raja Gaj Singh More images
S-RJ-252	Cenotaph of Maharaja Jaswant Singh-I	Mandore		Jodhpur	26°21′09″N 73°02′07″E	Cenotaph of Maharaja Jaswant Singh-I More images
S-RJ-253	Cenotaph of Maharaj Ajeet Singh	Mandore		Jodhpur	26°21′10″N 73°02′07″E	Cenotaph of Maharaj Ajeet Singh More images
S-RJ-254	Cenotaphes at Panch Kunda	Panch Kunda, Mandore		Jodhpur	26°21′27″N 73°01′43″E	Cenotaphes at Panch Kunda More images
S-RJ-255	Kakku Deval and Kirti Stambha	Ghatiyala		Jodhpur	26°23′04″N 72°46′49″E	Upload Photo
S-RJ-256	Sculpture of Tokeshwara Maharaja	Mandore		Jodhpur		Upload Photo
S-RJ-257	Ravana ki Chanwari	Mandore		Jodhpur	26°21′08″N 73°02′33″E	Upload Photo
S-RJ-258	City wall Jodhpur	Jodhpur		Jodhpur	26°18′21″N 73°01′48″E	City wall Jodhpur More images
S-RJ-259	Shiv Mandir, Lamba	Bilara		Jodhpur	26°12′04″N 73°33′28″E	Upload Photo
S-RJ-260	Vishnu & Shiv Mandir Bhuchkalla	Bilara		Jodhpur	26°20′54″N 73°27′17″E	Upload Photo
S-RJ-261	Prachin Mandir, Gangani	Jodhpur		Jodhpur	26°29′52″N 73°12′44″E	Upload Photo
S-RJ-262	Prachin Mahal, Sursagar	Jodhpur		Jodhpur	26°18′42″N 73°00′35″E	Upload Photo
S-RJ-263	Durg Phalodi	Phalodi		Jodhpur	27°08′01″N 72°21′36″E	Upload Photo
S-RJ-264	Zanana Mahal	Mandore		Jodhpur	26°21′11″N 73°01′58″E	Zanana Mahal More images
S-RJ-265	Harsh ka Deval (Shiv Temple)	Varna (Bilara)		Jodhpur	26°09′19″N 73°45′14″E	Upload Photo
S-RJ-266	Prachin Shiv Temple Bawari	Bhopalgarh		Jodhpur	26°37′04″N 73°11′08″E	Upload Photo
S-RJ-267	Prachin Shivalay, Bhundana	Bhopalgarh		Jodhpur	26°29′42″N 73°30′17″E	Upload Photo
	District-Jhunjhunu					Upload Photo
S-RJ-268	Fort, with fortified including all structures	Khetri		Jhunjhunu	27°59′31″N 75°46′20″E	Fort, with fortified including all structures More images
S-RJ-269	Fatehvilas Mahal, with fortified including all structures	Khetri		Jhunjhunu	28°00′18″N 75°47′11″E	Upload Photo
S-RJ-270	Panna Lal Shah Talab, with fortified including all structures	Khetri		Jhunjhunu	27°59′58″N 75°46′52″E	Upload Photo
S-RJ-271	Temple of Raghunath Ji, with fortified including all structures	Khetri		Jhunjhunu	27°59′59″N 75°46′55″E	Upload Photo
S-RJ-272	Temple of Madan Mohan Ji, with fortified including all structures	Khetri		Jhunjhunu	28°00′03″N 75°47′07″E	Upload Photo
	District-Karoli					Upload Photo
S-RJ-273	Timangarh Fort	Karauli		Karauli	26°42′16″N 77°15′35″E	Timangarh Fort More images
S-RJ-274	Shahi Kund	Karauli		Karauli	26°29′35″N 77°01′59″E	Upload Photo
S-RJ-275	Tomb of Kabirshah	Karauli		Karauli	26°29′52″N 77°01′23″E	Upload Photo
	District-Kota					Upload Photo
S-RJ-276	Brij Vilas Bhawan	Kota		Kota	25°11′08″N 75°51′16″E	Upload Photo
S-RJ-277	Kishor Sagar and Jag Mandir	Kota		Kota	25°10′59″N 75°50′58″E	Kishor Sagar and Jag Mandir
S-RJ-278	Kabren of Kesar Khan and Dokar Khan	Kota		Kota	25°11′16″N 75°50′47″E	Upload Photo
S-RJ-279	Shiv Temple	Haripura		Kota	25°25′47″N 76°33′35″E	Upload Photo
S-RJ-280	Sun Temple	Budhadeet		Kota	25°23′30″N 76°14′34″E	Sun Temple
S-RJ-281	Badri Nath and Parshva Nath Temples group	Auwa		Kota	24°55′48″N 76°05′57″E	Upload Photo
S-RJ-282	Cave Paintings and Rock Paintings	Alaniya		Kota		Upload Photo
S-RJ-283	Temple group	Kanwas		Kota		Upload Photo
S-RJ-284	The Fortification wall	Darrah		Kota	24°48′55″N 75°59′11″E	Upload Photo
S-RJ-285	Gaipar Nath	Rata Kankara		Kota	25°03′35″N 75°43′15″E	Gaipar Nath
S-RJ-286	Shiv Math Mandir	Chandresal		Kota	25°12′55″N 75°56′50″E	Upload Photo
S-RJ-287	Group of Temple	Manas		Kota	25°13′40″N 75°59′26″E	Upload Photo
S-RJ-288	Ancient Shiv Temple	Bargu Sangod		Kota	25°08′40″N 76°03′35″E	Upload Photo
S-RJ-289	Group of temples	Thoonpur		Kota		Upload Photo
	District-Nagaur					Upload Photo
S-RJ-290	Fort	Nagaur		Nagaur	27°11′57″N 73°44′15″E	Fort More images
S-RJ-291	Tarkin/Buland Darwaja	Nagaur		Nagaur	27°12′21″N 73°44′29″E	Upload Photo
S-RJ-292	Cenotaph of Amar Singh	Nagaur		Nagaur	27°11′48″N 73°43′40″E	Cenotaph of Amar Singh More images
S-RJ-293	Akabari Maszid	Merta city		Nagaur	26°38′51″N 74°02′00″E	Upload Photo
S-RJ-294	Malkot Fort	Merta city		Nagaur	26°38′11″N 74°01′52″E	Upload Photo
S-RJ-295	Shiv Temple	Kekind		Nagaur	26°27′05″N 74°05′19″E	Upload Photo
S-RJ-296	Baori and Sculptures	Choti Khatu		Nagaur	27°09′17″N 74°21′01″E	Upload Photo
S-RJ-297	Shiv Temple	Thanwala		Nagaur	26°33′30″N 74°27′55″E	Upload Photo
S-RJ-298	Mandir-Maszid	Ladnun		Nagaur		Upload Photo
S-RJ-299	Dadhi Mati Mata Temple	Goth Manglod,Nagaur		Nagaur	27°14′14″N 74°04′32″E	Dadhi Mati Mata Temple More images
S-RJ-300	Appaji Sindhiya ki chhatri	Tausor, Nagaur		Nagaur	27°08′54″N 73°43′48″E	Upload Photo
S-RJ-301	Devi Mandir, Khundala	Khinvsor		Nagaur	26°52′37″N 73°20′01″E	Upload Photo
S-RJ-302	Chhatriyan Tantvas	Khinvsor		Nagaur		Upload Photo
S-RJ-303	Meera Mahal	Merta City		Nagaur	26°39′18″N 74°02′27″E	Upload Photo
S-RJ-304	Rao Dudagarh	Merta City		Nagaur	26°38′53″N 74°01′57″E	Upload Photo
S-RJ-305	Pada Mata Mandir, Gram Balia	Didvana		Nagaur	27°21′37″N 74°34′01″E	Upload Photo
S-RJ-306	Nathon ka Math, Gram Badali	Nagaur		Nagaur	27°12′40″N 73°44′40″E	Upload Photo
S-RJ-307	Sham Maszid	Nagaur		Nagaur	27°11′50″N 73°44′39″E	Upload Photo
S-RJ-308	Akabari Maszid or Shahi Maszid	Nagaur		Nagaur	27°12′04″N 73°44′32″E	Akabari Maszid or Shahi Maszid More images
	District-Pali					Upload Photo
S-RJ-309	Makar Mandi Mata Temple	Nimaj		Pali	26°08′04″N 74°01′25″E	Upload Photo
S-RJ-310	Sun Temple	Ranakpur		Pali	25°06′52″N 73°28′13″E	Sun Temple More images
S-RJ-311	Sojat Durg	Sojat City		Pali	25°55′37″N 73°40′01″E	Upload Photo
	District-Pratapgarh					Upload Photo
S-RJ-312	Inscription with pillar of shung period in Brahami	Anwaleshwar		Pratapgarh	24°00′54″N 74°51′55″E	Upload Photo
	District-Rajsamand					Upload Photo
S-RJ-313	Charbhuja Temple	Khamnor		Rajsamand	24°55′17″N 73°43′19″E	Upload Photo
S-RJ-314	Durga Temple	Unwas		Rajsamand	24°52′56″N 73°43′29″E	Upload Photo
(S-RJ-202) Old Number	Group of Cenotaph ( Deleted from List)			Rajsamand		Upload Photo
(S-RJ-205) Old Number	Nadol ( Deleted from List)			Rajsamand		Upload Photo
	District-Sirohi					Upload Photo
S-RJ-315	Sun Temple	Varman		Sirohi	24°36′12″N 72°28′26″E	Upload Photo
S-RJ-316	Ancient fortification wall, Chandravati	Sirohi		Sirohi	24°53′11″N 72°51′57″E	Upload Photo
	District-Sikar					Upload Photo
S-RJ-317	Fatehpur Fort	Fatehpur		Sikar	27°59′45″N 74°57′15″E	Upload Photo
S-RJ-318	Temple of Omal-Somal Devi	Saledipur		Sikar	27°39′18″N 75°31′00″E	Upload Photo
S-RJ-319	Chand Singh ki Chhatri, Ganeri	Laxmangarh		Sikar	27°38′08″N 74°43′32″E	Upload Photo
	District-Sawaimadhopur					Upload Photo
S-RJ-320	Rest House at Mora Sagar Bandh	Bamanwas		Sawai Madhopur	26°39′41″N 76°32′14″E	Upload Photo
S-RJ-321	Rest House at Dheel Dam	Bonli		Sawai Madhopur	26°13′19″N 76°06′59″E	Upload Photo
S-RJ-322	Rest House at Gilai Sagar Bandh	Khandar		Sawai Madhopur	26°01′25″N 76°34′56″E	Upload Photo
	District-Tonk					Upload Photo
S-RJ-323	Sunehri Kothi	Tonk		Tonk	26°09′38″N 75°46′57″E	Sunehri Kothi More images
	District-Udaipur					Upload Photo
S-RJ-324	Jagdish Temple	Udaipur		Udaipur	24°34′47″N 73°41′01″E	Jagdish Temple More images
S-RJ-325	Moti Magari ke Prasad	Udaipur		Udaipur	24°36′01″N 73°40′47″E	Moti Magari ke Prasad More images
S-RJ-326	Gangodbhav Kund, Ahar	Ahar		Udaipur	24°35′18″N 73°43′07″E	Gangodbhav Kund, Ahar More images
S-RJ-327	Shiv Temple group, Ahar	Ahar		Udaipur	24°35′17″N 73°43′07″E	Upload Photo
S-RJ-328	Meera Temple, Ahar	Ahar		Udaipur	24°35′14″N 73°43′04″E	Meera Temple, Ahar More images
S-RJ-329	Cenotaph of Raja Rama Shah's Sons, Ahar	Ahar		Udaipur	24°35′15″N 73°43′12″E	Cenotaph of Raja Rama Shah's Sons, Ahar More images
S-RJ-330	Meera Temple, Kailashpuri	Kailashpuri (Eklingji)		Udaipur	24°44′49″N 73°43′24″E	Meera Temple, Kailashpuri More images
S-RJ-331	Ramnath Temple and Baori	Jawar		Udaipur	24°20′58″N 73°41′44″E	Upload Photo
S-RJ-332	Kesariya ji Temple	Dhooleva		Udaipur	24°04′36″N 73°41′22″E	Kesariya ji Temple More images
S-RJ-333	Ambika Mata Temple	Jagat		Udaipur	24°22′46″N 73°53′18″E	Ambika Mata Temple More images
S-RJ-334	Sun Temple	Toos		Udaipur	24°36′59″N 73°54′37″E	Upload Photo
S-RJ-335	Vishnu Temple	Iswal		Udaipur	24°44′32″N 73°38′56″E	Upload Photo
S-RJ-336	Temple	Kathadavana		Udaipur		Upload Photo
S-RJ-337	Shiv Temple	Paladi		Udaipur		Upload Photo
S-RJ-338	Temple of Tripurusha Deva	Ghasa		Udaipur		Upload Photo
S-RJ-339	Sun Temple	Nandesama		Udaipur	24°49′52″N 73°27′54″E	Upload Photo
S-RJ-340	Shiv Temple	Amarakji		Udaipur	24°40′07″N 73°43′37″E	Upload Photo
S-RJ-341	Pratimaon Ka Chabutra (Mataji Ka Than)	Tanesar		Udaipur	24°13′07″N 73°42′49″E	Upload Photo
S-RJ-342	Sajjangarh or Monsoon Palace	Udaipur		Udaipur	24°35′35″N 73°38′23″E	Sajjangarh or Monsoon Palace More images

== See also ==
- List of State Protected Monuments in India
- List of Monuments of National Importance in Rajasthan
