= Sarvar =

Sarvar can refer to:

- Sárvár, a town in Hungary
  - Sárvár District
- Sarvar, Bhopal, a village in Madhya Pradesh, India
- Sarvāṛ, a town in Rajasthan, India
- Sarvar Ikramov, Uzbekistani tennis player

== See also ==
- Sarwar (disambiguation)
- Sarvari (disambiguation)
