= Sarwar =

Sarwar is a personal name, most popular among Muslims of Pakistani, Bangladeshi or Indian origin. It originates from Persian (سرور) meaning "leader" or "chief". The name has also been used for places.

== Places ==
- Sarwar, Rajasthan, a town in India
- Khuian Sarwar, a village in Punjab, India
- Sakhi Sarwar, a town in Punjab, Pakistan
- Chowk Sarwar Shaheed Tehsil, in Punjab, Pakistan

== People ==
=== First name ===
- Sarwar Ahmed (born 1971), British publisher
- Sarwar Ahuja (born 1980), Indian actor
- Sarwar Azam (born 1952), Bangladeshi general
- Sarwar Danish (born 1961), Afghan politician
- Sarwar Hossain (born 1966), Bangladeshi general
- Sarwar Hussain (born 1949), Indian politician
- Sarwar Imran, Bangladeshi cricket coach
- Sarwar Jahan Nizam (1952–2025), Bangladeshi naval officer
- Sarwar Jamal Nizam (born 1945), Bangladeshi politician
- Sarwar Khan (born 2004), Indian folk singer
- Sarwar Sarkhosh (1942–1983), Afghan singer
- Sarwar Sultana Begum (1875–1965), Afghan royal consort
- Sarwar Ahmedzai (born 1972), Afghan politician
- Sarwar Bari (born 1966), Bangladeshi doctor and former Health Secretary

=== Surname or middle name ===
- Adnan Sarwar (born 1979), Pakistani actor musician
- AKM Sarwar Jahan Badsha, Bangladeshi politician
- Anas Sarwar (born 1983), British politician
- Ataul Hakim Sarwar Hasan (born 1966), Bangladeshi general
- Azeem Sarwar (broadcaster) (1943–2021), Pakistani broadcaster
- Azeem Sarwar (badminton) (born 1991), Pakistani badminton player
- Beena Sarwar, Pakistani journalist
- Chaudhry Mohammad Sarwar (born 1950), British-Pakistani politician
- Chaudhry Muhammad Sarwar Khan (1919–2003), longest serving parliamentarian of Pakistan
- Faryadi Sarwar Zardad (born 1963), Afghan warlord
- Golam Sarwar (1943–2018), Bangladeshi writer
- Golam Sarwar Hiru, Bangladeshi politician
- Ghulam Sarwar Hussaini, Pakistani politician
- Ghulam Sarwar (born 1945), British-Bangladeshi writer
- Ghulam Sarwar Khan (born 1952), Pakistani politician
- Ghulam-Sarwar Yousof (1939–2022), Malaysian academic
- Kabori Sarwar (1950–2021), Bangladeshi film actress politician
- Kazi Sarwar Hossain, Bangladeshi general
- Majibur Rahman Sarwar (born 1954), Bangladeshi politician
- Mir Sarwar (born 1977), Indian actor
- Mohammad Sarwar (cricketer) (born 1995), Pakistani cricketer
- Mohammed Sarwar (murderer) (1967–2012), Pakistani murderer
- Mohammad Sarwar Yousafzai, Afghan footballer
- Mohammad Sarwar Ahmadzai (born 1972), Afghan politician
- Mostofa Sarwar Farooki (born 1973), Bangladeshi film director
- Mufti Ghulam Sarwar Lahori (1837–1890), 19th-century Islamic scholar from Lahore
- Muhammad Sarwar (field hockey) (born 1975), Pakistani field hockey player
- Muhammad Sarwar Khan (1942–2008), Pakistani politician
- Muhammad Shahid Sarwar (born 1952), Pakistani colonel
- Naved Sarwar (born 1989), Pakistani cricketer
- Nazir Muhammad Sarwar Khan (died 1888), Afghan governor
- Nouman Sarwar (born 1984), Qatar cricketer
- Papia Sarwar (1952–2024), Bangladeshi singer
- Raja Ashfaq Sarwar (1954–2020), Pakistani politician
- Raja Muhammad Sarwar (1910–1948), Pakistani general
- Rashid Sarwar (born 1965), Scottish football player
- Samia Sarwar (1970–1999), Pakistani woman
- Sehba Sarwar, Pakistani writer
- Shah Shahid Sarwar, Bangladeshi politician
- Shaimum Sarwar Kamal (born 1970), Bangladeshi politician
- Shehram Sarwar Chaudhary (born 1965), Pakistani judge
- Shoaib Sarwar (born 1986), UAE cricketer
- Sufi Muhammad Sarwar (1933–2018), Pakistani scholar
- Usman Sarwar (born 1983), Pakistani cricketer

== Others ==
- Sarwar Shaheed Halt railway station, Pakistan

== See also ==
- Sarshar (disambiguation)
