= Azeem Sarwar =

Azeem Sarwar may refer to:

- Azeem Sarwar (badminton)
- Azeem Sarwar (broadcaster)
