= Newara =

Village in Rajasthan, India

Coordinates: 27°46′N 79°17′E

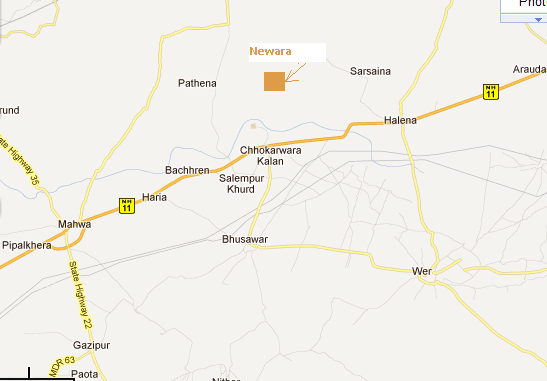
Location of Newara

Newara is a village and a panchayat in the weir tehsil of the Bharatpur district in the state of Rajasthan, India. It is situated south-west of Bharatpur at a distance of about 37 km. Newara is situated 5 km away from the NH-11 road, between Jaipur and Agra.

The village is located on the banks of the Banganga River which flows within the geographical area of Rajasthan. Its geographical position is 27° 8'33.55"N (Latitude) and 77° 5'3.21"E (Longitude).

== Demographics ==
The village is mainly inhabited by Jats. The other major castes are Brahman, Mali, Muslims, Baniya, Meenas and Jatav.

The village is equipped with all modern developments and has a regular supply of electricity (now owning its own 32 kV Grid Sub Station), water, modern agriculture means and proper public-private facilities in education.

== Agriculture ==
Newara is one of the biggest village in the Bharatpur District in terms of agricultural land. Almost 80% of the population depend on agriculture as a source of income. With the spread of education, the people are now becoming familiar with new agricultural techniques. Use of sprinkler pumps, tractors, fertilizers, pesticides and the use of high yielding seeds, submersible pumps, etc. has proved to be a boon for agricultural development in the village.

The major crops include wheat, mustard, gram, bajra, jwar, gwar. The major vegetable crops include: watermelon, melon, cucumber, tinda, pumpkin, locky, kaddu, lady finger, etc.

== Education ==
The education programs implemented by the government of Rajasthan are given proper attention in making people aware about the benefits of education. As the result, people from Newara are now making their presence in various government and private services like the medical, civil, engineering and defense fields.

== Development plans ==
The Mahatma Gandhi National Rural Employment Guarantee Act aims at enhancing the livelihood security of people in rural areas by guaranteeing hundred days of wage-employment in a financial year to a rural household whose adult members volunteer to do unskilled manual work.

It has been implemented in this village as well and show significant contribution to the overall development of the village and the life of the people.

== Transport ==
The village is well connected by the means of road and railways. It is adjacent to the NH-11 road (Agra-Jaipur).

=== Road transport ===
140 km from Jaipur on NH-11 (Jaipur-Halena-Newara)

90 km from Agra (Agra-Bharatpur-Halena-Newara)

=== Railway ===
- Agra-Bharatpur line, then by bus from to Newara
- Jaipur-Nadbai or Kherli, then by bus to Chhonkarwada
