= Sarshar =

Sarshar (Persian: سرشار, lit. 'full to the brim or overflowing') is a surname of Persian origins and derived from the compound of "sar" meaning "head" or "top" and "shar" meaning "full" or "abundant", and may refer to:

- Adel Sarshar (born 1992), Iranian football defender
- Allah Baksh Sarshar Uqaili (1907–1971) Pakistani Sufi poet
- Homa Sarshar (born 1946) Iranian and American author, activist, and journalist.
- Hossein Sarshar (1931–1992), Iranian opera singer and film actor
- Ratan Nath Dhar Sarshar (c. 1846–1903) British Indian Urdu novelist, columnist and editor

== See also ==
- Sarwar (disambiguation)
