= Khuian Sarwar =

Khuian Sarwar Khuyan Sarwar
- village
- Location in Punjab, India Khuian Sarwar (India)
- Coordinates: 30.171992°N 74.063559°E
- Country: India
- State: Punjab

Khuian Sarwar is a village in Fazilka district of Punjab, India. It is also the name of a block (sub-tehsil) within the Abohar tehsil. Khuian Sarwar is known for its kinnow, a type of orange. This area is the largest producer of kinnow in Punjab and also known for cultivating cotton crop. The villages under the administration of Khuian Sarawar gram panchayat include:

- Azam Wala
- Achadikki
- Alamgarh
- Bhanger Khera
- Bakkain Wala
- Bazidpur Kattian Wali
- Bareka
- Bandi Wala
- Bodhi Wala Peetha
- Chuhri Wala Dhana
- Dalmir Khera
- Danewala SatKosi
- Diwan Khera
- Dhani Harcharan Singh Randhawa
- Dhani Telupura
- Dangar Khera
- Giddranwali
- Ghumjal
- Ghallu
- Hari Pura alias Bara Tirath
- Jandwala Meera Sangla
- Jandwala Hanuwanta
- DaulatPura alias Jinhanwala
- Koel Khera
- Kabul Shah alias Khuban
- Kallar Khera
- Killianwali Lal Singh
- Khuian Sarwar
- Khipanwali
- Kheowali
- Kattehra
- KhuiKhera Mukha
- Lakhewali Dhab
- Maujgarh
- Muradwala Bhomgir
- Nihal Khera
- Patti Bihla alias Nisripur
- Panniwala Mahla
- Panjawa
- Pattrewala
- PanjKosi
- Rup Nagar alias Rupana
- Ram Sukh Pura
- Ram Kot alias Bhed Kot
- Sarupewala alias Dharam Pura
- Sappan Wali
- Shiwana
- Sayad Wala
- Shateer Wala
- Subhana alias Chattan Wali
- Tutwala
- Tillanwali
- Usman Khera
