= Zille Huma Usman =

Pakistani politician (1971–2007)

Zill-e-Huma Usman

Personal details
- Born: 16 September 1971 Gujranwala, Pakistan
- Died: 20 February 2007 (aged 35) Gujranwala, Pakistan
- Manner of death: Assassination by gunshot
- Occupation: Politician and activist for women's rights
- Known for: Provincial minister for social welfare in Punjab, she was shot and killed on February 20, 2007

Zill-e-Huma Usman (Urdu: ظل ہما عثمان; 16 September 1971 - 20 February 2007) was a Pakistani politician and women's rights activist. She served as a minister during the military dictatorship of Pervez Musharraf until her assassination.

== Personal life ==
Zill-e-Huma earned her LLB in 1997 and later completed her master's degree in political science from the University of the Punjab, Lahore. Usman was married to Dr. Muhammad Usman Haider. They had two sons.

== Career ==
She was the only member of her family involved in politics and was affiliated with the Pakistan Muslim League (Q).

In the 2002 Pakistani general election, Usman contested for a seat in the Provincial Assembly of the Punjab, receiving a significant number of votes. From 2003 to 2006, she served as the parliamentary secretary for development and planning, and in 2006, she was appointed as the minister for social welfare for women.

== Assassination and trial ==
While serving as the Provincial Minister for Social Welfare in Punjab, Usman was shot and killed on 20 February 2007 in Gujranwala, 70 km (43 miles) north of Lahore. She was meeting with party members when a man in the group opened fire, hitting her in the head. Usman was initially taken to a local hospital in Gujranwala but then airlifted to Lahore. She succumbed to her injuries during surgery.

Her assassin, Mohammed Sarwar, was reportedly motivated by what he considered her refusal to adhere to the Islamic code of dress and his opposition to women's involvement in politics. Sarwar had previously been imprisoned for murder and mutilation of four prostitutes and stated in a television interview, “I will kill all those women who do not follow the right path, if I am freed again”. On 20 March 2007, he was sentenced to death. He died of tuberculosis in Central Jail Lahore on 27 January 2012.

== See also ==
- Islamic feminism
