= Sarvari =

Sarvari may refer to:

- Sárvári FC, professional football club in Sárvár, Hungary
- Bharai, also known as Sheikh Sarvari, a Muslim community in India and Pakistan

== People with the given name Sarvari ==
- Sárvári Ferenc (1916–1974), Hungarian name of soccer player Francisc Spielmann

== People with the surname Sarvari ==
- Nasrollah Sarvari (1942–2017), Afghan painter and educator
- Ulrike Sarvari (born 1964), German sprinter

== See also ==
- Sarvar (disambiguation)
