= Mohammed Sarwar (murderer) =

Pakistani serial killer

- Born: 1967; Gujranwala, Pakistan
- Died: January 27, 2012 (aged 44–45); Central Jail Lahore, Lahore, Pakistan
- Other name: Maulvi Ghulam Sarwar
- Conviction: Murder
- Penalty: Death

Details
- Victims: 1–5+
- Span of crimes: 2002–2007
- Country: Pakistan
- State: Punjab
- Date apprehended: 2003 (serial murders); 20 February 2007 (Usman)

Mohammed Sarwar (1967 – 27 January 2012), known as Maulvi Ghulam Sarwar or other variations, was a Pakistani murderer and suspected serial killer who was convicted and sentenced to death for killing politician and activist Zille Huma Usman in 2007. His case gained notoriety due to the fact that Sarwar had previously been acquitted under controversial circumstances for killing at least four prostitutes, for what he considered their disregard for Islamic law. He died of tuberculosis in prison in 2012 while awaiting his execution.

== Early life ==
Sarwar was born in Gujranwala in 1967. While little is known of his upbringing, his neighbors claimed that he was greatly influenced by his mother, a very religious woman who strictly adhered to the Ahl-i Hadith sect's teachings and observed purdah. After graduating from PB Model School, he attended various madrasas and eventually became a preacher who taught at local mosques. He lived with his wife and nine children in the district of Baghbanpura.

When he was not preaching, Sarwar ran a small store in the Daal Bazaar, where he was noted for refusing to sell any merchandise to women who did not wear the hijab. He also regularly attended sermons by Hafiz Saeed, the founder of Lashkar-e-Taiba, but it is unclear whether he was a member of the organization itself. Despite this, the only time Sarwar got into trouble before his killings was on two occasions, where he fired a gun into the air to scare off eunuchs who were attempting to hold celebrations near his home.

== Murders and acquittal ==
Between 3 November 2002 and January 2003, at least four prostitutes were killed in Gujranwala and Lahore, and several others left injured or permanently damaged from the attacks. The perpetrator's modus operandi was to either shoot or stab the victims just above the crotch, and then leave them to bleed out. In early 2003, Sarwar was arrested and charged with the murders, proudly proclaiming that he had killed at least twelve women in these several months because they were "immoral" and went against the teachings of Islam.

Despite his detailed confessions and evidence pointing towards his guilt, the case collapsed and he was acquitted on all charges, with the verdict celebrated by his supporters. The police later released a statement claiming that this decision came about since the victims' family members had accepted diyāt and that Sarwar was diagnosed by a prison psychiatrist as "normal, but religiously fanatical." This came under heavy scrutiny by parts of the media and the less radically Islamic sections of the country, who claimed that the family members and witnesses were intimidated into dropping the charges by wealthy patrons and members of the local clergy who supported Sarwar's extremist views, and had even helped him set up business as a locksmith after his release. Later on, Sarwar's own lawyer, Liaqat Sindhu, revealed that he himself knew his client was guilty, but said that the acquittal was the result of a lack of strong evidence and mishandling by the prosecution.

== Murder of Zille Huma Usman ==
On 20 February 2007, Sarwar attended a gathering in Gujranwala where Zille Huma Usman, the then-Provincial Minister for Social Welfare, was addressing party members on new policies. After questioning her attire, he drew a firearm and shot her in the head, inflicting fatal injuries. Usman succumbed to her wounds in the hospital.

Following the attack, Sarwar remained composed, surrendering to authorities and declaring that he was fulfilling his "duty" by eliminating an "immoral" woman. While police investigated potential ties to extremist groups, no such affiliations were found.

The assassination was swiftly condemned by President Pervez Musharraf, Prime Minister Shaukat Aziz, and members of Parliament. One female senator controversially called for the murder of Sarwar's female relatives in retaliation. Religious scholars and leaders also denounced the act, though some attributed it either to insanity or foreign interference rather than his prior criminal record.

== Trial, imprisonment and death ==
Shortly after the killing, Sarwar was charged with Usman's murder before the Anti Terrorism Court, where he pleaded not guilty. On 21 March he was convicted, with Justice Tariq Iftikhar sentencing him to death along with a substantial fine.

Following his conviction, Sarwar was incarcerated at Central Jail Lahore, where he remained on death row. Over the years, he developed tuberculosis, which progressively worsened, leading to his death on 27 January 2012. Some police officials raised suspicions regarding the circumstances of his death, though no conclusive evidence ever emerged.
