= Sunehri Kothi, Tonk =

Sunehri Kothi

General information
- Location: Tonk, Rajasthan, India
- Owner: Nawab Mohammed Ibrahim Ali Khan

Sunehri Kothi (Mansion of Gold) is a magnificent hall in the city of Tonk in the Indian state of Rajasthan.

The hall is within the old palace complex, whose walls and ceilings are one sumptuous expanse of enamel mirror-work, gilt and painted glass illuminated through stained-glass windows from Belgium. The entire effect is that of an exquisite piece of enamel jewellery blown up to the size of a hall.

It was built by Nawab Mohammed Ibrahim Ali Khan (1867–1930), the Nawab of Tonk, for poetry recitals, dance and music.
