= Shri Narsinghji Temple =

Sri Narasimha Temple, Amber
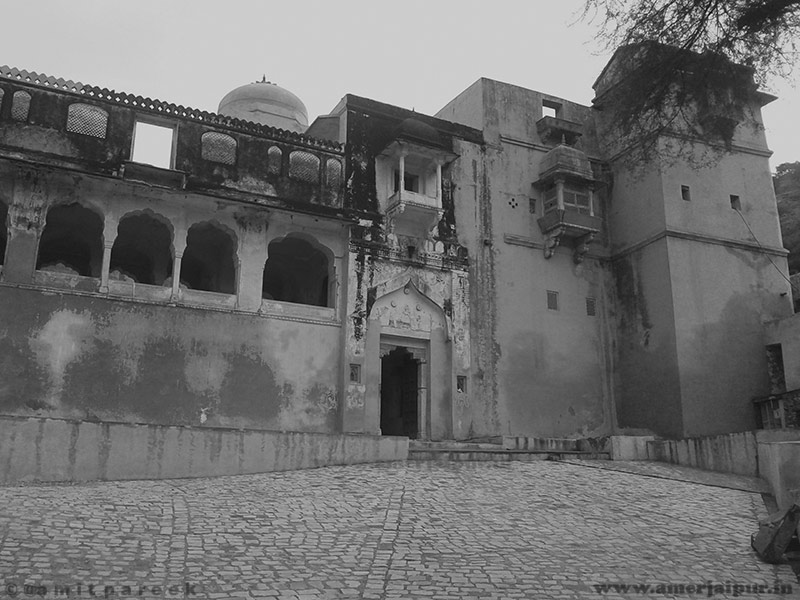

Religion
- Affiliation: Hinduism
- District: Jaipur

Location
- Location: Amber
- State: Rajasthan
- Country: India

Sri Narasimha Temple, Amber is located in Amber, Jaipur, India. It is situated near to the down side of the Amber Fort. Sri Narasimha Temple is in the first and old Amber palace and built by the Kachhwaha dynasty and kings of Amber. Originally, it was used by the Meena tribe.Sri Narasimha Temple, Amber is known for its historical story and its architecture.
