= Nur Chashma =

Palace built for hunting by Mughal Emperor Jahangir

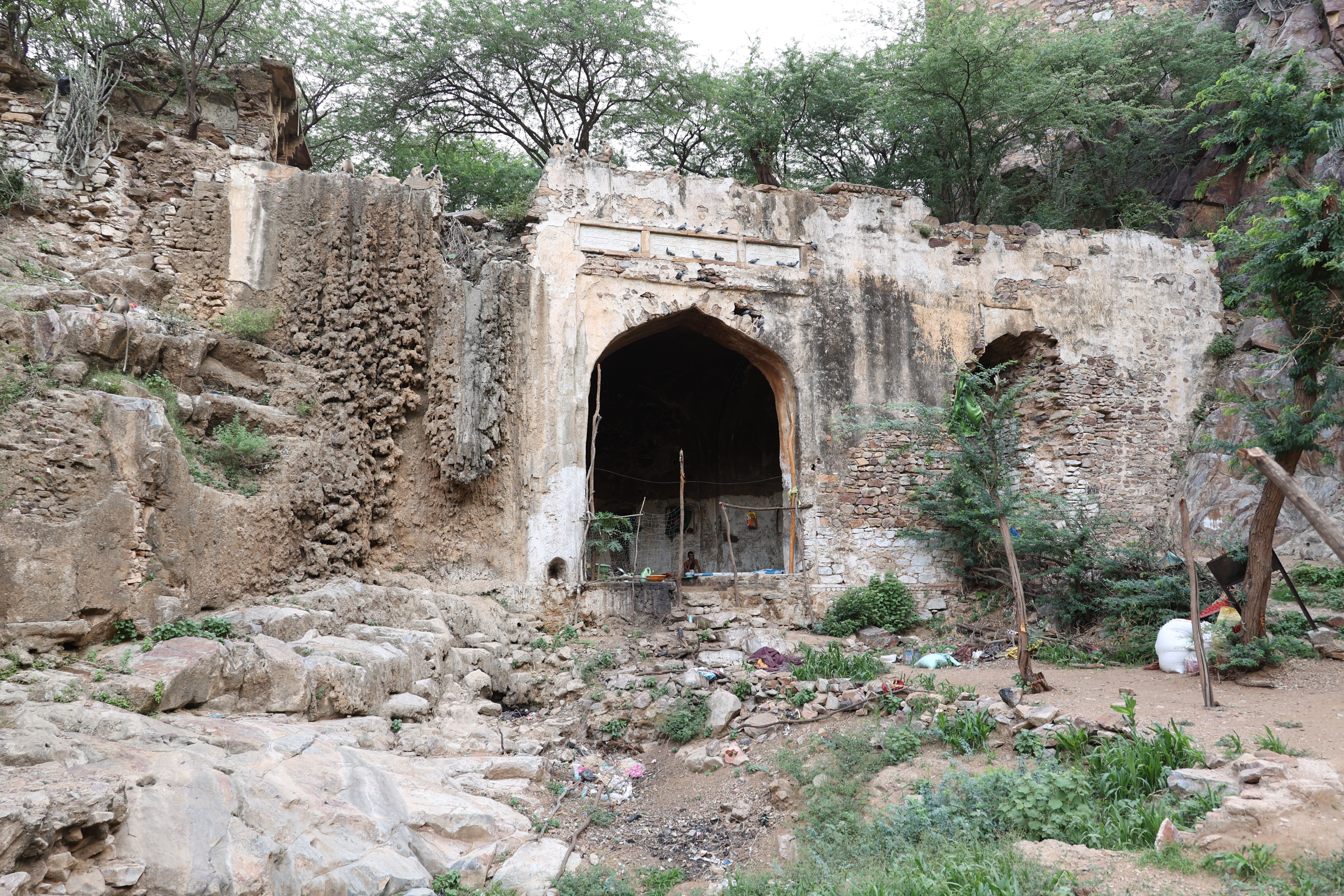
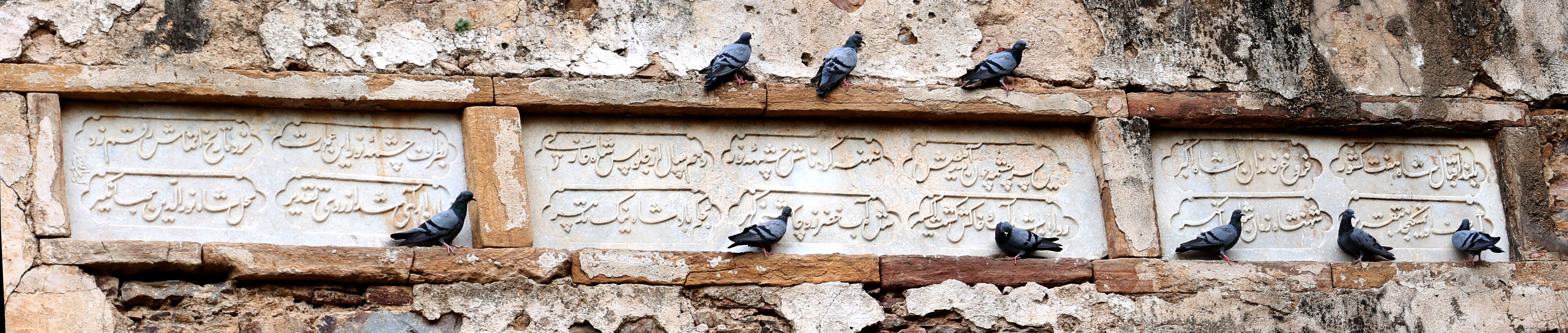
- Chashma i Nur: Lower Building, Inscription
- Interactive map of the Nur Chashma area

General information
- Status: Ruined
- Location: Ajmer, India
- Completed: 1615
- Owner: Mughal Emperor Jahangir

Design and construction
- Known for: Hunting palace

Nur Chashma is a palace built by Mughal Emperor Jahangir for hunting in 1615 and christened the place Chashma-i-Nur (چشما نور – spring of light), after his own name, Nur-uddin Mohammad Jahangir. It is situated in present-day Ajmer, India and is now just a ruined pavilion.

== History ==
Hafiz Jamal, the daughter of Khawaja Muinuddin Chisti, lived for some time as a religious recluse here. Jahangir came to Ajmer in 1613 A.D. and built a hunting palace here and named it Mahal Shah Nur-ud-din Jahangir (̠Palace of King Jahangir).

Jahangir lived in Ajmer for nearly three years (1613 to 1619 A.D.) The Emperor himself describes the place in Tuzuk-i-Jahangiri and ordered a palace to be built in the valley and some couplets to inscribed on a stone and the stone to be fixed over the arch of the lower building. Sir Thomas Roe also describe this place as a 'Place of melancholy delight' in his Journal.

There is another historical important relics, the massive unfinished water lift, now known "Roothi Rani Ka Mahal" as built by Rao Maldeva of Merwar, who took Ajmer in 1535 A.D. The lift was consist of a chains of towers, one overlooking the other, and the water was to be raised from the Chashma to the fort of Taragarh.

The Chashma valley widens a little towards the end and it was here that the historic Battle of Ajmer fought between Dara Shikoh and Aurangzeb and decided the fate of the rightful heir of Shah Jahan.
