= Mandal, Rajasthan =

Mandal
- Town
- Location in Rajasthan state of India.
- Coordinates: 25°26′21″N 74°35′04″E
- Country: India

Area
  - Total: 1,219 km^{2} (471 sq mi)

Population (2011)
  - Total: 17,391
  - Density: 14.27/km^{2} (36.95/sq mi)

Languages
- Time zone: UTC+5:30 (IST)

== Introduction ==
Mandal is a town and tehsil in the Bhilwara district of the Indian state of Rajasthan. It is located approximately 15 km north of Bhilwara city and serves as an administrative center in the region.

== History ==
Mandal has historical significance dating back to the medieval period. The region is believed to have been used as a military encampment during the Mughal Empire's campaigns in Mewar, particularly during the siege of Chittorgarh. Remains of historical structures, including watchtowers and ruins, can still be found in the area.

Before Indian independence, the region was part of princely states such as Banera and Badnor, which later merged into the state of Rajasthan in 1949.

== Geography ==
Mandal is situated in southeastern Rajasthan within Bhilwara district. The tehsil spans an area of approximately 1,200 square kilometers. The region has a semi-arid climate with hot summers, moderate monsoon rainfall, and mild winters.

== Demographics ==
According to the 2011 Census of India, Mandal town has a population of around 17,000, while the Mandal tehsil has a population exceeding 230,000.

The literacy rate in Mandal town is around 70%, while the tehsil has a lower literacy rate. The majority of the population practices Hinduism, followed by Islam and Jainism.

== Economy ==
The local economy is primarily based on agriculture, with major crops including wheat, maize, and pulses. Animal husbandry also plays a significant role in rural livelihoods.

Due to its proximity to Bhilwara, known as the "Textile City of India", Mandal benefits from trade and employment opportunities linked to the textile industry.

== Culture ==
Mandal is known for its traditional fairs and cultural practices. One of the notable events is the annual donkey fair (Vaishakh Nandan Mela), held after Diwali during Govardhan Puja.

The region also preserves traditional folk performances, including Nahar Nritya, a local dance form performed during festive occasions. The dance is typically associated with rural celebrations and reflects the cultural heritage of the Bhilwara region. Performers often wear traditional attire and enact symbolic movements representing strength and community traditions.

The fair is traditionally organized by the Prajapati community and includes trading, decoration competitions, and races involving donkeys.

== Places of interest ==
- Battis Khambon ki Chhatri – A historic cenotaph known for its architectural design
- Meja Dam – A nearby reservoir and local tourist attraction
- Mandal Talab – A local pond that serves as a water resource and gathering place for residents. It is an important part of the town's landscape and is associated with daily activities and seasonal usage.
- Various temples and heritage structures in and around the town

== Administration ==
Mandal serves as a tehsil headquarters and is governed under the Panchayati Raj system. It falls under a legislative assembly constituency in Rajasthan.

== Transport ==
Mandal is connected by road to Bhilwara and surrounding towns. The nearest railway station is located in Bhilwara. The nearest airports are in Udaipur and Jaipur.
