= Bharai =

Muslim community in India and Pakistan

Bharai are a Muslim community found in Pakistan and India. They are settled in Punjab province and Karachi in Pakistan and the states of Himachal Pradesh and Punjab in India. They are also known as Parahin and in Uttar Pradesh, the Bharai are also commonly known as Sheikh Sarwari.

Like other Faqir groups, the Sarwari started off as a Sufi order, the Sarwari Qadiriyya. The word sarvar means ‘leader’, ‘chief’, and ‘master’ in the Persian language, and the Sarwari order was said to be founded by Sultan Bahoo, a Sufi of Punjab.

== Present circumstances ==
The Bharai are now mainly settled agriculturists. Many Bharai are involved in rearing cattle, and the community are considered fairly skilled in this activity. Important subsidiary occupation includes service in the army, police and forestry service.
