= Fateh Jang Gumbad Alwar =

Tomb in Rajasthan

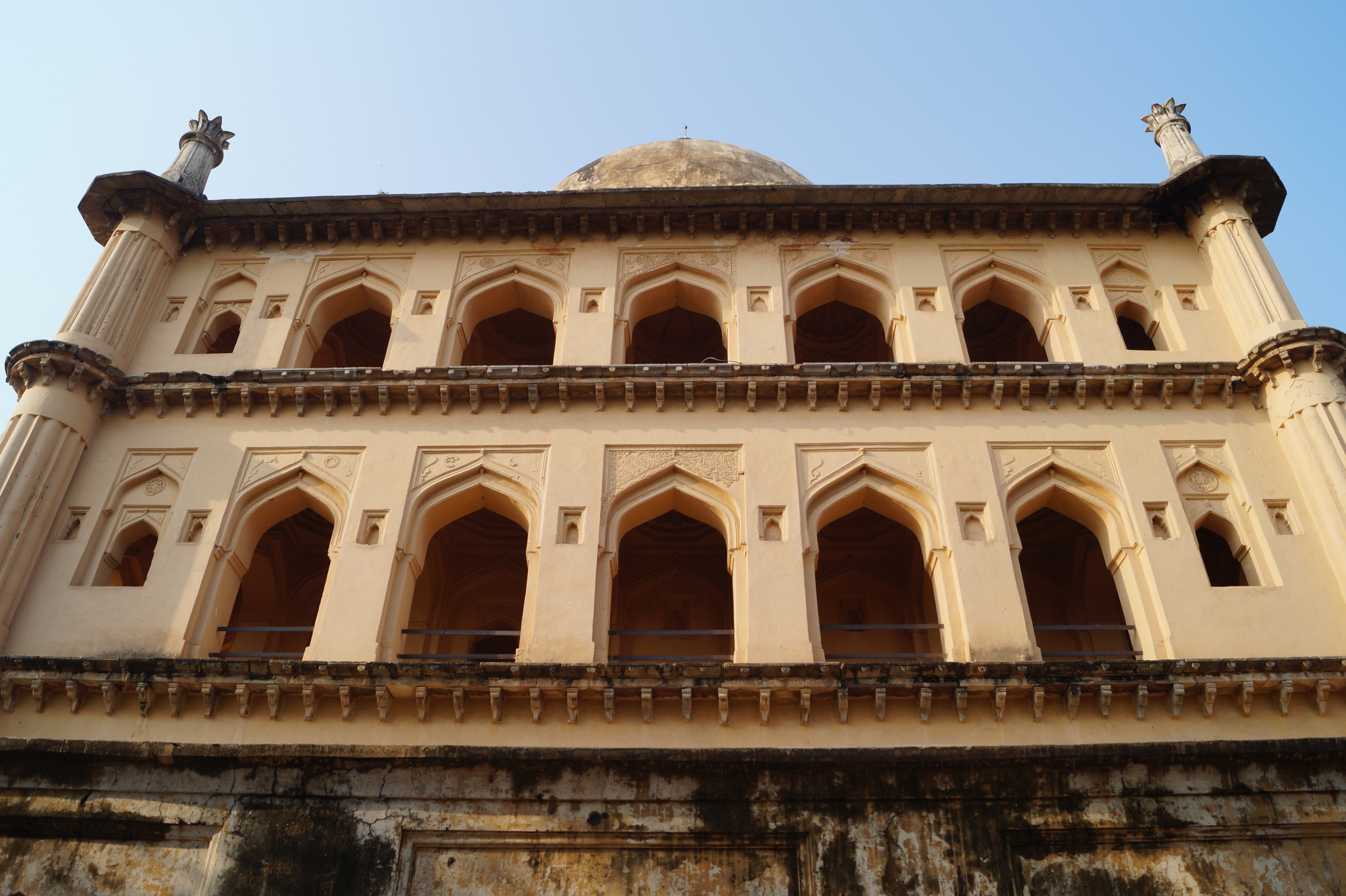
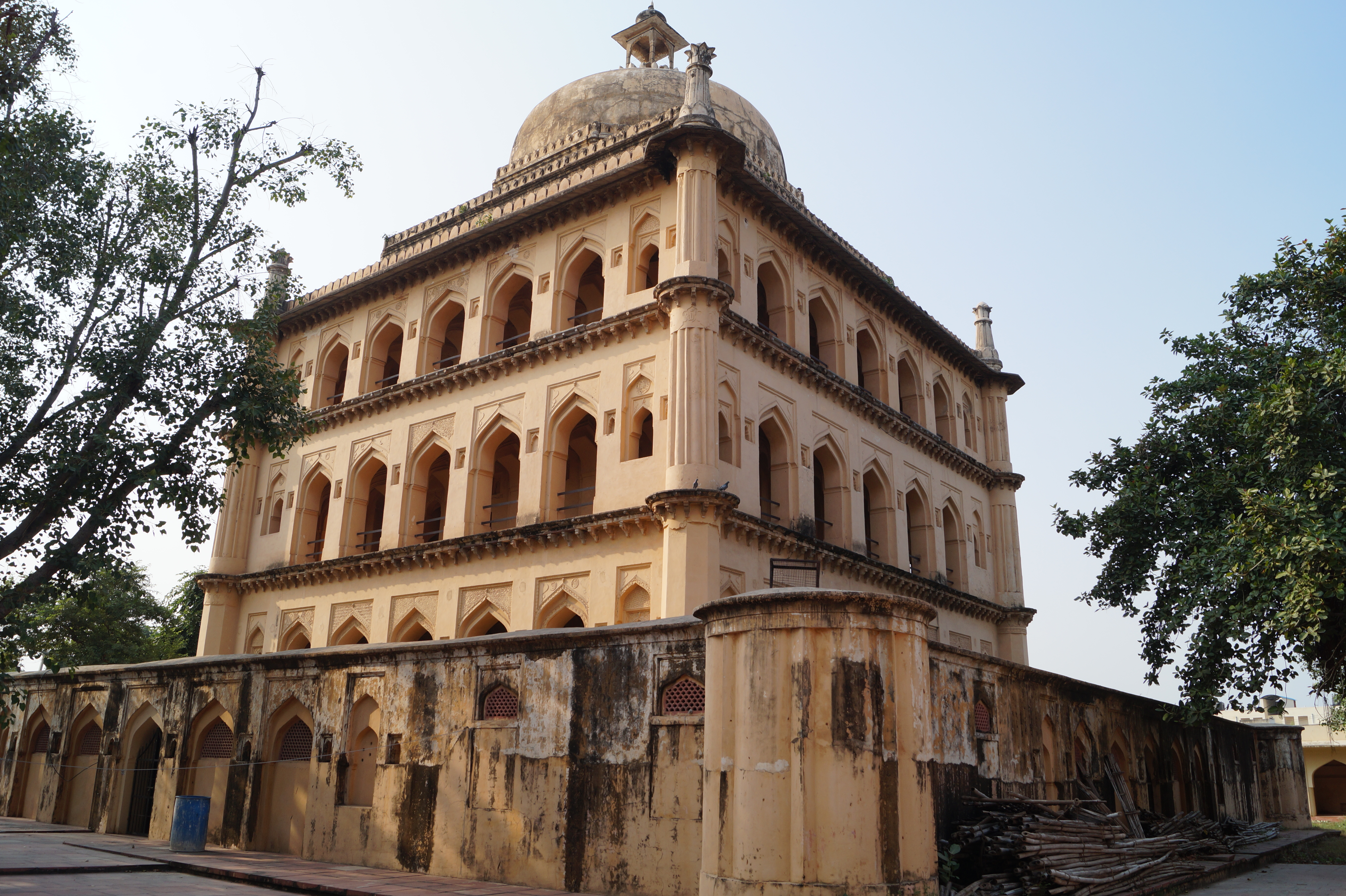
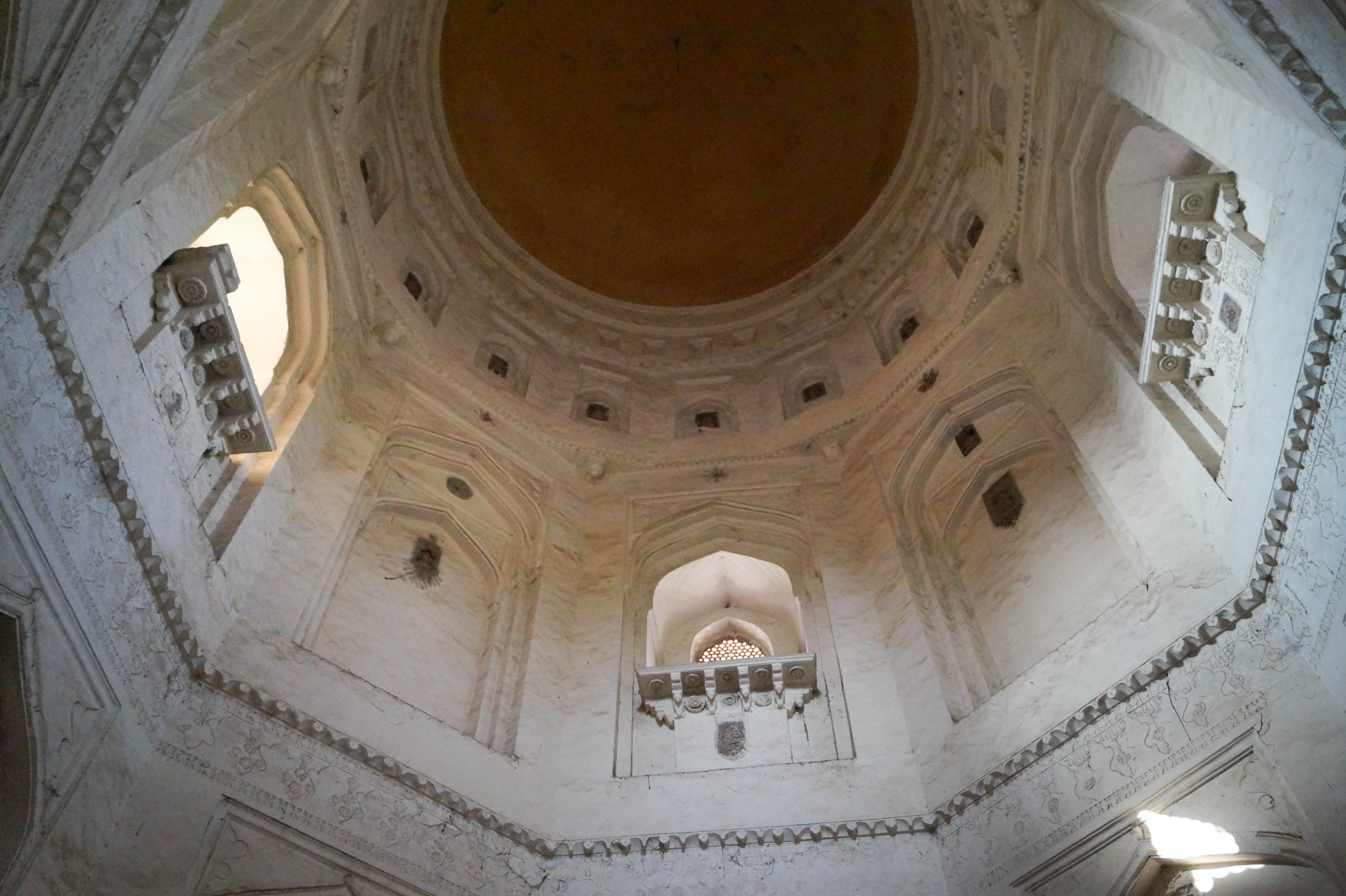
- Front view, Side view, Interior view
- Interactive map of Fateh Jang Gumbad Alwar
- Location: Alwar District, Rajasthan, India
- Type: Tomb
- Material: Sandstone
- Dedicated to: Fateh Jang

Fateh Jang Gumbad Alwar, also known as Fateh Jang ka Gumabd or The tomb of Fateh Jang, is a popular tourist attraction in Alwar city in Rajasthan state of India. The monument is dedicated to Fateh Jang, who was a minister to Mughal Emperor Shah Jahan and was a governor of Alwar, who died in 1647.

This historical tomb, near Alwar railway station and the tourist office, suffers from a lack of maintenance. The upper part of the Fateh Jung dome is weak and could collapse at any time. At a result, the movement of tourists has been banned.

== History ==
The tomb of Fateh Jang was constructed in the year 1647. Fateh Jang was a Pathan warrior and he was also related to the Khanzada rulers of Alwar, Rajasthan.

== Architecture ==
The tomb of Fateh Jang has five storeys, three of which are 60 feet in size, square shaped, and of the same breadth, with seven openings on each face, and there are four octagonal minars at the four corners. The design of the tomb depicts the fusion of Mughal and Rajput architectural styles.

This tomb is a blend of different styles of architecture. It is decorated by a huge dome, and the minarets enhance its beauty. The walls and ceiling have plaster coating, and some fine Quranic inscriptions can be seen on the first floor.

This monument is maintained by the Archaeological Survey of India. There is a small garden surrounding the tomb and some information about its history on a sign board.

== See also ==
- Bala Quila, also known as Alwar Fort, is a fort in Alwar.
- Mehrangarh Fort covers an area of 1,200 acres (486 hectares) in Jodhpur.
- Bhangarh Fort is a 16th-century fort in Rajasthan.
