= Akbari Fort & Museum =

Museum in Ajmer

Coordinates: 26.4607°N 74.6335°E

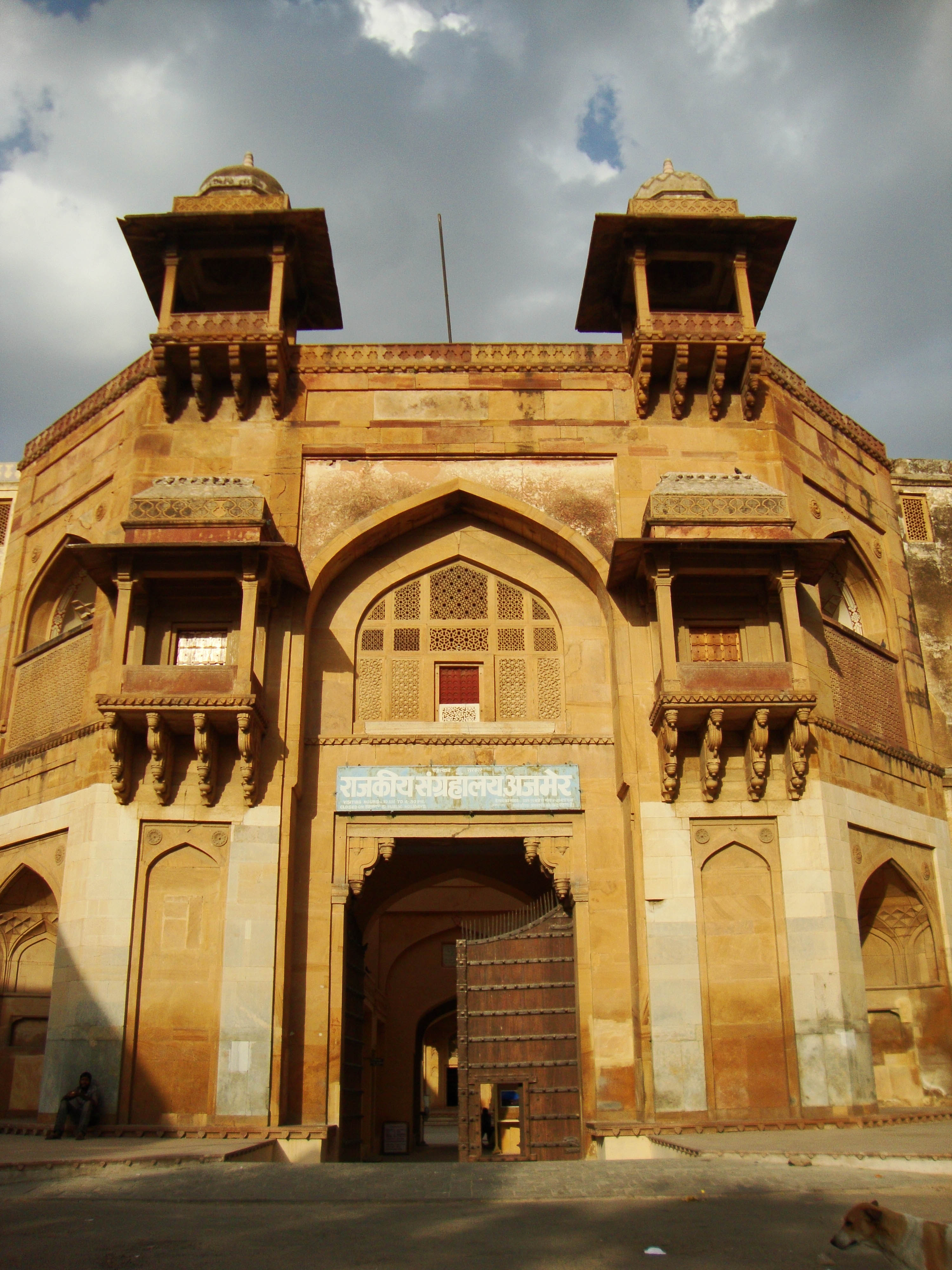
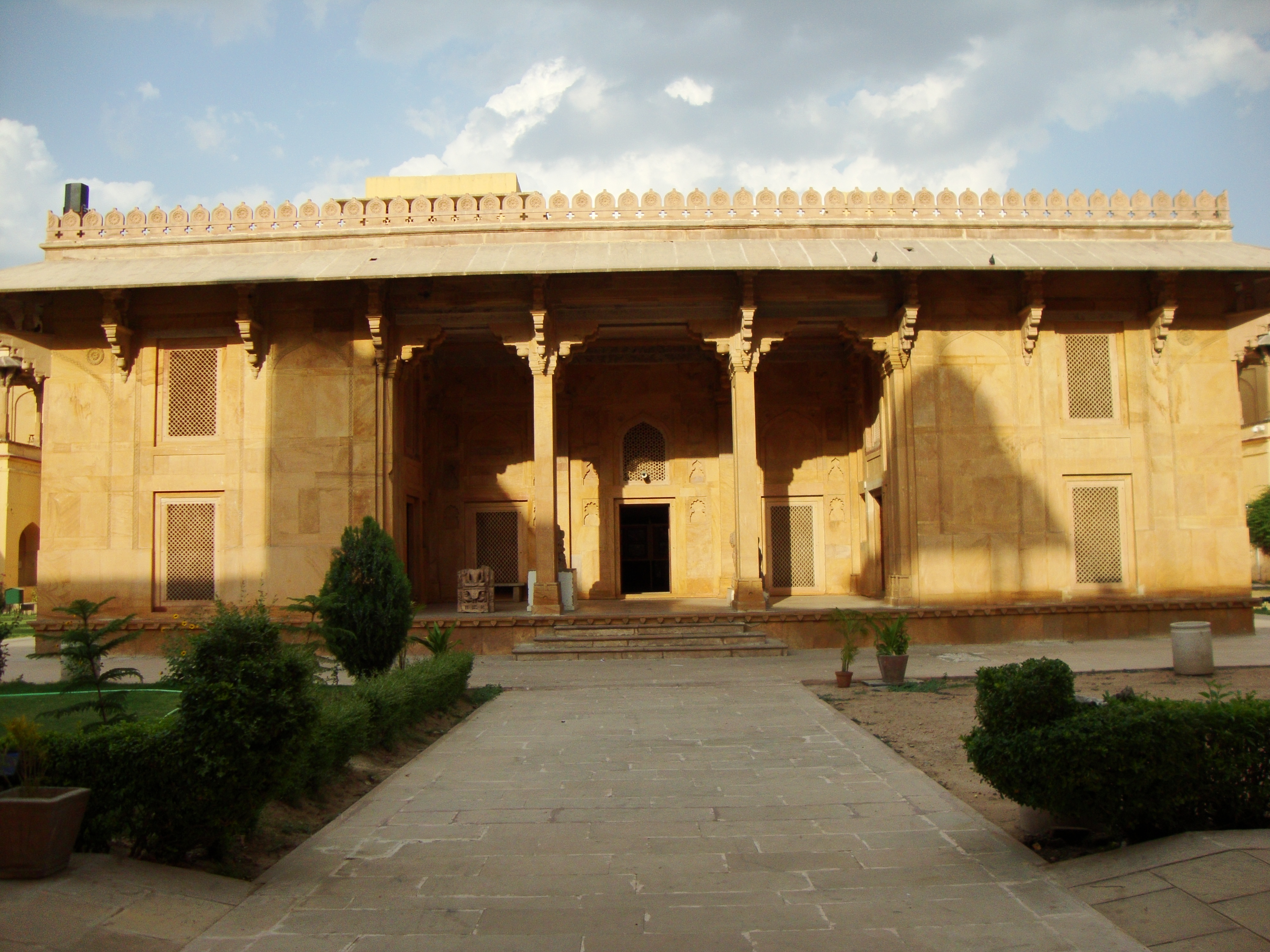
- Main Entrance of Akbar's Fort Main Entrance, Full view Akbar's Fort
- Established: 1570
- Location: Ajmer, Rajasthan, India
- Type: Historical museum
- Collections: Mughal and Rajput armor, sculpture, antiquities
- Founder: Akbar
- Curator: U C Bhattacharya (1936–1961)
- Owners: Department of Archaeology and Museums, Government of Rajasthan

Akbari Fort & Museum is a museum in Ajmer. It has been named Rajputana Museum. It was once the residence of Prince Salīm, the son of the Emperor Akbar, and presently houses a collection of Mughal and Rajput armor and sculpture. Construction of this had been commissioned by Akbar in 1570. This is the location from where Salim, as the Emperor Jahangir read out the farmân permitting the British East India Company to trade with India.

== History of the fort ==
The historical Ajmer fort where the museum is housed is popularly called Akbari fort as it was constructed by Mughal emperor Akbar to honour the sufi saint Khwaja Moin-ud-din Chisti. This was the fort where Jahangir met Sir Thoma Roe, a milestone meeting that paved the path of British presence in India.

=== Reason for construction ===
- Military - It was built for advancing Mughal armies.
- Palace - It was a resting place for Emperor Akbar during his visits to Garib Nawaz in Ajmer.
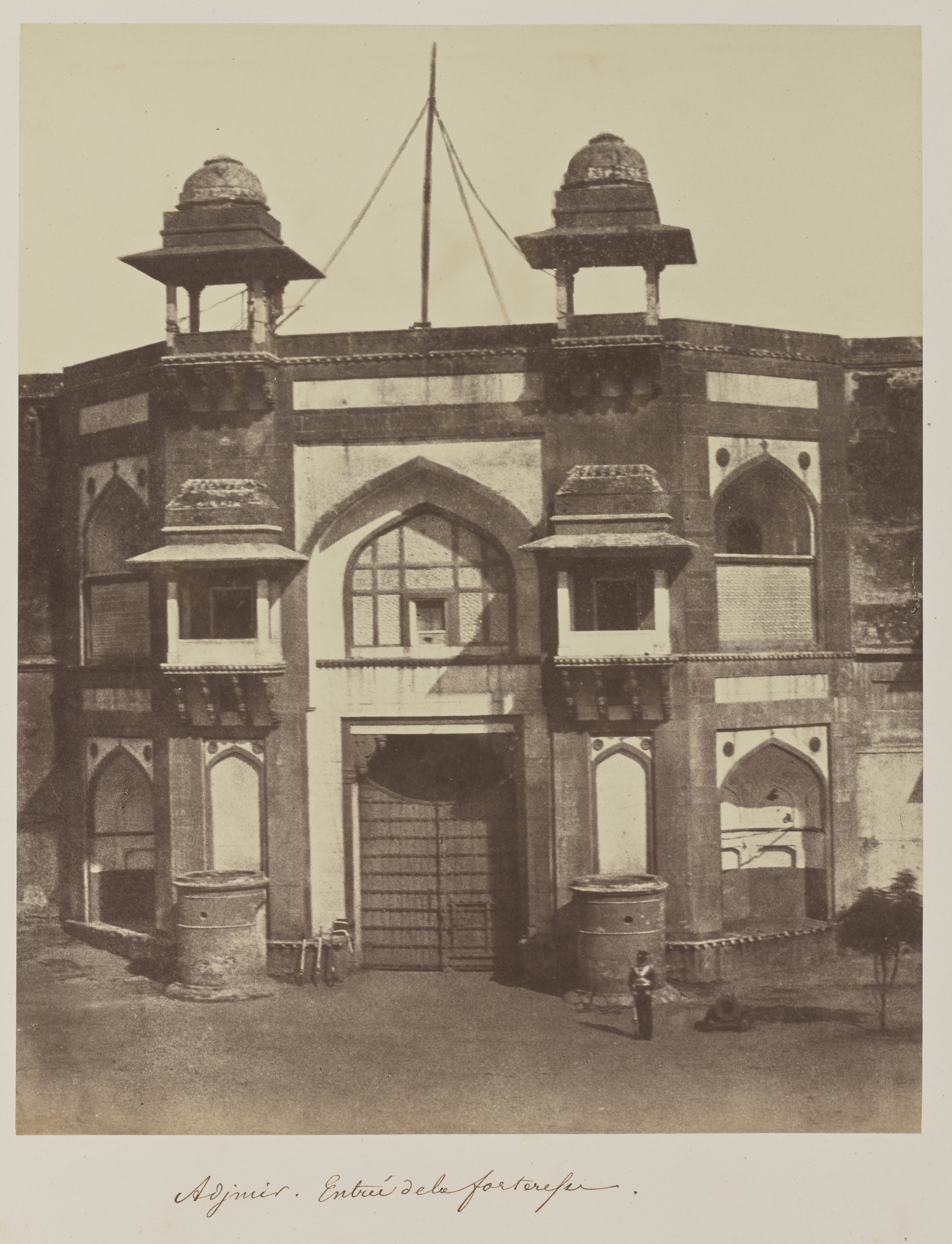
  Adjmir, Entrée de la forteresse. negative 1849 - 1851; print 1851, The J. Paul Getty Museum, Los Angeles
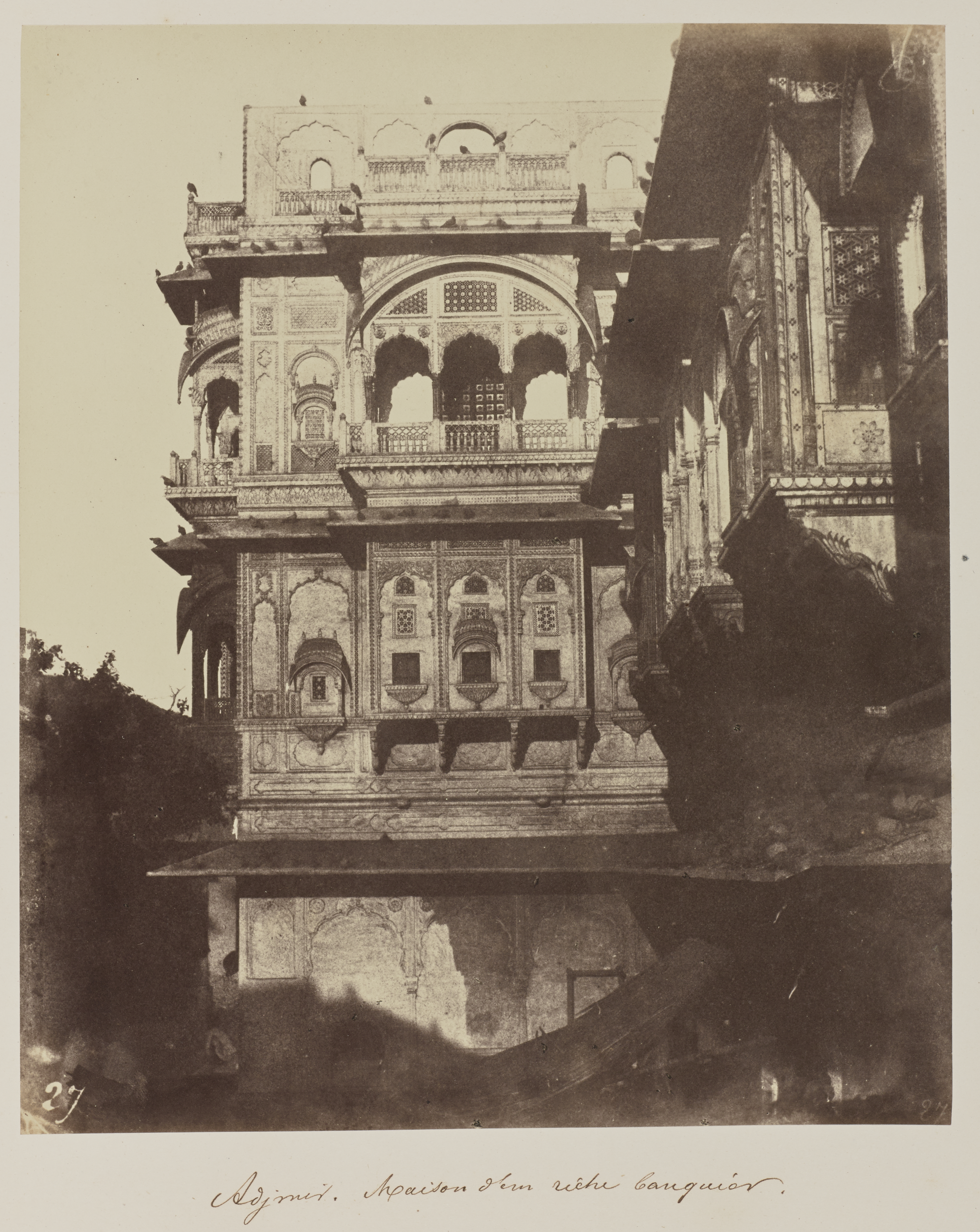
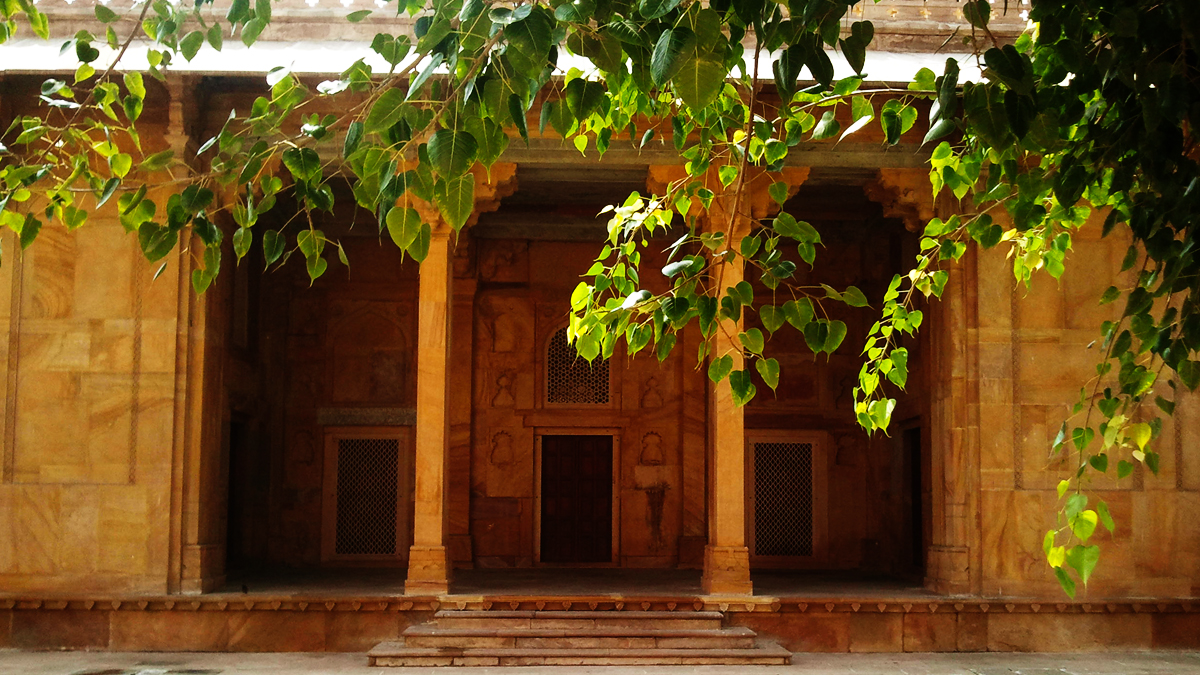
  Audience Hall, Ajmer Fort
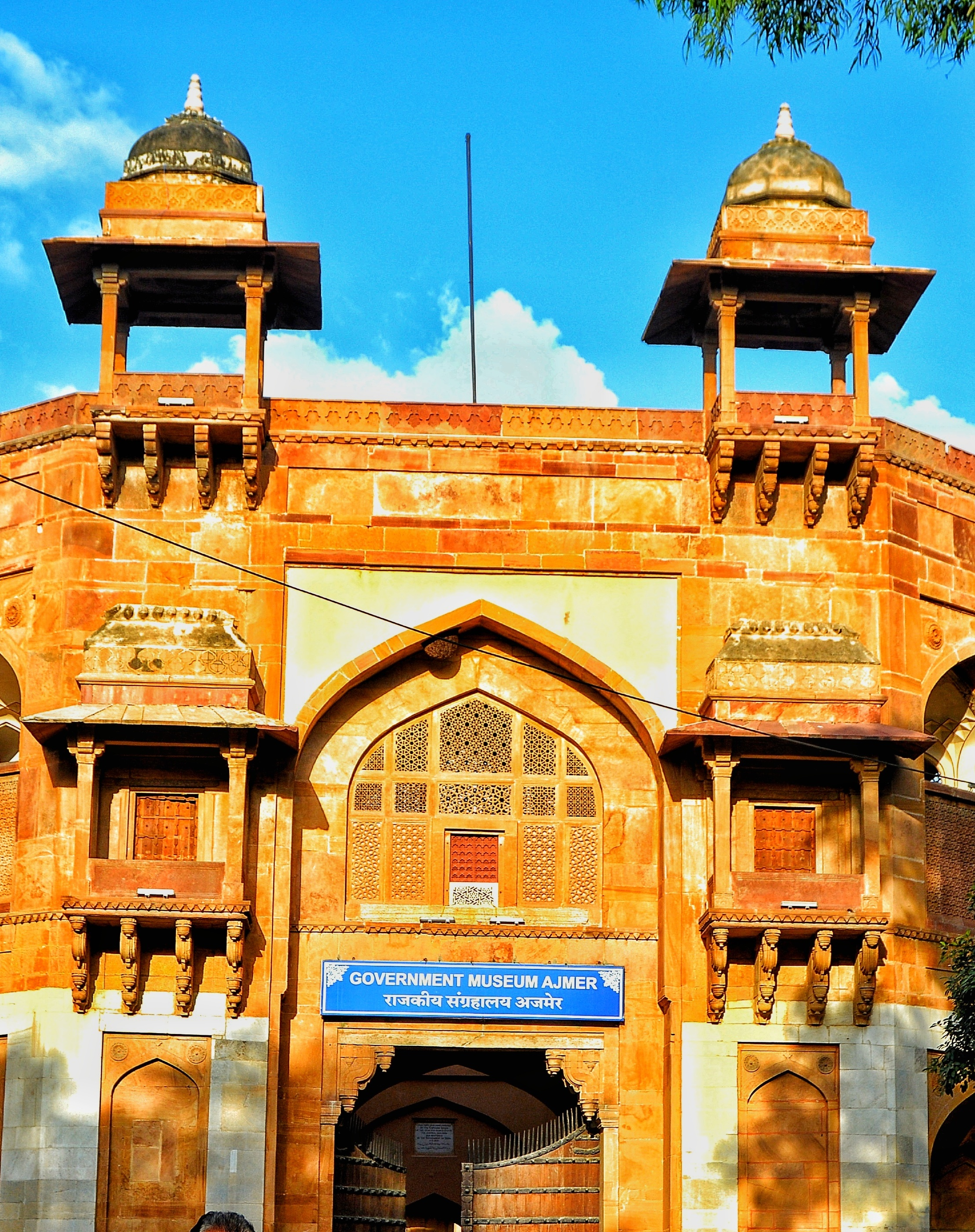
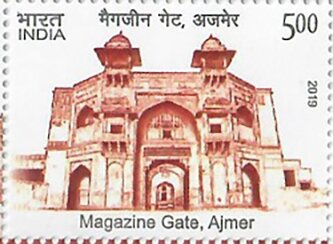

== Museum ==
Rajputana Museum, Ajmer has a rich collection of antiquities because of generous contributions by royal houses, elites, and local chieftains. Later, archeological artefacts of the region enhanced the collection.

Unlike the rest of Rajputana, which consisted of princely states, Ajmer-Merwada region came under direct British rule. In early 20th century, the British thought of establishing a regional museum for the region of Rajputana at Ajmer. John Marshall, who was Director General of Archaeology of India at the time, made a proposal for the Ajmer museum. On 19 October, Sit Elliot Colvin, agent to governor general in Rajputana inaugurated the museum.

Many other notable contributors developed the museum. Historian Gauri Shankar Hira Chand Ojha, as the first curator of this museum, travelled extensively to collect precious artefacts for the museum. Sir Alexander Cunningham, A C L Carlleyle, D R Bhandarkar and R D Bannerjee, in their capacity as archeologists at Archaeological Survey of India, contributed extensively in building the collection. After Ojha, U C Bhattacharya took over the task of curating this museum from 1936 to 1961. His effort to collect antiquities were successful in enriching the collection.

D R Bhandarkar carried out excavations at Nagari in Chittor region in 1915-1916. Remains of ancient city Madhyamika were unearthed and many unique objects were housed in the museum. A big hoard of coins from Sarvania, ancient Banswar, Inscribed stone inscriptions, specimens of textile, weapons, local crafts also form part of the museum's collection.

In 1956, integration of Rajasthan was completed with integration of Ajmer-Merwada region. Henceforth, the museum came under the Department of Archaeology and Museums, Government of Rajasthan.

=== Galleries ===
Excavated Artefacts

Sculpture
