= Sarvar, Bhopal =

Sarvar
- village
- Location within Madhya Pradesh Location within India
- Coordinates: 23.147317°N 77.301972°E
- Country: India
- State: Madhya Pradesh
- District: Bhopal
- Tehsil: Huzur

Population (2011)
  - Total: 1,265
- Time zone: UTC+5:30 (IST)
- ISO 3166 code: MP-IN
- Census code: 482502

Sarvar is a village in the Bhopal district of Madhya Pradesh, India. It is located in the Huzur tehsil and the Phanda block.

== Demographics ==
According to the 2011 census of India, Sarvar has 328 households. The effective literacy rate (i.e. the literacy rate of population excluding children aged 6 and below) is 62.69%.

Demographics (2011 Census)
	Total	Male	Female
Population	1265	684	581
Children aged below 6 years	209	104	105
Scheduled caste	43	23	20
Scheduled tribe	431	236	195
Literates	662	411	251
Workers (all)	601	367	234
Main workers (total)	503	316	187
Main workers: Cultivators	80	68	12
Main workers: Agricultural labourers	129	73	56
Main workers: Household industry workers	6	6	0
Main workers: Other	288	169	119
Marginal workers (total)	98	51	47
Marginal workers: Cultivators	7	6	1
Marginal workers: Agricultural labourers	73	37	36
Marginal workers: Household industry workers	6	1	5
Marginal workers: Others	12	7	5
Non-workers	664	317	347
