= Dhanop =

- village
- Country: India
- State: Rajasthan

Government
  - Body: Gram panchayat

Languages
  - Official: Hindi
- Time zone: UTC+5:30 (IST)
- PIN: 311023

Dhanop is an ancient village in Bhilwara district on Shahpur-Vijainagar state highway at a distance of 85 km from Bhilwara city in Rajasthan. Its PIN code is 311023. Dhanop village is in Phooliya Kalan tehsil(pin code 311407). It had a population of 3,592 at the 2001 census, out of them 616 are Scheduled Caste and 30 Scheduled tribe people. It is known for Dhanop sheetla Mata Temple.
