= Dangar Khera =

Indian village in the Fazilka district

- Village
- Country: India
- State: Panjab
- District: Fazilka district
- Tahsil: Abohar
- Founded in: 1783 CE
- Founder: Netaram, Sarsaram, Kanaram & Phoolaram Kargwal
- Sarpanch: Mrs. Shefali Tak

Government
  - Type: Panchayati Raj
  - Body: Sarpanch

Area
  - Total: 1,614 ha (3,990 acres)
  - Water: 2.97 ha (7.35 acres)
  - Rural (Settlement area): 55 ha (135 acres)
- Elevation: 188 m (617 ft)
- Demonym: Dangarkhedia
- PIN: 152122
- Telephone Code: 01638
- Vehicle registration: PB22

Dangar Khera or Danger Khera, is a village in India, located in the Fazilka district in the state of Panjab. It was founded by Kesaram's 4 Sons Named (Netaram, Sarsaram, Kanaram & Phoolaram Kargwal) in the year 1783 CE. It is known as the village of 'Adhyapaks' in Panjab. Because a total of 450 people got government jobs till year of 2022, 250 of them are teachers. As of 2023, the village has 1171 households with an estimated population of 6,251.

== Origin of its name ==
Dangar Khera is an area with a naturally high water level where water remains in the village pond throughout the year. In ancient times, animals were naturally drawn to this area to drink water, especially during the summer season. Consequently, the village was named after the herds of animals frequently seen around the pond. 'Dangar' is a Panjabi term for animal. The pond currently occupies 7-8 acres of land, but in the past, it spanned four times its present size.

== Schools ==
=== Govt. Primary Smart School ===
G.P.S.S. (DANGAR KHERA) was established in the year 1951 CE and is managed by the Department of Education. The school consists of grades from 1 to 5. The school follows a curriculum prescribed by the government, covering a wide range of subjects.

=== Govt. Senior Secondary Smart School ===
G.S.S.S.S. (DANGAR KHERA) was established in the year 1956 CE and is managed by the Department of Education. The school consists of Grades from 6 to 12.

== Demographics ==
=== Language ===
Bagri is the major language spoken by the people followed by Panjabi.

=== Population ===
According to the 2011 census of India, Dangar Khera has an estimated population of 6251, with 3333 males and 2918 females.

=== Literacy rate ===
In 2011, the literacy rate of Dangar Khera was 71.62%.

== Religious shrines ==
=== Basantī Mātā Mandir ===
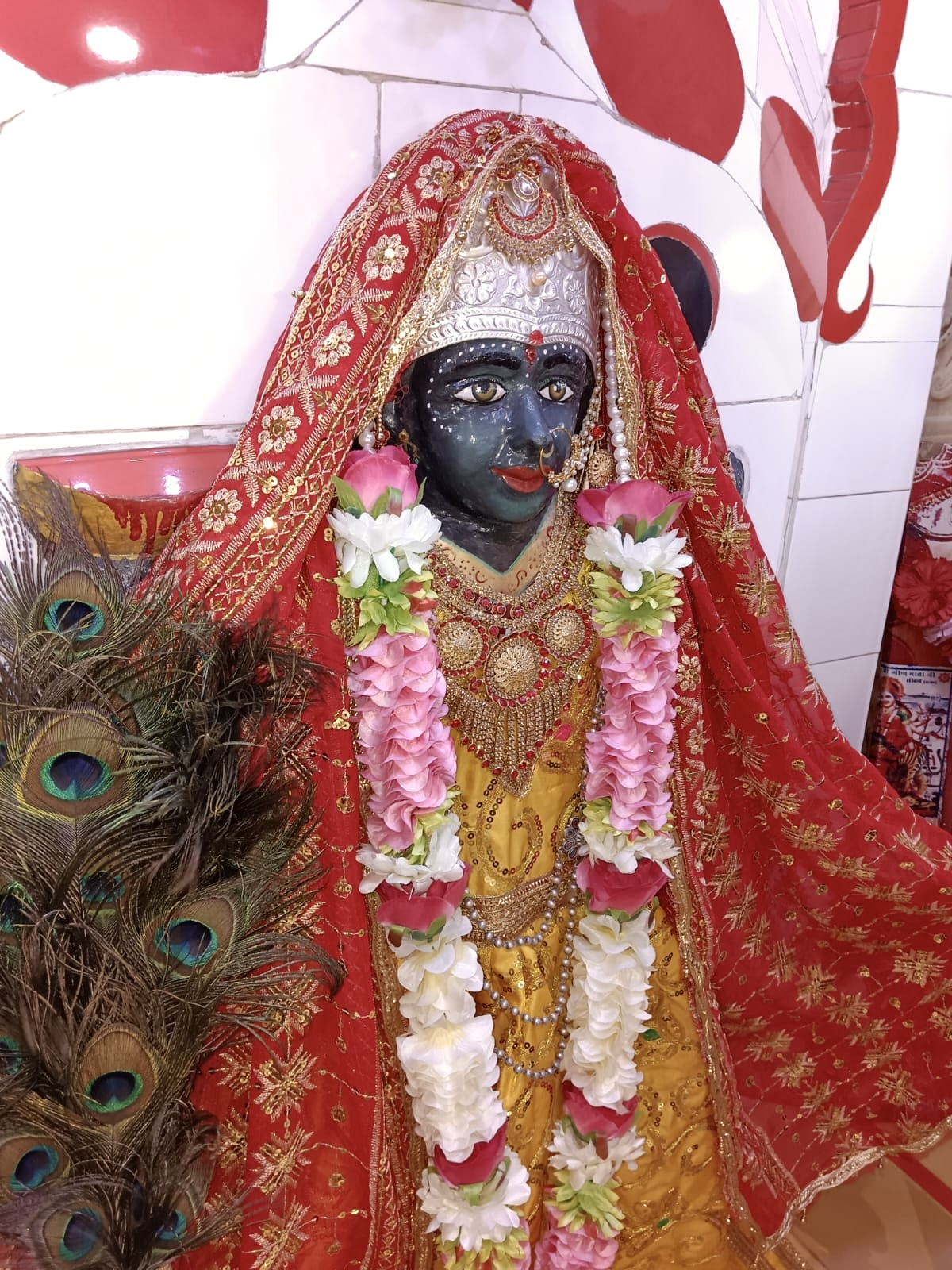
Idol of "Goddess Basanti"

The Basantī Mātā Mandir is a Hindu Temple located in Dangar Khera. To protect against the Spanish Flu pandemic on 27 November 1918 CE, the Mata Basanti Mandir was established by Ch. Bhādar Singh Kāragwāl (Numberdār). Previously, there was a farm where this temple now stands. People believe in Basantī Mātā and worship them. Every month, on the day of Amavasya, a fair is held and a Bhandara is organized by the Mandir committee. This event is attended by a large number of devotees from nearby areas and beyond.

=== Gurdwara Sahib ===
There is a Gurdwara Sahib in Dangar Khera. People go to the Gurdwara Sahib early morning every day. The Gurdwara has a langar hall where people can eat free lacto-vegetarian food served by volunteers at the Gurdwara.

== Culture ==
People of this village celebrate Holi, Diwali, Gurpurab, Gangaur (Gaur), Teej & Lohri as their religious festivals.

== Climate ==
Dangar Khera's temperature generally ranges from 4.1 to 41°C (39.4 to 105.8°F) in a typical year. January is the coldest month, and June is the warmest. Precipitation peaks in August, which has an average rainfall of 169.9 mm (6.69 in). December is the driest month, with only 8.9 mm (0.35 in) of rainfall. Dangar Khera's temperature generally ranges from 4.1 to 41 °C (39.4 to 105.8 °F) in a typical year. January is the coldest month, and June is the warmest. Precipitation peaks in August, which has an average rainfall of 169.9 mm (6.69 in). December is the driest month, with only 8.9 mm (0.35 in) of rainfall.

== Agriculture ==
These are the crops grown in this village's farming land:-

- Wheat (Rabi Crop):- It is grown here as a Food crop & Cash crop.
- Cotton (Kharif Crop):- It is grown here as a Cash crop.
- Mustard (Rabi Crop):- It is grown here as a Cash crop.
- Rice (Kharif Crop):- It is grown here as a Food crop & Cash crop.
- Kinnow (Rabi Crop):- It is grown here as a Horticulture crop.
- Berseem (Rabi Crop):- It is grown here as a Fodder crop.
- Jowar (Kharif Crop):- It is grown here as a Fodder crop.
