= Weir, Rajasthan =

Weir
- Town
- Location in Rajasthan, India Weir (India)
- Coordinates: 27.02°N 77.17°E
- Country: India
- State: Rajasthan
- District: Bharatpur
- Founder: Badan Singh
- Elevation: 272 m (892 ft)

Population (2001)
  - Total: 17,331

Languages
  - Official: Hindi
- Time zone: UTC+5:30 (IST)
- PIN: 321408
- Vehicle registration: RJ-05

Weir is a town and a municipality in Bharatpur District in the Indian state of Rajasthan.

== History ==
Raja Pratap Singh of Weir, son of Brajraj Raja Shri Mahendra Badan Singh of Bharatpur was granted estate of Weir around 1739.

== Geography ==
Weir is located at 25.68°N 75.73°E. It has an average elevation of 272 metres (1092 feet).

== Demographics ==
As of the Indian census, Weir had a population of 17,331. Males constituted 53% of the population and females 47%. Weir had an average literacy rate of 57%, lower than the national average of 59.5%. Male literacy was 71% and female literacy was 41%. In Weir, 18% of the population was under six years of age.

== Tourist attractions ==
1. Baba Manohar Das Temple
2. Kila Weir
3. White Palace
4. NoLakha Bagh
5. Sita Ka Kund
6. Pili Pokhar (Lakhanpur)
7. Sidh Ashram (Lakhanpur)
8. The Dev Baba temple in Nagla Jahaz, Weir
9. Flower park (world's oldest flower park)
10. Fruit garden (sells guava, papaya, lemon, orange, aabla, ber etc.)
11. Old Sitaramji Temple (near Pratap River)
12. Baldau ji Temple (main market)
13. Temple of Garhwale Hanuman ji (Dr.Rangheya Raghav Colony)
14. Damodar ji Temple / Bhagwan Parshuram Mandir / Brahmin Samaj Dharmashala
15. Baladuary Mandir (Nolakha Bag)
16. Dr. Rangeya Raghava Colony
17. Shri Balla Wale Hunumanji
18. Nagaich Mandir
19. Lakshkar ka ghar (bangle makers)

== Colleges ==
1. Chetram Ward College
2. Ranghey Raghav Mahila Mahavidhalay, Bharatpur Gate, Weir
3. Punjab Technical University
4. Baba Manohar Das College, Halena Road
5. M.G. College, Weir
6. S.N. College, Weir
7. Utkarsh College, Weir

== Schools ==
1. Adarsh Vidya Mandir, Wei
2. Princess Public School, Bayana Gate
3. Shanti Vidya Mandir
4. Saraswati Senior Secondary School
5. Modern Public Senior Secondary School
6. Bal Vikas Vidhya Mandir
7. Govt Senior Secondary School, Weir
8. Govt Senior Secondary Girls School, Weir
9. Govt Primary School, Foolwri, Weir
10. Govt Primary School, Kila, Weir
11. Govt Girls Primary School, Kila, Weir
12. Gurukul Public School, Weir
13. Shri Ganesh Senior Secondary School, Weir
14. Creative Public School
15. Somendra Vidya Mandir
16. Arise Public School, Bayana Gate
