= Azeem Sarwar (broadcaster) =

Pakistani broadcaster (1943–2021)

- Born: 1 January 1943
- Died: 12 September 2021 (aged 78)
- Resting place: Gulshan-e-Iqbal, Karachi
- Occupations: Broadcaster, sports producer and columnist
- Years active: 1958 – 2002
- Career
- Show: Aalami Sports Round-Up
- Station: Radio Pakistan
- Show: Subh-e-Pakistan

Azeem Sarwar was a Pakistani broadcaster, sports producer, columnist, and dramatist. He was the creator of Radio Pakistan's programs like Subh-e-Pakistan, Jaidi Ke Mehman, and Aalmi Sports Roundup.

== Early life ==
Sarwar was born in Quetta, British India, in 1943. His family was originally from Sialkot. When he was 4, he lost his father who was an army contractor.

== Career ==
Sarwar was only 16 years old when he joined Radio Pakistan, Quetta, as an announcer on 4 April 1958. During his career spanning over 44 years, he conceived, anchored, and produced several radio shows such as Aalami Sports Round-Up, Awaz Khazana, Rang Hi Rang Jaidi Ke Sung, Jaidi Ke Mehman, and Subh-e-Pakistan. In 1974, he produced a live broadcast of the second Islamic Summit Conference held in Lahore. He is also credited to have scouted and trained several youngsters who later became success stories in the media industry.

As a sports journalist, Sarwar covered Pakistan Cricket Team's tour to England (1987), Australia (1988–89), and South Africa (1998). He also participated as an Urdu commentator in Men's Hockey World Cup (1986) in England, Cricket World Cup in Australia, and FIFA World Cup (1990) in Italy.

As a dramatist, he wrote and performed several plays for Radio Pakistan and Pakistan Television. One of his plays, "Khabar Azaad Hai" was named the best play of Radio Pakistan Karachi's 1969 Drama Festival. Since 1969, he had also been penning columns in the Urdu daily Jang.

At the age of 60, he took retirement from his position as Deputy Controller at Radio Pakistan on 2 August 2002. In the later years of his life, he managed to record Abul A'la Maududi's Quranic commentary Tafhim-ul-Quran and some other Islamic books in his voice.

== Death ==
Sarwar died on 12 September 2021 in Karachi at the age of 79.
