= Sarwar, Rajasthan =

Sarwar
- Town
- Location in Rajasthan, India Sarwar (India)
- Coordinates: 26.07°N 75.0°E
- Country: India
- State: Rajasthan
- District: Ajmer
- Elevation: 337 m (1,106 ft)

Population (2011)
  - Total: 20,372

Languages
  - Official: Hindi
- Time zone: UTC+5:30 (IST)

Sarwar is a city and a sub division in Ajmer district in the Indian state of Rajasthan. Additionally, it is a Nagar Palika and Panchayat samiti. It is part of the Kekri Assembly and Ajmer Lok Sabha constituencies

== Geography ==
Sarwar is located at 26.07°N 75.0°E. It has an average elevation of 337 metres (1105 feet). It is located on the banks of the river "Dai", which is a tributary of the river Banas.

== Demographics ==
As of 2011 India census, Sarwar had a population of 20,372. Males constitute 51.38% of the population and females 48.61%. Sarwar has an average literacy rate of 64.65%, lower than the national average of 74.04%: male literacy is 78.43%, and female literacy is 50.07%. In Sarwar, 16.24% of the population is under 6 years of age. Sarwar is 16 km from town kekri and 64 km from District Ajmer.

== Tourism ==
Sarwar is known for the Sarwar Sharif Dargah, the final resting place of Khwaja Fakhruddin Chishti.
