= Chakeri Sawai Madhopur =

Chakeri
- Village
- Location in Rajasthan, India Chakeri (India)
- Coordinates: 26.1456641°N 76.4505173°E
- Country: India
- State: Rajasthan
- District: Sawai Madhopur

Government
  - Sarpanch: Rama Devi Meena
  - Vice Serpanch: Seema Devi

Population (2011)
  - Total: 3,441

Languages
  - Official: Hindi
- Time zone: UTC+5:30 (IST)
- pin code: 322034
- ISO 3166 code: RJ-IN
- Vehicle registration: RJ 25

Chakeri is a small village in the Sawai Madhopur district of Rajasthan, India, located approximately 26 kilometers from the district headquarter of Sawai Madhopur.

== Location ==
Chakeri located 20 kilometers from Sawai Madhopur district headquarter and well connected by road and train. Chakeri has a railway station known as Makholi, that is separate village so it made confused the people many times. Chakeri so called Makholi railway station located at Delhi-Mumbai railway track. there many trains are available from here to reach Sawai Madhopur or Gangapur city, generally they are local trains. Transport is also available by Jeep and bus available in fixed slot of time, such as early morning, afternoon and evening. Trains are available in Mokholi Chakari Station.

== Demographics ==
The population data according national population register

Serial number	Element	Number	Male	Female
1	Total Population	3,441	1,733	1,708
2	SC Population	623	311	312
3	ST Population	2,005	1,025	980
4	Total Household	695	-	-
5	Literate	1,703	1,124	579
6	illiterate	1,738	609	1,129

== Activities ==
=== Sports ===
1. Ranthambhore cricket tournament held annually at the end of the year, this was continued from approximately twenty to twenty-five year highly cooperated by the villagers especially youths. Participant teams belong to the surrounding villages and many other remote villages that are linked by family relationship, friendship and on the basis of invitation. This one organized by the spirit of mutual brotherhood.
2. Wrestling tournament an annual event in the village, the entire eastern Rajasthan wrestler come to participate in it with them and see people coming together for people who have made a great brotherhood atmosphere.
3. Rural sports event also was made into a village, in which many sports (kabaddi, volleyball, football, kho-kho etc.) to participate in several villages participated. Since then they have been held on closed. To lead them back to rural villagers and initiatives are required.

=== Kanhaiya Geet ===
Kanhaiya geet provide a distinct identity to Chakeri in the cultural map of Rajasthan, without any discrimination people gathered and sing together. They are held in the village on many times, many village are participated and introduce the vibrancy of its culture, and strengthen the relationship between the villages. The interest of the people may be assumed by the fact that a separate stadium was built for this purpose. Which allows viewers to see the casual view, which have plain, light, water, shadow, vehicle parking, view for female audiences are wonderful facility. This was Constructed under the MPLADS of Union Minister Namo Narain Meena near the temple. The Reference of song are religious or mythological events, stories and beliefs. some times they refer to the contemporary issues and traditions. the youngster's interest are highly increase inside them. These song were spread by media kamsahay meena, devilal meena, ramkaran meena, they give significant contribution for it. The Mandli of Chakeri's artist play an event in Jawahar Kala Kendra in Jaipur of Kanhaiya geet, that was an honored occasion on their achievements. the event of Kanhaiya geet called 'dangal' recognised as a political stage also.

=== Religious activities ===
1. Feri And Hari Kirtan is a regular early morning programs of villagers.
2. Hymns(भजन ) are held regularly in the village, they are in the courtyard of the temple of Hanuman In the evening. The special thing is that these kids to participate. By evening the whole village children Hanuman temple incense or lighting a lamp to come in and go after hymn. It shows the children in the village to be learned from childhood that a good customs.
3. Krishna Janmashtami birthday every year are held in the village temples. People are fast. The temples are in the nightly prayers and devotional. And they shall vow offerings Butter open. Tableau of Krishna are made in temples. Sometimes pitcher for the break, children's programs are kept.
4. Ganesh Chaturthi forward an especial atmosphere in the village. Trinetra Ganesh Temple, located in the Ranthambore fort. People from different parts of eastern Rajasthan come for darshan, to serve pedestrians organise camp(भंडारे) in the village, their night rest, drinking water, food and tea and snacks are arranged in collaboration with the villagers. Ganesh Chaturthi day before villagers through the village to retrieve all of the tableau, which are transported Ranthambore and is immersed in ponds are located there. Villagers sing and dance with the tableau foot travel.
5. Holika Dahan village every year in Holy place called Holai Blaya, located at the heart of the village. Several days before Holly Danda buried by the punch-Patel. Then villagers gathered there on the content of combustion and then the day of Holi auspicious time according to the combustion is done. People in the fire earrings eat wheat, are supposed to eat them is not the problem of pain in the gums. There are many people gathered at the Night of the gathered young and play kabaddi. This is the second day of Dhulndi. That day the whole village atmosphere became colourful.
6. Govardhan Puja program which they collectively celebrate. muck is gathered by Women of the village early in the morning at the temple. at late evening Govardhan built and each house has a man comes to worship. Others also gathered there, and run burst.

== Infrastructure ==
Many functions have been provided by the village panchayat, as well as good behavior from politicians, MLAs and MPs village so there are too many things, here we can see about them.

=== Education ===
There was considerable awareness through education in the village, especially in youth class. The following are available educational institutions -

1. Government Senior Secondary School before the integration of primary school provide higher secondary education

https://govtsrsecschoolchakeri.business.site

Kasturba Gandhi Girls School provide residential facility for the girls of class 6th to 12th

1. Nanesh Shikshan Sansthan is a private upper primary school
2. Sunlight Education Academy is a private upper primary school

=== Neighboring Villages ===
chakeri's neighboring village, connectivity and relationship description are given below

1. Kundera 3 km away, located in the south-east. connected by road but not say well because smoothness is distorted by the trolly of sand. this is the closest town to Chakeri provide the market requirements of the villager, here on Wednesday that it takes Hatbajhar (Htvada), especially is the center of attraction for women of the village. SO villager Need good connectivity.
2. Shyampura 3 km away located in the east, have good road connectivity. The Chakeri has enjoyed clan-brother relationship with the Shyampura on the behalf of a clan which name is Dungarjal.
3. Badolas 5 km away located in the North, have road connectivity .
4. Rhitha 3 km away located in the north-east, have road connectivity .
5. Khat 3 km away located in the west, have road connectivity .
6. padhana 5 km away located in the north-west, have road connectivity .
7. Ninoni 4 km away located in the north, have good road connectivity .
8. Makholi 3 km away located in the south, Required road connectivity .
9. Hingoni 5 km away located in the north-east, have road connectivity .
10. Selu 4 km away located in the south-west, Required road connectivity .

=== Government Institution ===
1. Post Office chakeri branch of the Indian post with postal code 322034 cover the chakeri and nearby region like Rahitha, Badolas or Ninoni.
2. AAyurvedic Health Center
3. Primary Health Center or Dispensry
4. Veterinary Hospital
