= Khirni =

Village in Rajasthan, India

Coordinates: 26°15′N 76°20′E

Khirni is a gram panchayat in the Sawai Madhopur district of Rajasthan, India. It is located 32 km from the Sawai Madhopur town. It lies 6 km from the 4-lane Kota-Agra highway at Bhadoti.

Agriculture is the main occupation in Khirni. The town lies near the Banas river, and canals provide irrigation.

There are two Government senior secondary schools, one each for boys and girls. Other schools are:

- Secondary National public school
- Govt.Upper Primary school Dhani Khirni
- Aadarsh Vidya Mandir
- Senior Secondary Saraswati Vidya Mandir
- Suman public school
- Employment English medium school
- Shaeen Public School
- Govt. Girls Senior Secondary School
- Madarsa Zia-ul-Ulum (Arabic and Urdu).

There are 10 temples and 6 mosques. There is a primary health center as well.
