= Sawai Madhopur Municipal Council =

Type
- Type: Municipal Council of Sawai Madhopur
- Term limits: 5 years

Leadership
- Chairman: Mewa Chaudhary
- Vice Chairman: Maya Goyal
- Executive Officer: Dilip Puniya

Structure
- Seats: 60
- Political groups: Government (33): BJP (33); Opposition (27): INC (18); IND (9)

Elections
- Voting system: First-past-the-post
- Last election: 9 September 2026
- Next election: 2031

Sawai Madhopur Municipal Council, also known as Sawai Madhopur Nagar Parishad, is the municipal council of Sawai Madhopur in Rajasthan, India. The council is divided into 60 wards.

== History ==
The municipal administration of Sawai Madhopur was established in 1945 and initially had 30 wards. A study published in 2010 refers to the chairman of the Sawai Madhopur Municipal Committee in 1961. The Rajasthan Gazette referred to the municipal limits of Sawai Madhopur Municipality in 1965. In 1976, the Election Commission of India listed the Sawai Madhopur Municipal Board as part of the Sawai Madhopur Assembly constituency.

According to a historical account published by Dainik Bhaskar, the municipality and the Alanpur Notified Area were merged in the 1980s, after which Sawai Madhopur became a municipal council. The Government of Rajasthan's Finance Accounts for 2010–11 listed Sawai Madhopur as a municipal council. By 2026, the municipal council had 60 wards.
