= Sanghiji =

Building in India

Shri Digamber Jain Atishya Kshetra Mandir, Sanghiji
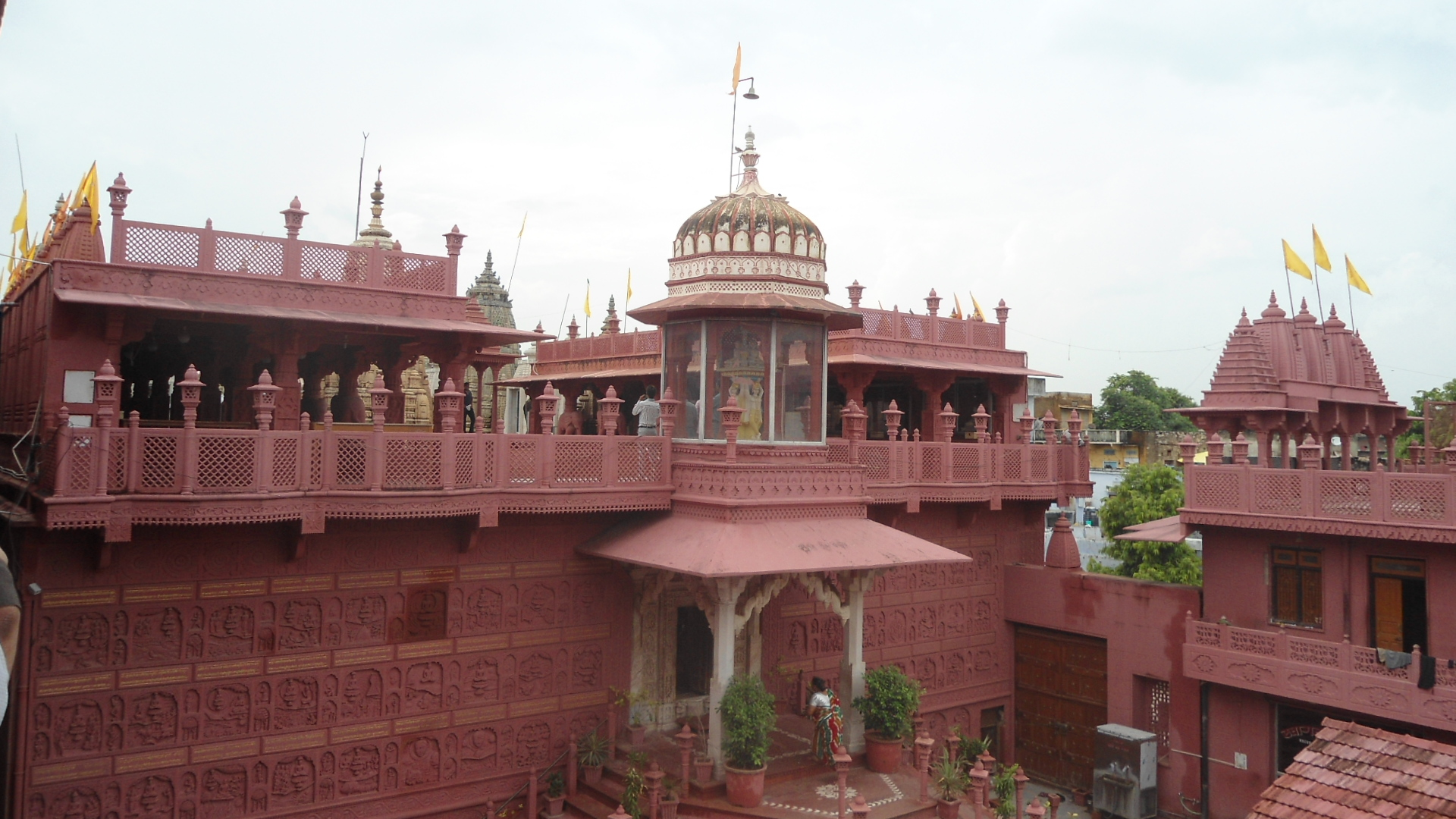
- Sanganer Temple

- Sanghiji

Religion
- Affiliation: Jainism
- Sect: Digambar
- Deity: Rishabhanatha
- Governing body: Management committee Shri Digamber Jain Atishaya Kshetra Mandir

Location
- Location: Sanganer, Jaipur, Rajasthan
- Coordinates: 26°48′54″N 75°47′10″E

Architecture
- Style: Nagara architecture, Māru-Gurjara architecture
- Temple: 1

Website
- sanghijimandir.in

Shri Digamber Jain Atishya Kshetra Mandir, Sanghiji is an ancient Jain Temple in Sanganer, Rajasthan made of red stone. The ancient Shri Digamber Jain temple of Sanganer is 16 km from Jaipur.

== History ==
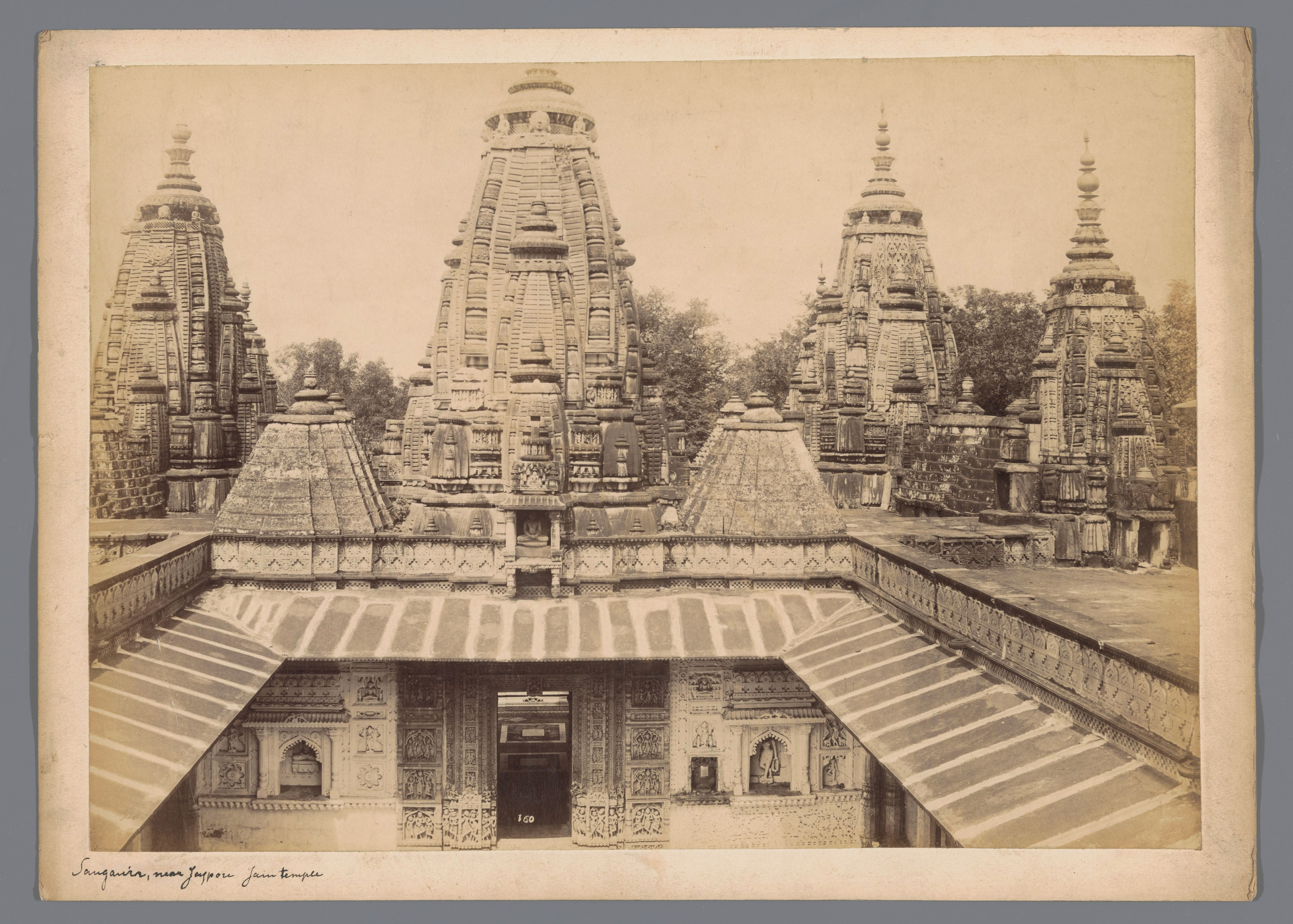
Sanghiji temple in 1850

This temple is a major Jain pilgrimage center. The idol of the principal deity of this temple, Lord Rishabhanatha (Adinatha), the first Tirthankara, is supposed to be 4000 years old. The last phase of this temple was completed in the 10th century A.D., according to the inscription of V.S. 1011 in one of the Toranas.

== About temple ==
In the underground portion, there is located an ancient small temple guarded by the yaksha, nature spirits. The sacred temple has seven underground floors which are kept closed due to old religious beliefs and visitors are not allowed to see them. It is said that only a Balyati ascetic Digambara saint can enter it and can bring out the idols of this underground temple for a limited period, which is declared and decided previously.

The temple also has a dharamshala equipped with all modern facilities, including bhojanalaya (a restaurant).

== Architecture ==
The Jaina temple follows Nagara architecture. The temple features a highly decorated arched entrance. The temple has a double storey gateway with first storey surmounted by an Nagara style arched Shikhara.

The temple features a sky-high shikharas and the inner sanctum is a stone shrine with eight sky-high shikharas (pinnacles). Sanghiji temple is considered a great specimen of Hindu and Jain architecture. The larger shrine was built using marble and sandstone in the 10th century and the smaller shrine is rich with ornate carvings of the temple; using the white marble is comparable to that of Dilwara Temples in Mount Abu.

The decorative features such as flying arches, bracket figures, carved pillars, and lotus ceilings are a feature of Māru-Gurjara architecture.

== Idols ==
The inner temple has three pinnacles; in the centre is an idol of Parshwanath with seven serpent hoods. All around it is carvings of lotuses, creepers and elephants pouring water from pitchers held in their trunks. The main idol is that of Adinath, installed in the shrine behind this.

In 1999, Muni Sudhasagar visited the temple and brought thirty-nine valuable Jain idols. The idols were brought from the fourth underground floor and many yakshas (in the form of snakes) were encountered, protecting the treasure.

== Gallery ==
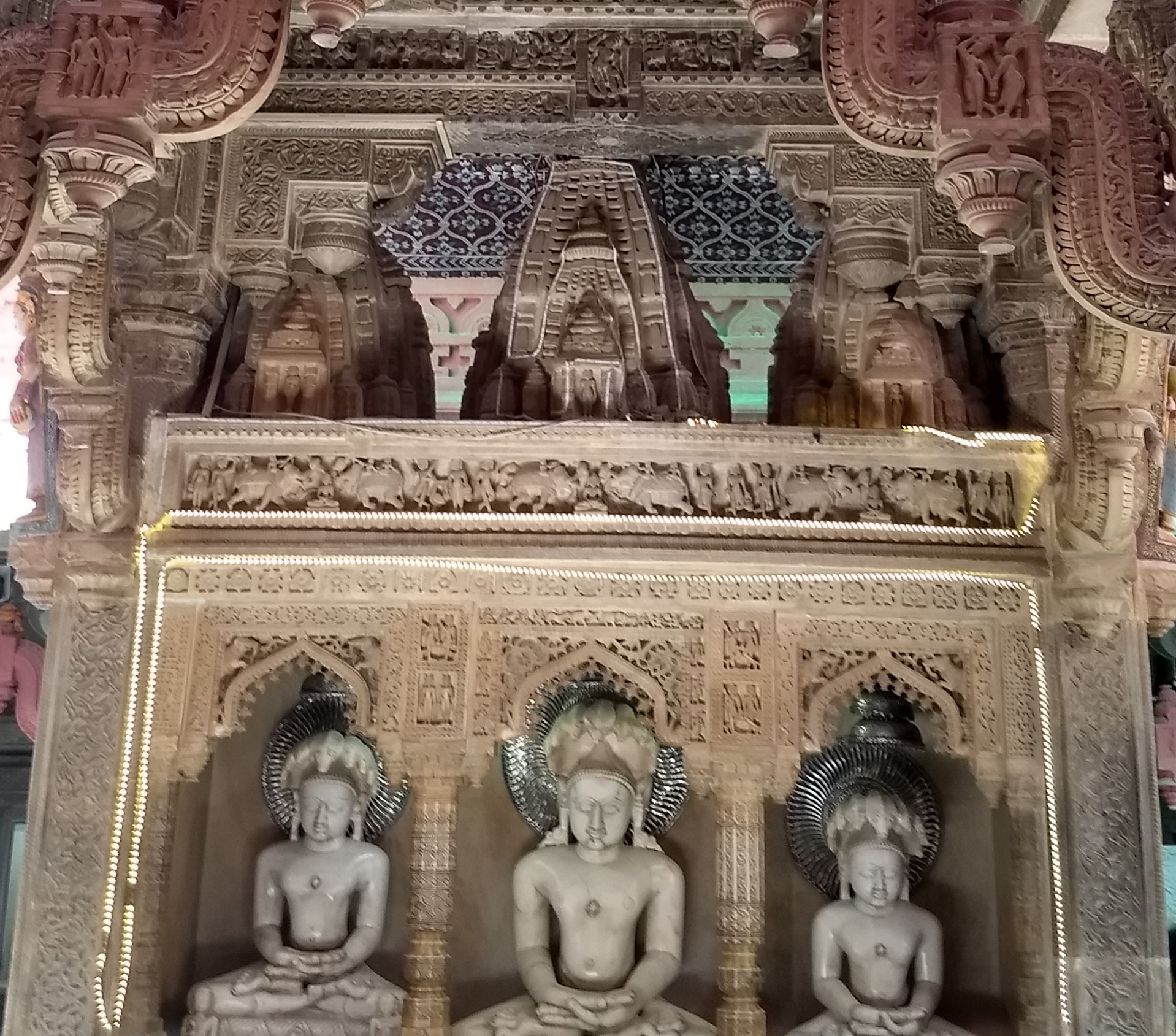
Front Vedi

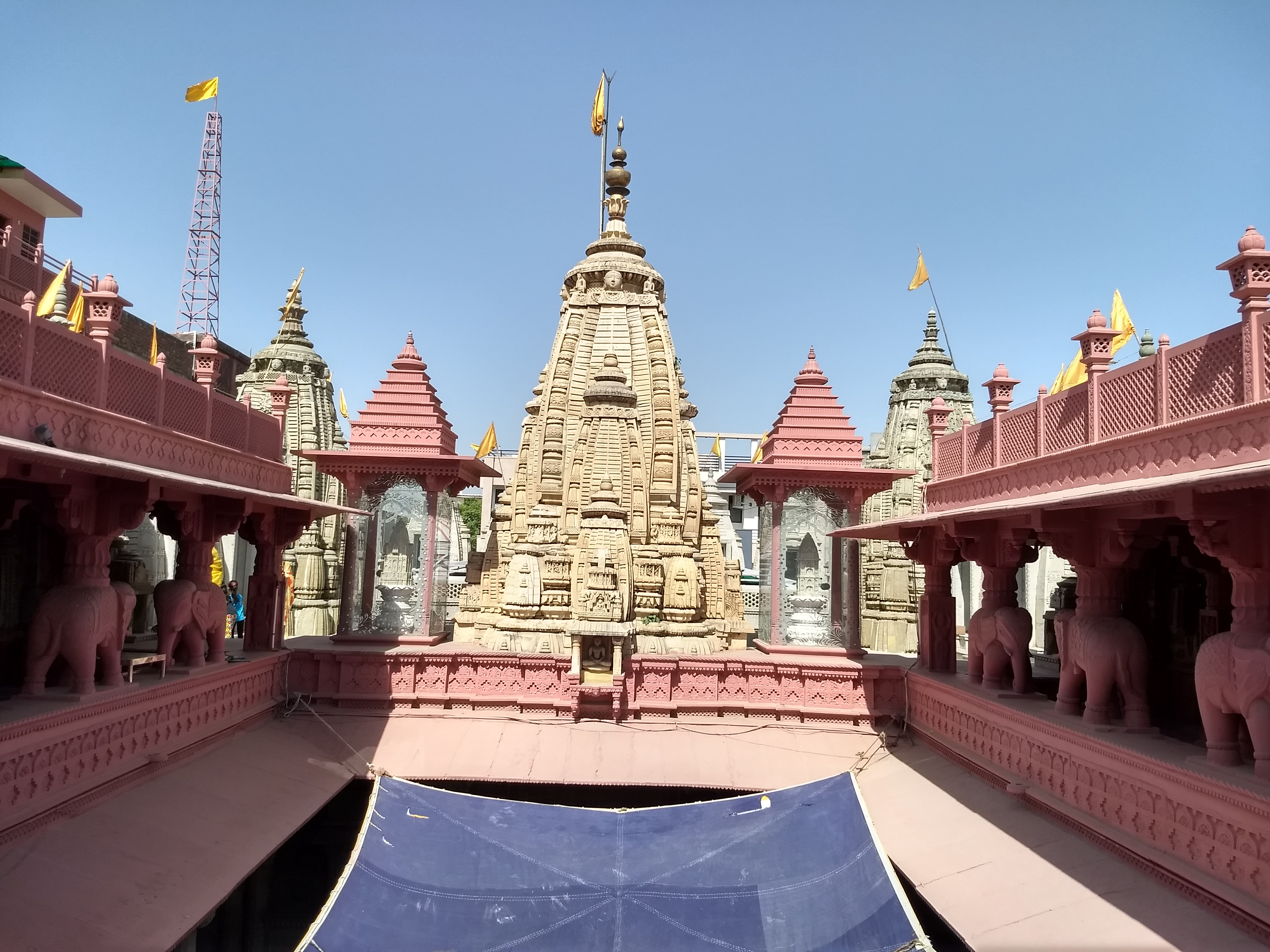
Shikhar

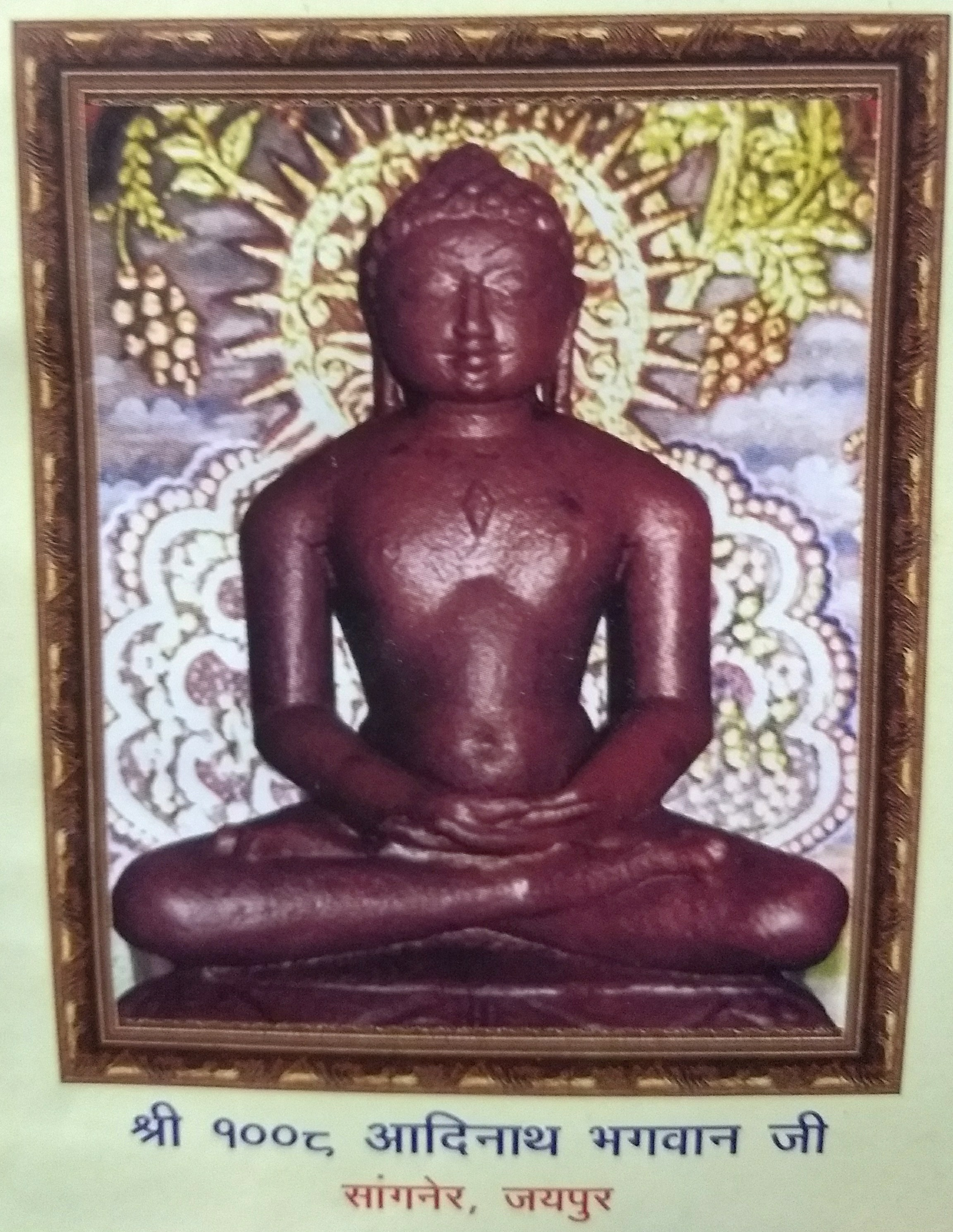
Rishabhanatha idol

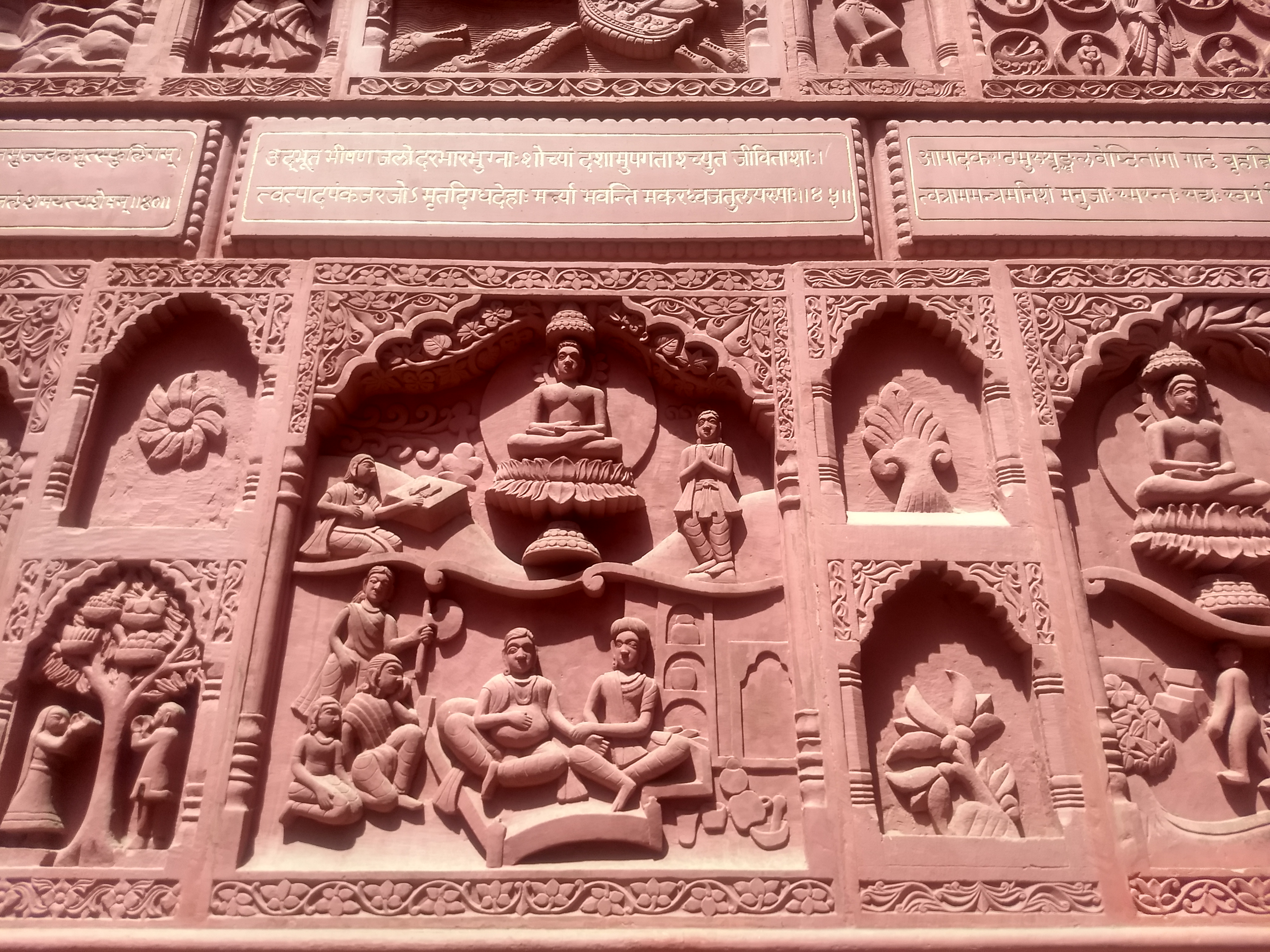
Murals on the wall

== See also ==
- Padampura
- Chamatkarji
