= Chamatkarji =

Jain temple in Rajasthan, India

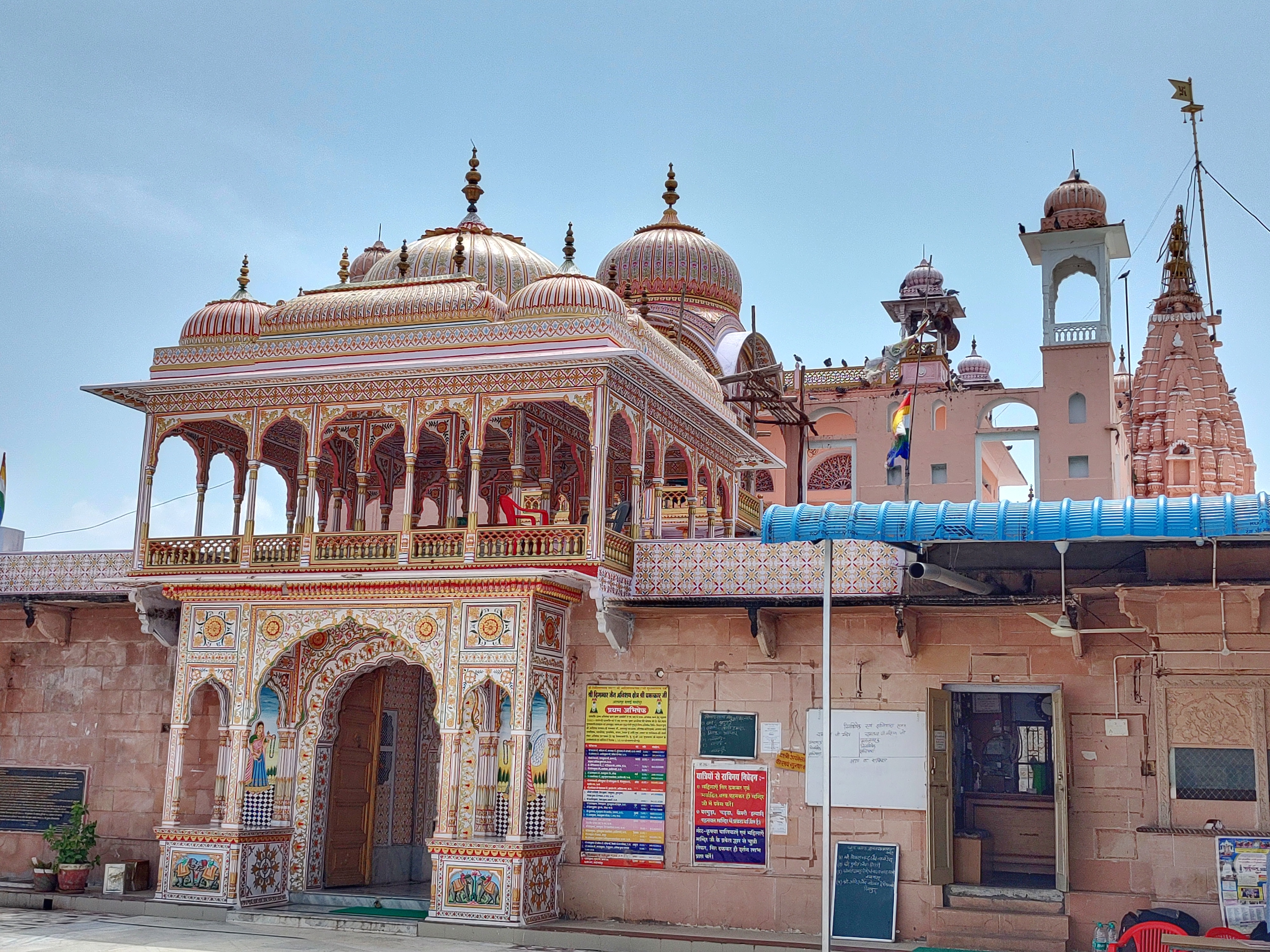

- Location within Rajasthan

Religion
- Affiliation: Jainism
- Sect: Digambara
- Deity: Rishabhanatha
- Festival: Mahavir Janma Kalyanak
- Governing body: Shri Digambar Jain Atishaya Kshetra Chamatkarji Prabandha Karini Samiti

Location
- Location: Sawai Madhopur, Rajasthan
- Coordinates: 26°00′02″N 76°21′50″E

Architecture
- Temple: 8

Chamatkarji is an important Jain temple located near Ranthambore Fort in the city of Sawai Madhopur in Rajasthan.

== History ==
Chamatkarji dates back to the early medieval period. The temple is dedicated to Rishabhanatha, the first Tirthankara of Jainism. The historic monument is also known archaeologically as the Alanpur Jain temple. The Archaeological Survey of India lists the Jain temple at Alanpur among the protected monuments of Rajasthan.

The name Chamatkarji is associated with the religious belief that the principal image possesses miraculous powers, chamatkar meaning "miracle".

Later religious traditions concerning the site developed around an image of Adinatha discovered near the temple. These accounts form part of the devotional tradition of Chamatkarji rather than the archaeological history of the early medieval monument. The temple remains an important component of the architectural heritage of Alanpur and Sawai Madhopur. It is included in the heritage-building inventory prepared by the Indian National Trust for Art and Cultural Heritage.

The archaeological significance of the site rests instead on the historic temple at Alanpur, which is classified by the ASI among Rajasthan's protected monuments and is described as an early-medieval Jain temple.

== Architecture ==
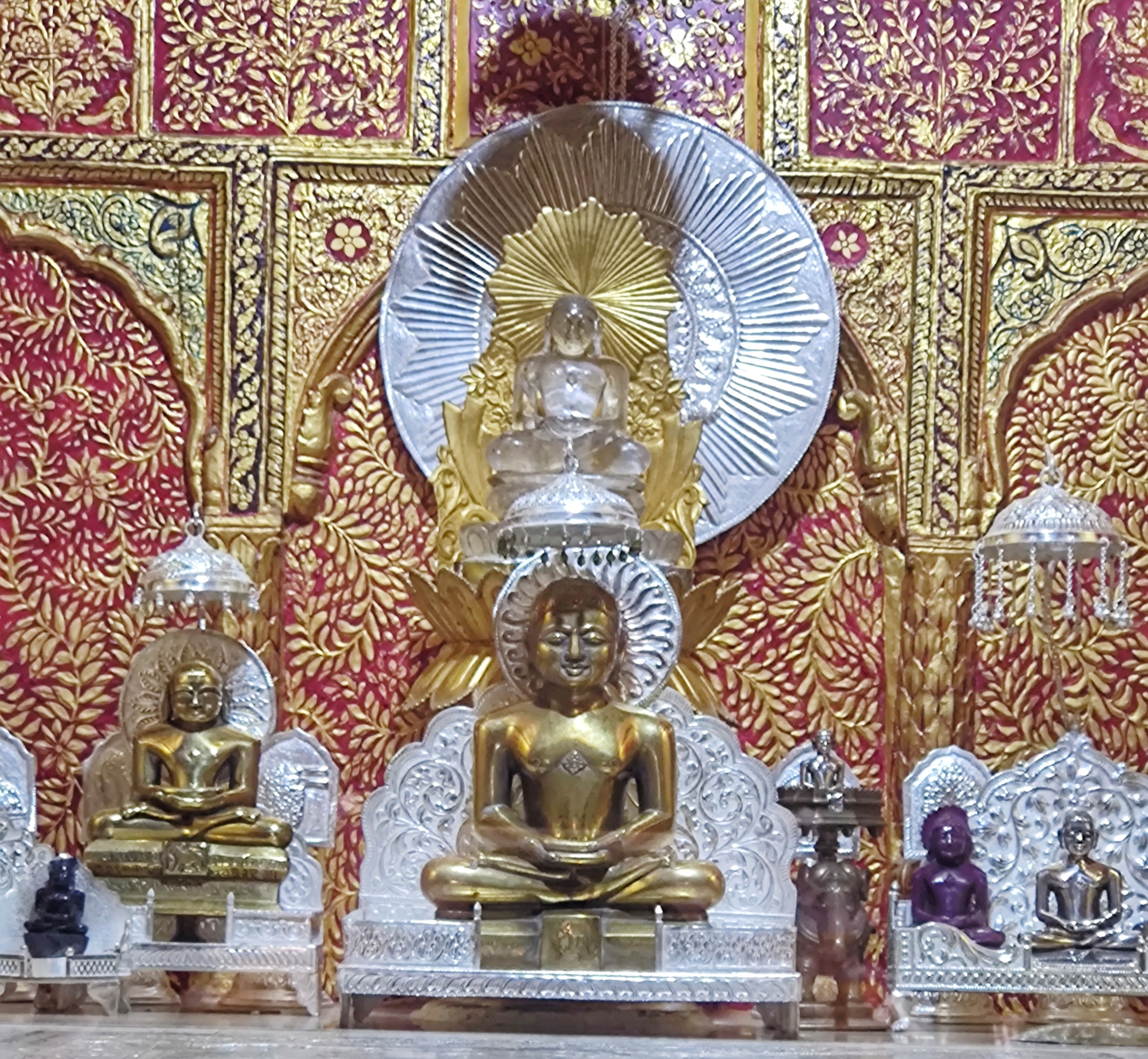
Main vedi

The temple complex is enclosed within a high parapet wall canopied by chhatris all round. The main shrine is structure situated in the centre of the complex. The complex is entered from the west. The principal shrine occupies the centre of a courtyard and is itself enclosed by a high wall, with an entrance from the north. The garbhagriha faces east and is pancharatha in plan, with five projections articulating its exterior. A circumambulatory passage surrounds the sanctuary. The ceiling of the temple is a domical structure with carvings of an inverted lotus. The temple entrance has foliated arch supported by pillars.

The sanctuary is surmounted by a curvilinear shikhara. The combination of the pancharatha sanctuary and curvilinear tower represents the principal architectural form of the historic shrine. The mulnayak of the temple is a white color idol of Rishabhanatha placed inside the garbhagriha of the temple. The temple features a pancharatha on the sikhara.

The pancharatha plan divides the exterior of the sanctum into five principal projections and recesses. This articulation is characteristic of the Nagara architectural vocabulary of northern and western India and distinguishes the Alanpur shrine from temple plans based on a simple square exterior. The circumambulatory passage is an integral part of the shrine's original architectural conception. Worshippers could therefore circumambulate the sanctum while remaining within the enclosed temple structure, a feature of considerable importance in Jain temple planning.

Small cells and later structures have been constructed around the historic central shrine, giving the present complex a considerably larger form than the original monument.

The combination of a curvilinear shikhara, pancharatha sanctum and circumambulatory passage places the monument within the broader North Indian Nagara tradition while retaining features adapted to Jain ritual use.

The surviving architectural scheme is therefore more substantial than the small modern descriptions of Chamatkarji suggest: the monument consists of a central sāndhāra shrine, an enclosing courtyard and perimeter cells, with the principal sanctuary occupying the centre of the complex.

== Principal image ==
The principal image (mūlanāyaka) is a white image of Rishabhanatha installed in the garbhagriha.

The dedication to Rishabhanatha distinguishes Chamatkarji from several other major Jain pilgrimage centres in Rajasthan whose principal images are associated with other Tirthankaras. Rishabhanatha, the first Tirthankara, is particularly important in Digambara Jain sacred geography.

The devotional reputation of the image is central to the identity of Chamatkarji as an Atishaya Kshetra. The term refers to a Jain sacred place associated with extraordinary or miraculous manifestations attributed to a Tirthankara image or the sacred site.

== Religious significance ==
The temple is regarded as an Atishaya Kshetra in the Digambara Jain tradition. Its popular name derives from traditions concerning miraculous events associated with the image worshipped at the site. The annual observance contributes to the temple's continuing importance as a pilgrimage centre rather than merely as a protected historic monument. The religious use of the temple has continued alongside the archaeological protection of the historic structure.

A fair is organised at Chamatkarji annually on Sharad Purnima.

== Conservation ==
The historic Jain temple at Alanpur is protected by the Archaeological Survey of India. Its identification as an early medieval monument distinguishes the protected historic shrine from later additions forming the modern Chamatkarji temple complex.The temple has also been documented as part of the architectural heritage of Sawai Madhopur by INTACH.

== Significance ==
Chamatkarji is significant both as an example of early-medieval Jain architecture in eastern Rajasthan and as a continuing Digambara pilgrimage centre. Its pancharatha sanctum, circumambulatory passage and curvilinear shikhara provide evidence for the adaptation of the Nagara architectural tradition to a Jain shrine.

Its protected status also makes the Alanpur temple an important monument for the study of Jain architectural heritage in Rajasthan. Unlike the later devotional narratives surrounding the Chamatkarji image, the architectural characteristics of the central shrine can be examined through the archaeological documentation of the ASI.

== See also ==
- Shri Mahaveer Ji temple
- Sanghiji
