= Ranthambore Fort =

Jat Fort in Sawai Madhopur division of Bharatpur

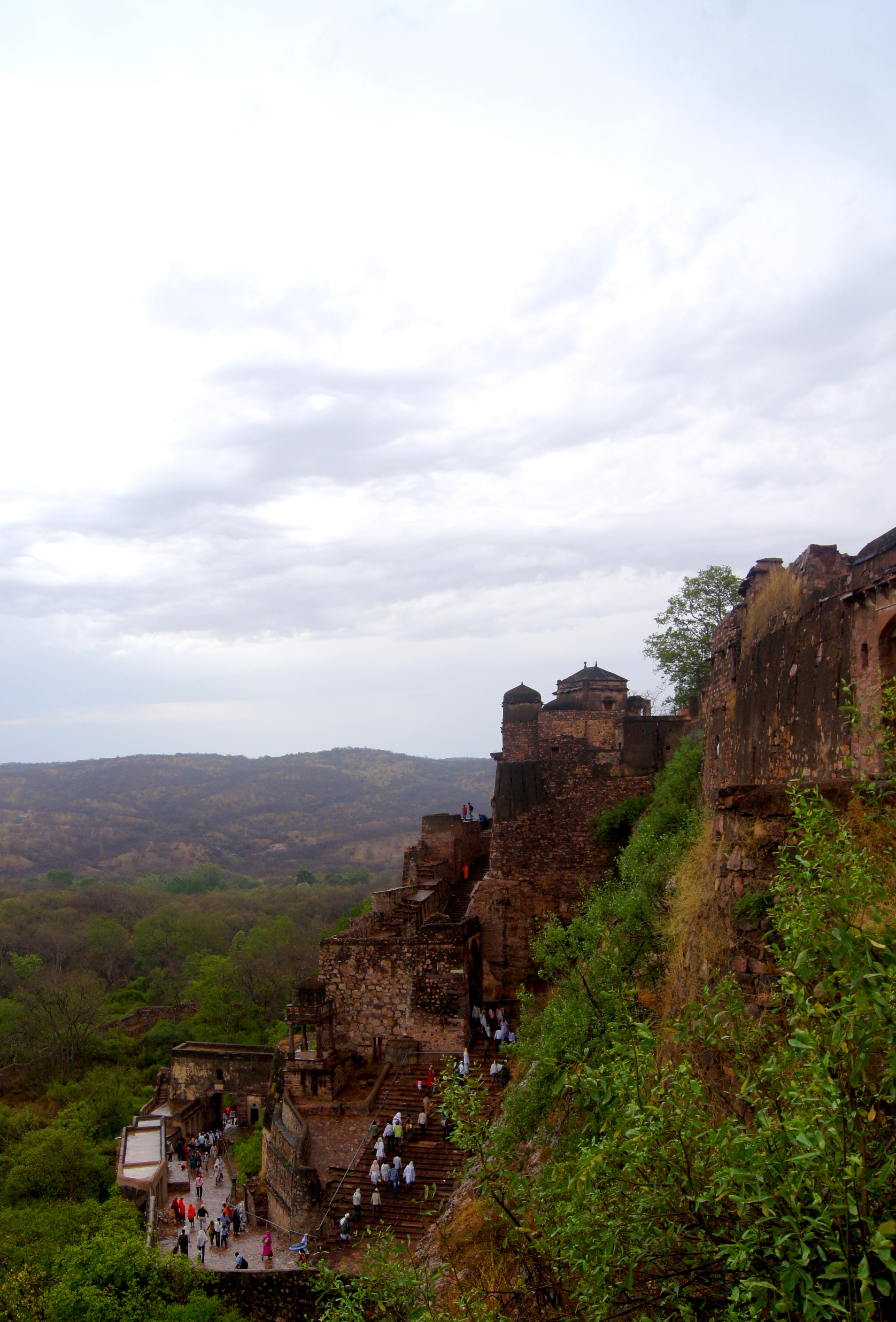
- Ranthambore Fort in Sawai Madhopur, Rajasthan, India

- Location within Rajasthan Location within India
- 26°1′13″N 76°27′18″E
- Type: Fortress
- Location: Sawai Madhopur, Rajasthan, India

History
- Built: 5th Century CE

Site notes
- Area: 102 ha (0.39 sq mi)

UNESCO World Heritage Site
- Type: Cultural
- Criteria: Cultural: (ii)(iii)
- Designated: 2013 (37th session)
- Part of: Hill Forts of Rajasthan
- Reference no.: 247
- ID: 247rev-003
- Region: Asia and the Pacific
- Buffer Zone: 372 ha (1.44 sq mi)

Ranthambore Fort lies within the Ranthambore National Park, near the city of Sawai Madhopur in Sawai Madhopur district of Rajasthan, India. The park being the former hunting grounds of the Maharajas of Jaipur until the time of India's Independence. It is a formidable fort, having been a focal point of the historical developments of Rajasthan. The fort provides a panoramic view of the surrounding Ranthambore National Park and is now a popular tourist attraction.

Rajput King Sapaldaksha of the Chauhan Dynasty laid the foundation of Ranthambore Fort during the mid-10th century. The kings who succeeded him contributed to the construction of the fort. Back in the day, Ranthambore Fort was considered impregnable owing to its strategic location and design. This became one of the many reasons why several rulers wanted to capture the fort. Subsequently, the fort was occupied by the Muslim rulers of Delhi, and later captured by several other dynasties including Hada and Mewar. The Delhi Sultanate captured it for a brief time. Later on, it came under control of Marwar and Mughals.

The fortress commanded a strategic location, 700 feet above the surrounding plain. In 2013, at the 37th session of the World Heritage Committee held in Phnom Penh, Cambodia, Ranthambore Fort, along with 5 other forts of Rajasthan, was declared a UNESCO World Heritage Site under the group Hill Forts of Rajasthan.

== History ==
=== Under Rulers ===
It was constructed by Maharaja Jayanta in fifth century A.D. The ruled over it till they were expelled by Prithviraja Chauhan in the twelfth century.

=== Under the Chauhans ===
Its earlier name was Ranastambhapura (Sanskrit: Raṇa-sthaṃba-pura, "City of the Battle Post"). It was associated with Jainism during the reign of Prithviraja I of Chahamana (Chauhan) dynasty in the 12th century. Siddhasenasuri, who lived in the 12th century has included this place in the list of holy Jain tirthas. In the Mughal period, a temple of Mallinatha was built in the fort.

After the defeat of Prithviraja III (Prithviraj Chauhan) in 1192 CE, the fort came under the control of the Muslim Ghurid ruler Muhammad of Ghor.

The Delhi Sultan Iltutmish captured Ranthambore in 1226, but the Chauhans re-captured it after his death in 1236. The armies of Sultan Nasiruddin Mahmud, led by the future Sultan Balban, unsuccessfully besieged the fortress in 1248 and 1253, but captured from Jaitrasingh Chauhan in 1259. Shakti Dev succeeded Jaitrasingh in 1283, and recaptured Ranthambore and enlarged the kingdom. Sultan Jalal ud din Firuz Khalji briefly besieged the fort in 1290-91 but was unsuccessful in capturing it. In 1299, Hammiradeva sheltered Muhammad Shah, a rebel general of Sultan Ala ud din Khalji, and refused to turn him over to the Sultan. The Sultan besieged and conquered the fort in 1301.

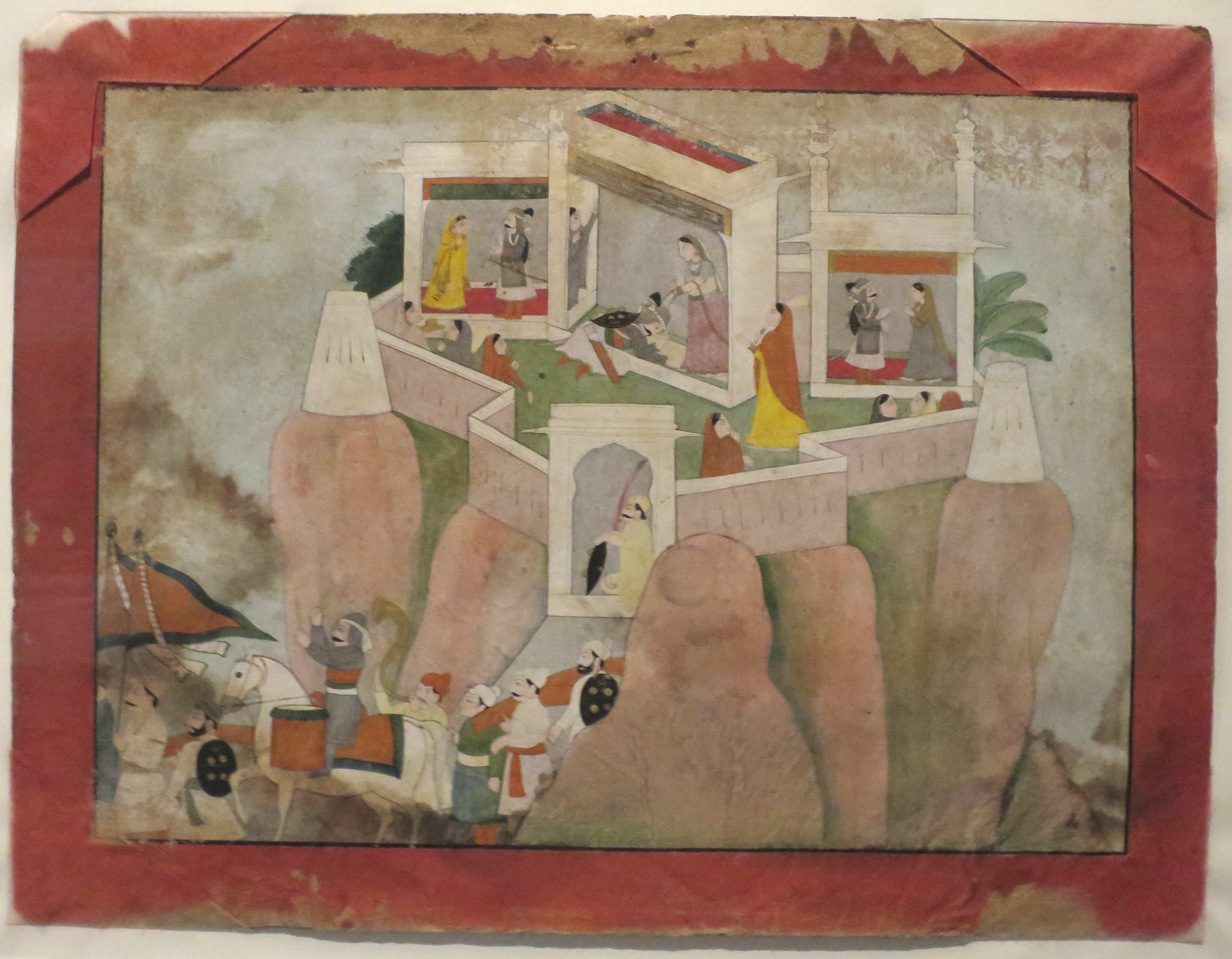
Rana Hamir leaving Ranthamore Fort for Battle, Kangra school watercolor, Tokyo National Museum

=== Under Mewar ===
The fortress was captured by various kings of Mewar. Ranthambore was under the direct rule of Rana Hamir Singh (1326–1364), Rana Kumbha (1433–1468) and Rana Sanga (1508–1528).

=== Under Hadas ===
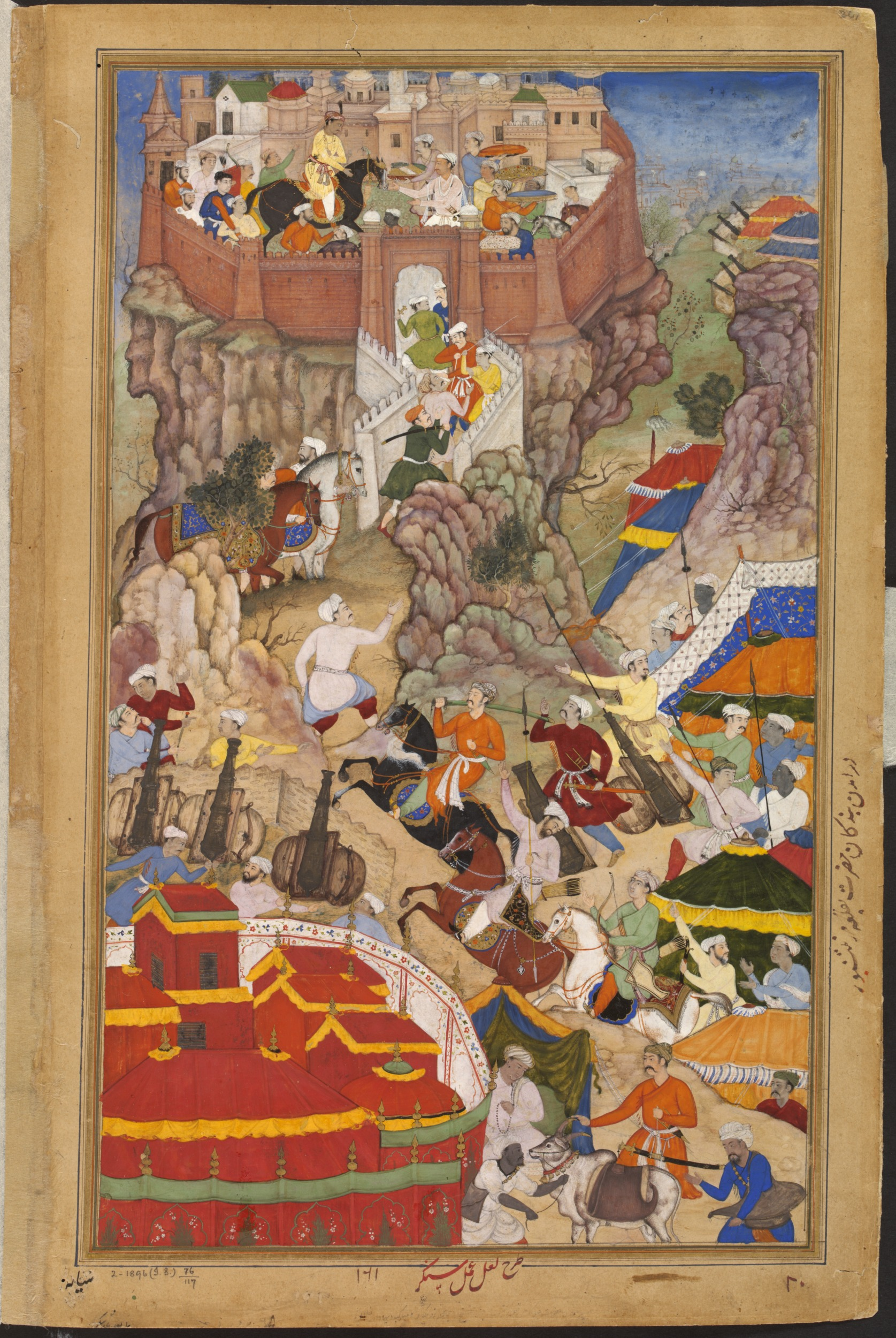
Akbar's entry into the fort of Ranthambore, 1569, Akbarnama

During Rana Udai Singh I's reign (1468–1473) the fortress passed to the Hada Rajputs of Bundi. Sultan Bahadur Shah of Gujarat briefly captured the fortress from 1532 to 1535. The Mughal Emperor Akbar captured the fortress in Siege of Ranthambore (1568) from Hadas.

=== Under Jaipur ===
The fortress passed to the Kachwaha Maharajas of Jaipur in the 17th century, and it remained part of Jaipur state until Indian Independence. The area surrounding the fortress became a hunting ground for the Maharajas of Jaipur. Jaipur state acceded to India in 1949, becoming part of the state of Rajasthan in 1950.

=== Temples ===
Inside Ranthambore fort, there are three Hindu temples dedicated to Ganesha (Trinetra Ganesha), Shiva and Ramlalaji constructed in 12th and 13th centuries from red Karauli stone. The Ganesha temple is particularly famous and attracts thousands of visitors every Wednesday. There is also a Jain temple of Lord Sumatinath (5th Jain Tirthankar) and Lord Sambhavanath.

== Nearby attractions ==
Most of the attractions listed below is not open to the public since it falls under the Project Tiger Protected Area. It can be viewed from vehicles authorized and booked for wildlife safaris only. It is also accessible to people descended from the villagers that were relocated outside the park.

Water gateways

1. Kachida Valley
2. Surwal Lake
3. Sitla Mata

Picnic sports

1. Malik Talao

Wild life

1. Bakula
2. Lakarda And Anantpura
3. Rajbagh Talao
4. Ranthambore National Park

Historical places

1. Jogi Mahal
2. Padam Talao
3. Raj Bagh Ruins
4. Ranthambhore Fort
5. Ranthambhore School Of Art
6. Ganesha temple
7. Jain Temple

== Gallery ==
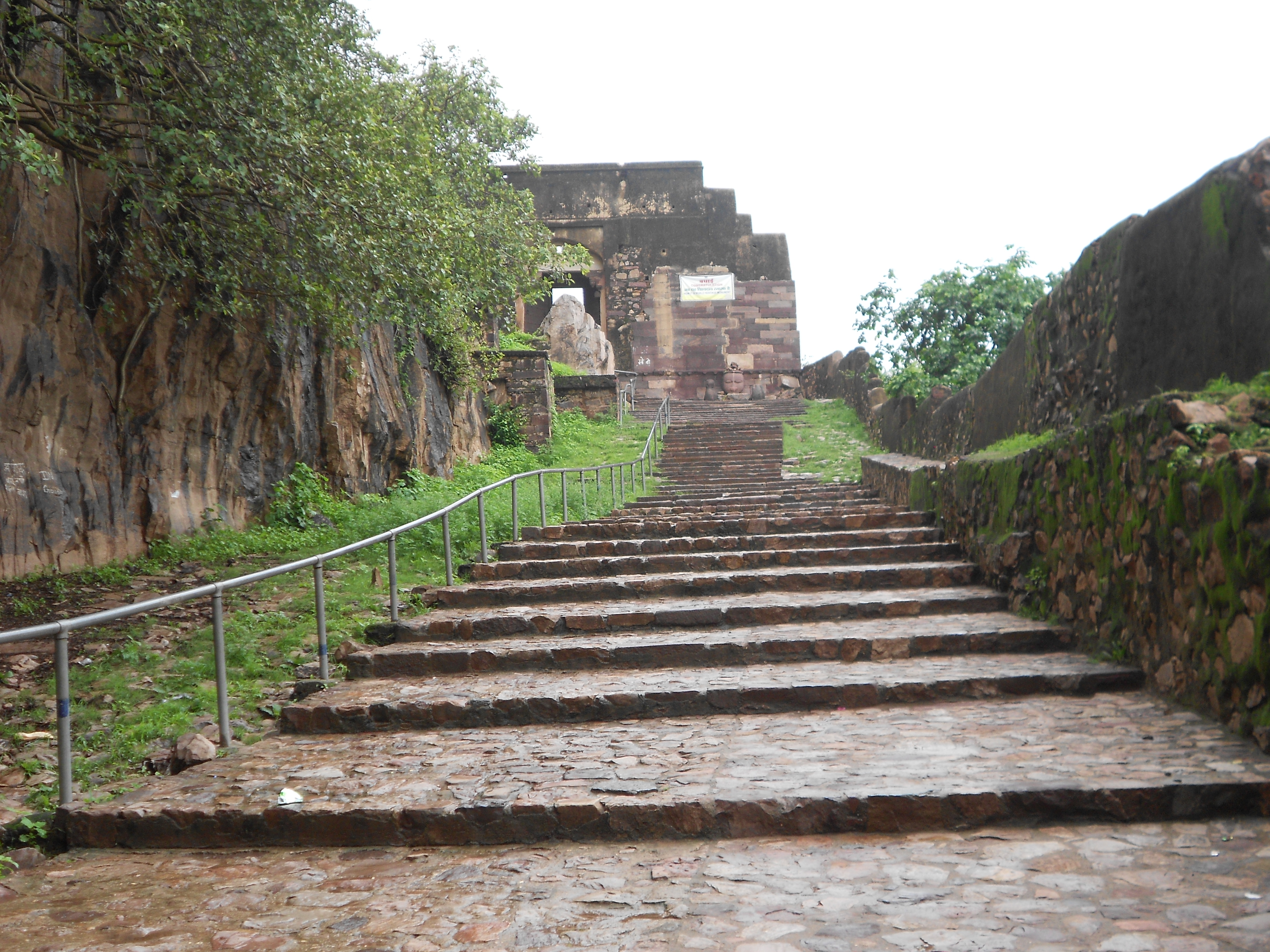
The way inside the fort

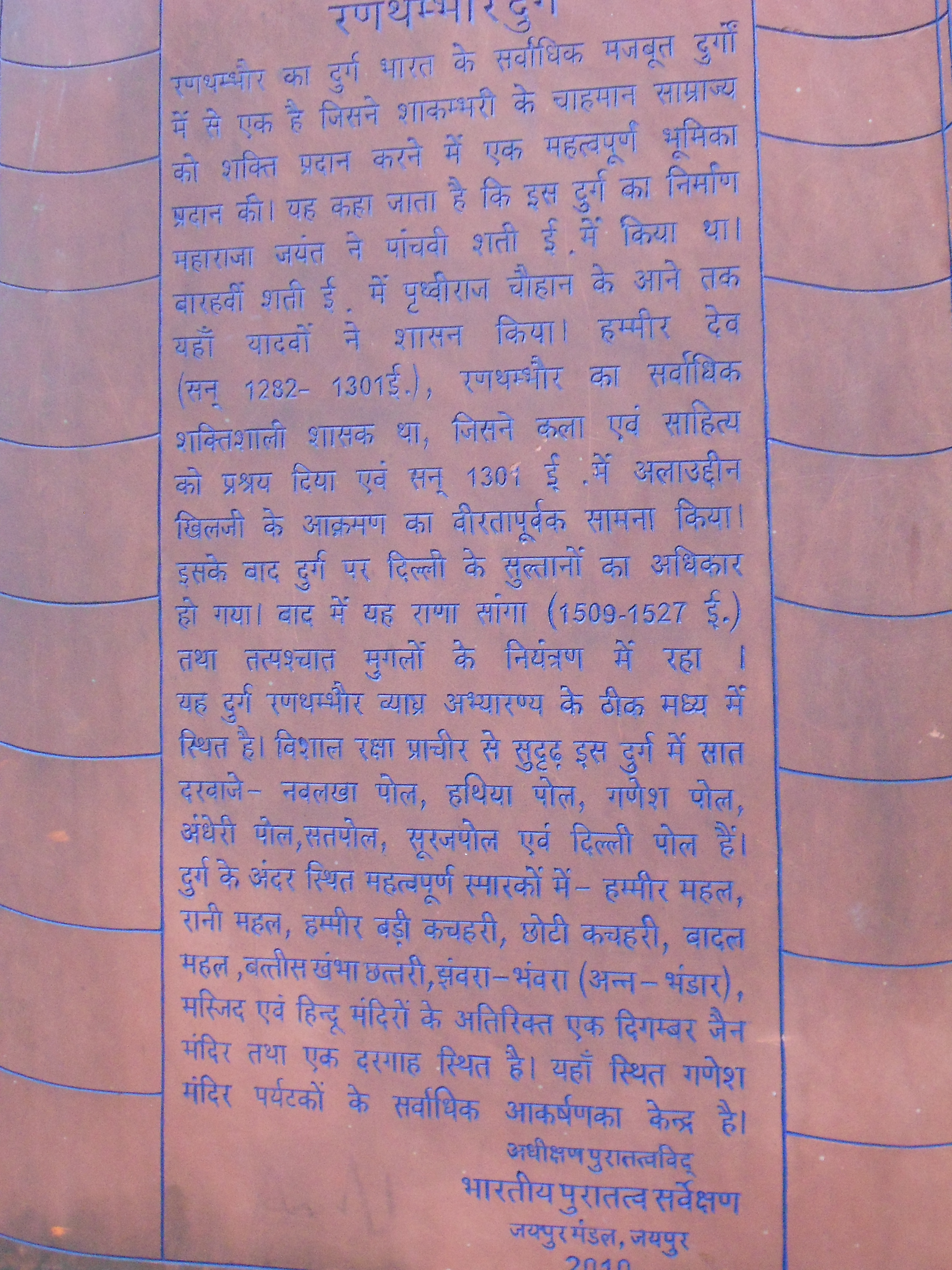
History of Ranthambore Fort written on the wall

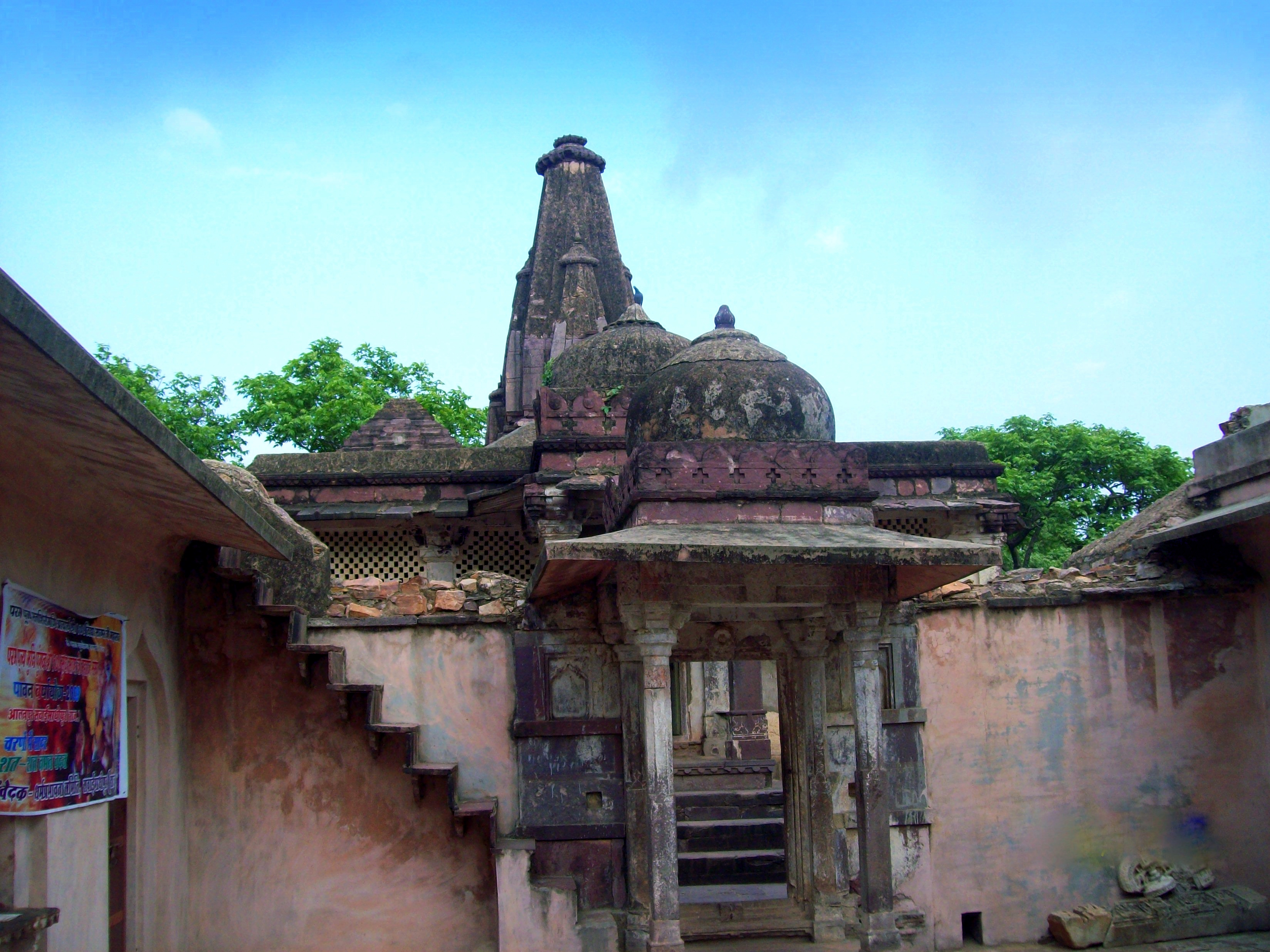
Jain temple at Ranthambore Fort

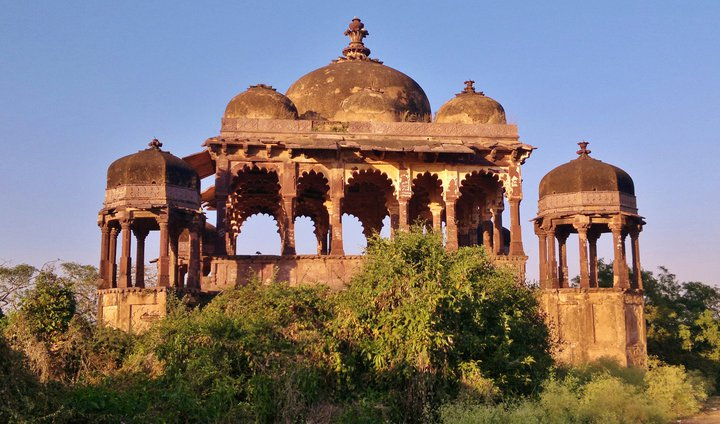
Battees Khamba

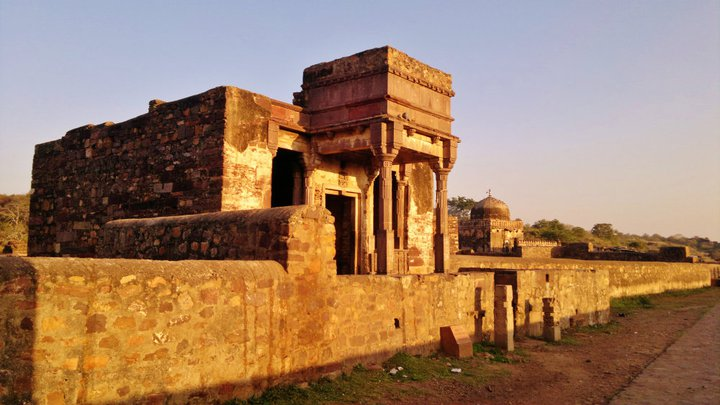
Annapurna Temple

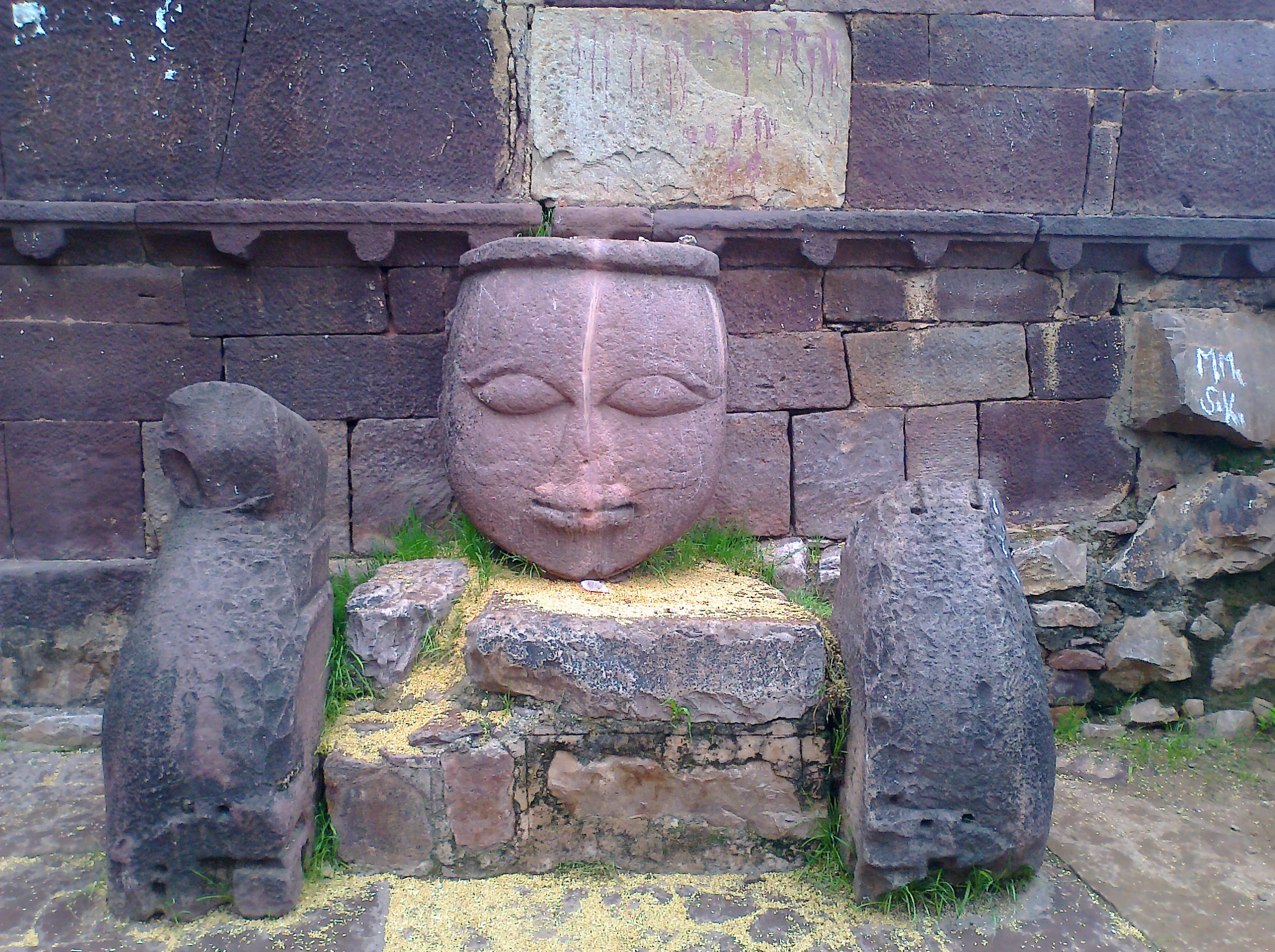
Fine rock art at Ranthambhore Fort

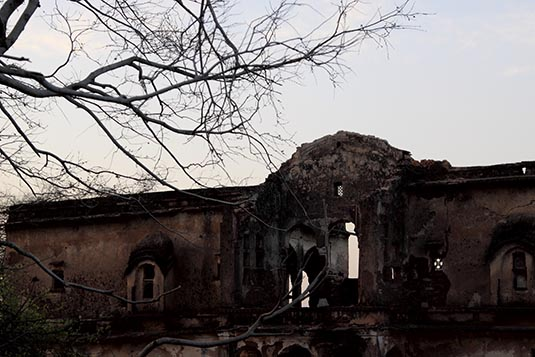
Old tomb, Ranthambore Fort

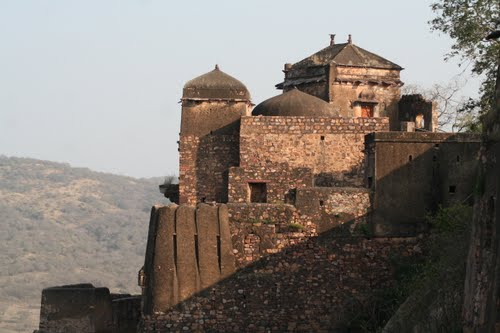
Rani Haveli

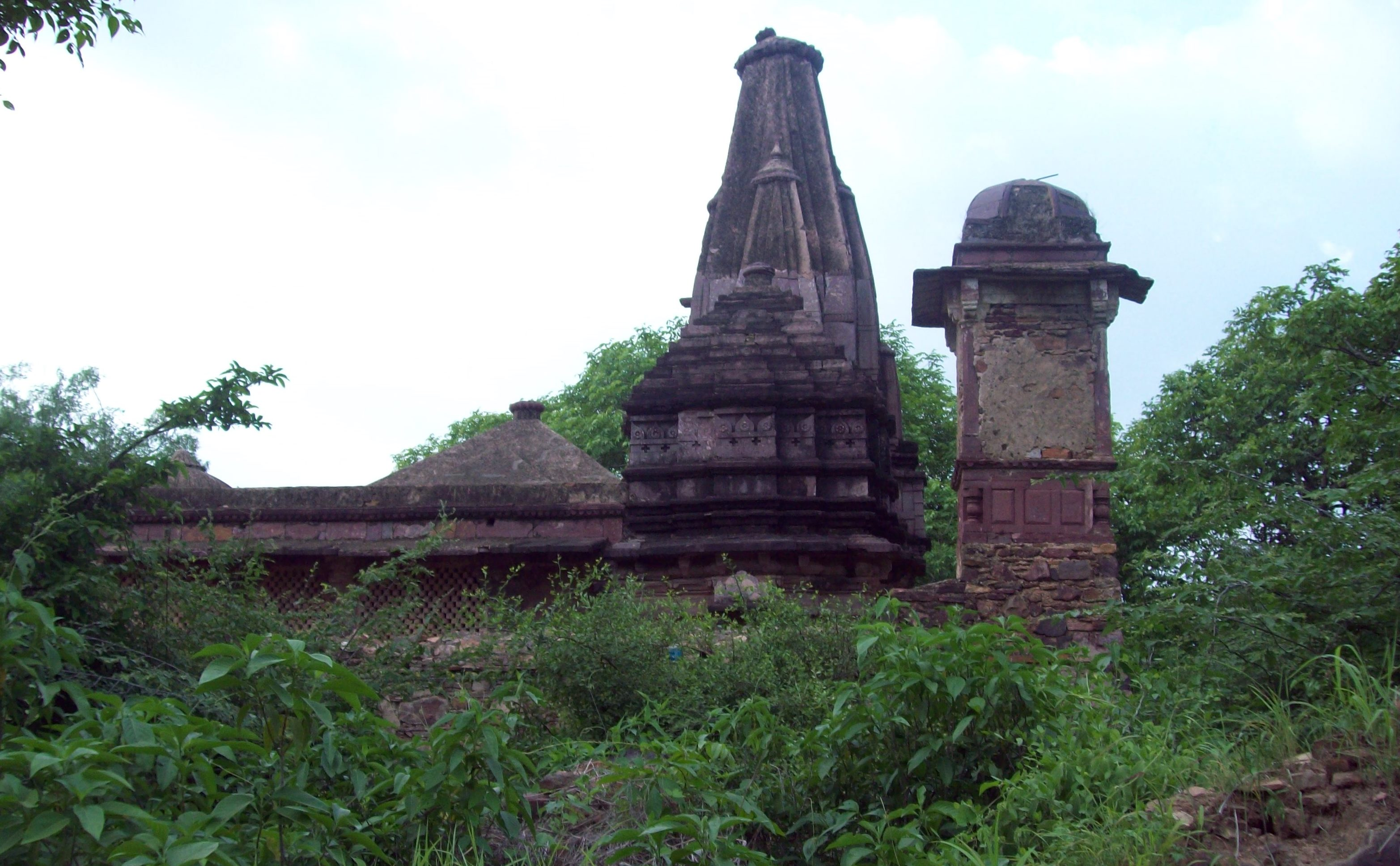
Ranthambore Fort Jain Temple

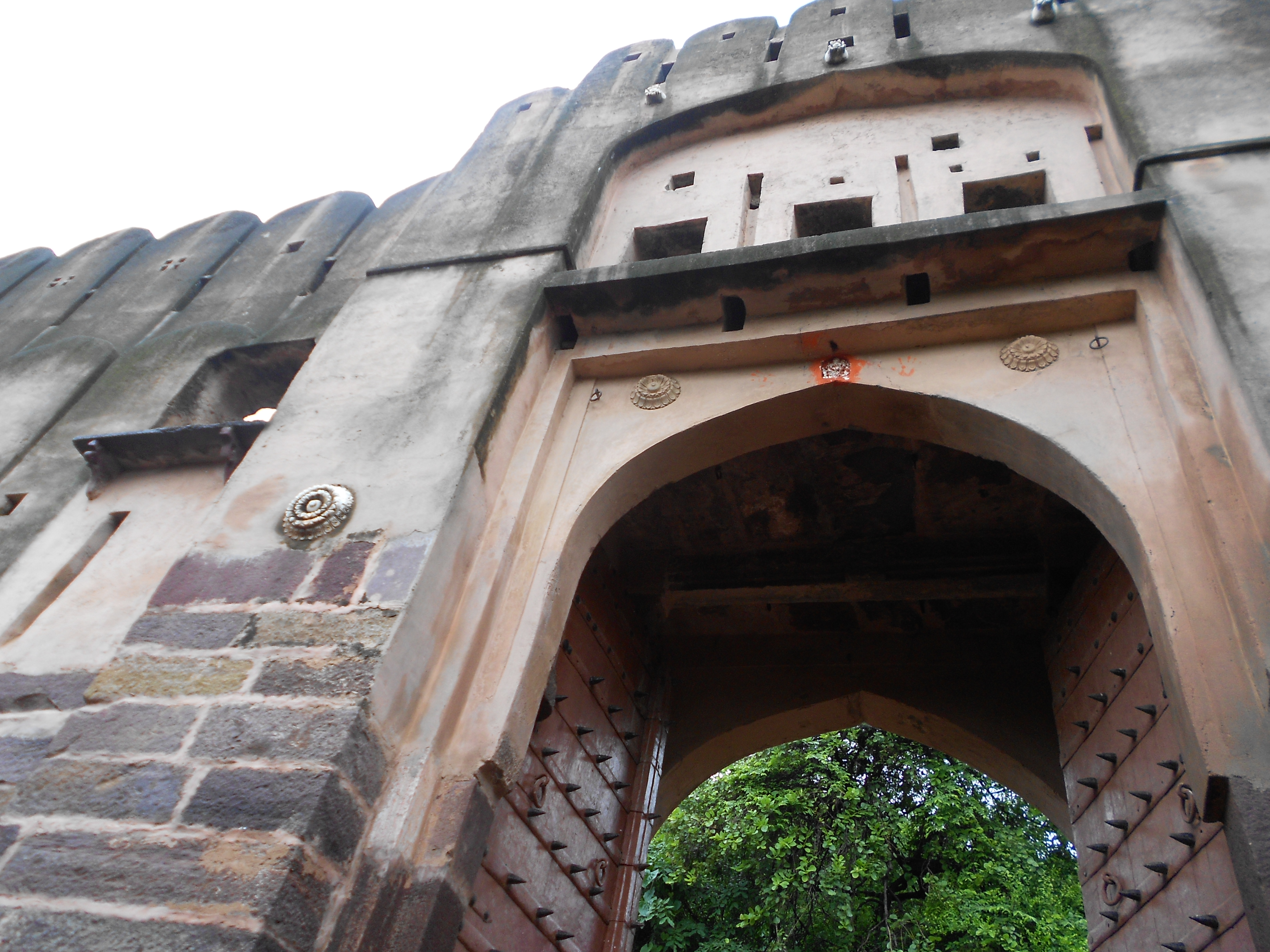
Entrance

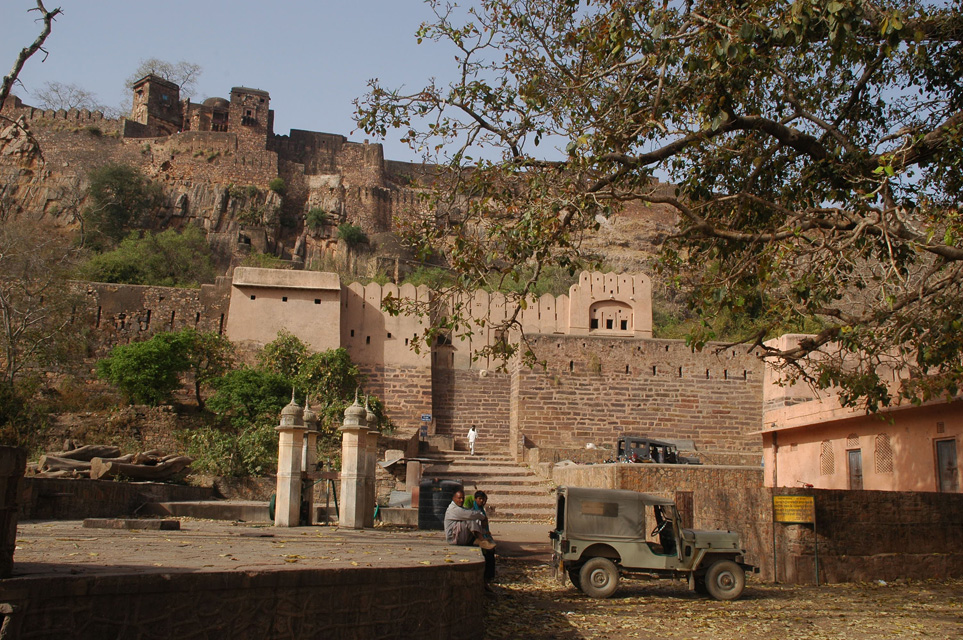
Naulakha Gate, Ranthambhore Fort

== See also ==
- Hill Forts of Rajasthan
- Chamatkarji
- Sawai Madhopur District
- Sawai Madhopur
- Rajiv Gandhi Regional Museum of Natural History
- Shilpgram, Sawai Madhopur
- Sawai Madhopur railway station
