= Sawai Madhopur =

Sawai Madhopur Savāī Mādhōpur Madhopur
- City
- Sawai Madhopur
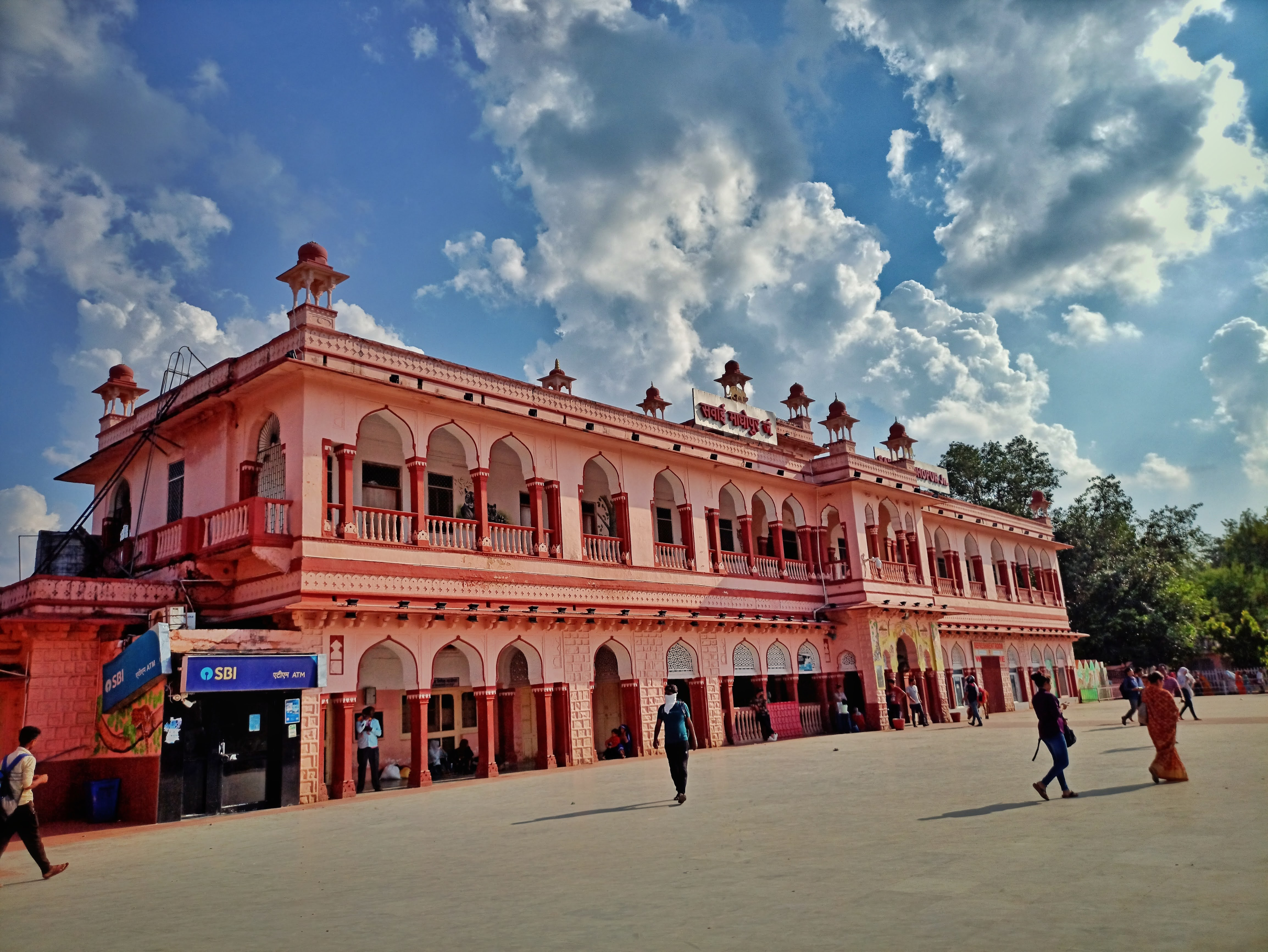
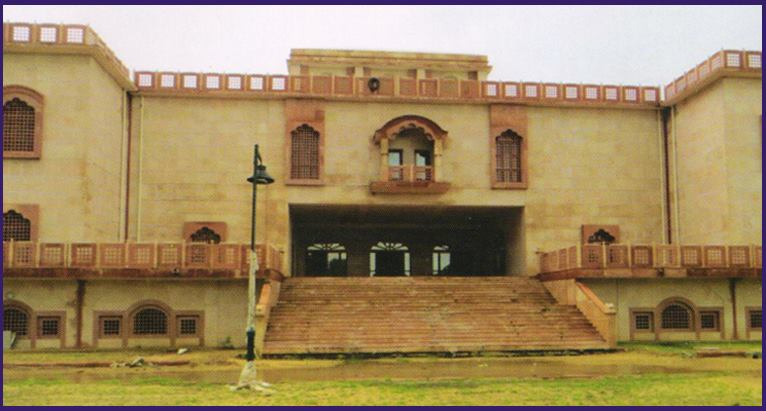
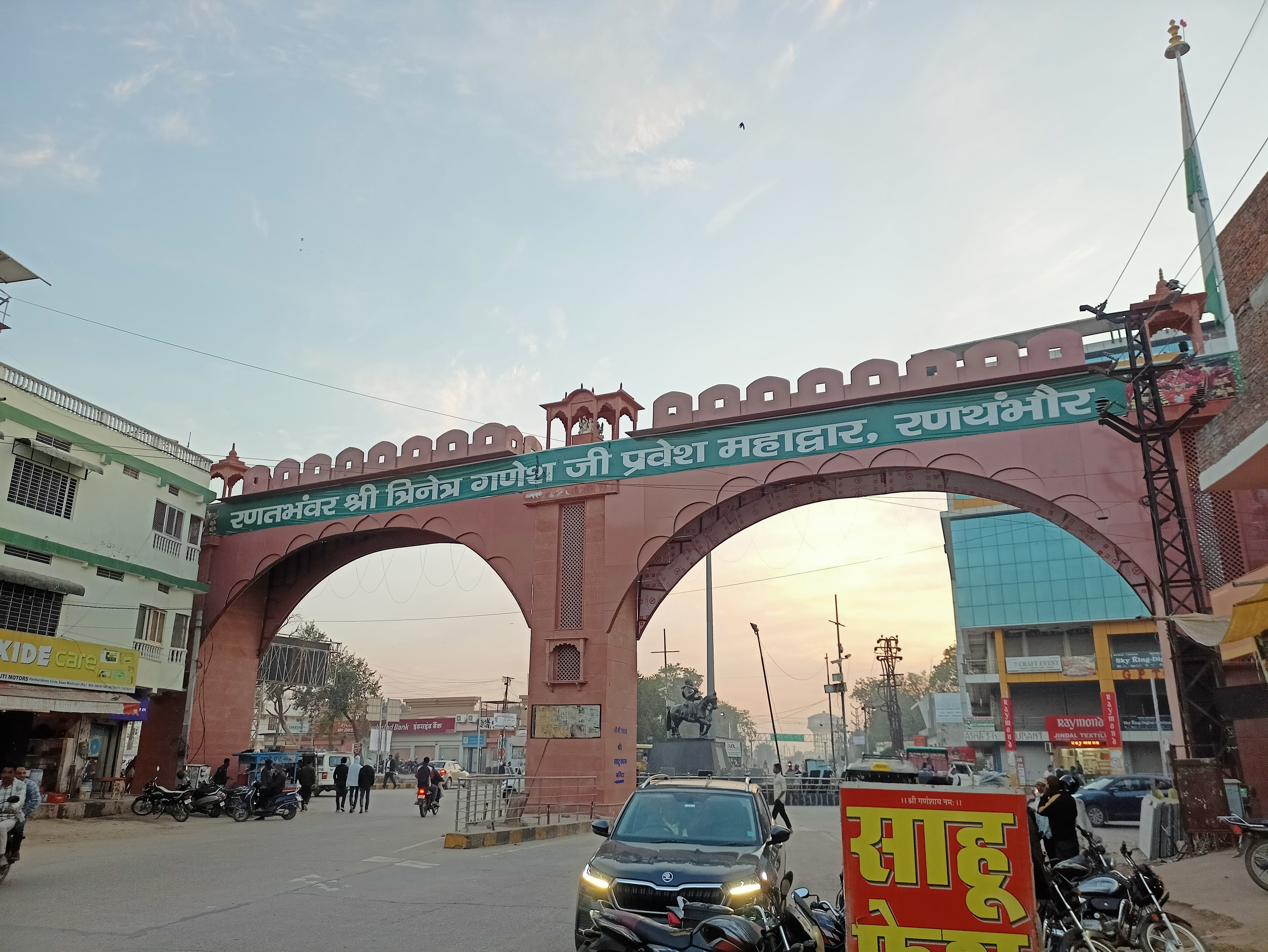
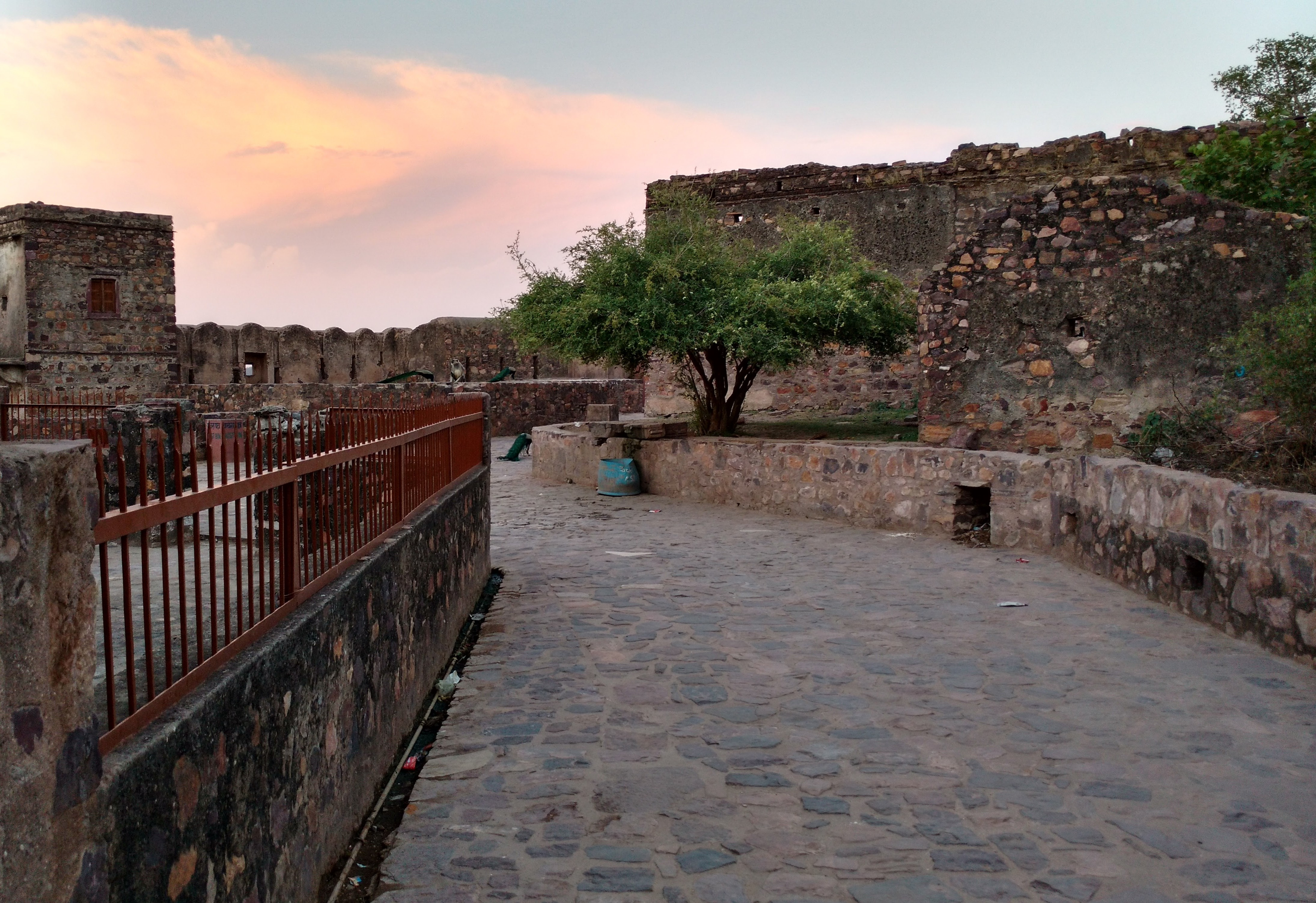
- Sawai Madhopur Junction railway station Rajiv Gandhi Regional Museum of Natural History Ranthambhore Pravesh Maha Dwaar at Hammir Circle, Sawai Madhopur A view of the Ranthambhore Fort in Sawai Madhopur
- Nicknames: Tiger City of Rajasthan, The City of Tigers
- Location in Rajasthan, India Sawai Madhopur (India) Sawai Madhopur (Asia)
- Coordinates: 26°0′N 76°21′E
- Country: India
- State: Rajasthan
- Region: Dhundhar
- District: Sawai Madhopur
- Division: Bharatpur
- Establishment: 19 January 1763; 263 years ago
- Founder: Madho Singh I
- Named for: Sawai Madho Singh

Government
  - Type: Municipal council
  - Body: Sawai Madhopur Municipal Council

Area
  - Total: 59 km^{2} (23 sq mi)
- Elevation: 265.785 m (872.00 ft)

Population (2025)
  - Total: 178,700
  - Rank: 18th
  - Density: 3,000/km^{2} (7,800/sq mi)

Language
  - Official: Hindi
  - Additional official: English
  - Regional: Hindi, Rajasthani, Dhundhari
- Time zone: UTC+05:30 (IST)
- Pincode(s): 322001 (District Headquarter), 322021 (Old City)
- Area code(s): +91-7462
- ISO 3166 code: RJ-IN
- Vehicle registration: RJ-25
- Sex ratio: 922 per 1000 ♂/♀
- Nearest cities: Jaipur, Kota, Gwalior, Tonk, Sheopur, Gangapur City, Niwai, Chauth Ka Barwara
- Climate: BSh
- Website: Sawai Madhopur Municipal Council; Sawai Madhopur District

UNESCO World Heritage Site
- Criteria: Cultural: (ii), (iii)
- Reference: 247
- Inscription: 2013 (37th Session)
- Area: 736 ha (2.84 sq mi)

Sawai Madhopur (IAST: Savāī Mādhōpur, IPA: [səˈʋaːiː ˈmaːdʱoːpʊɾ]) is a city in the south-eastern part of the Indian state of Rajasthan. It serves as the administrative headquarter of the Sawai Madhopur district, and forms a part of the Bharatpur division.

The city is known for its historical significance, cultural heritage, and ecological importance. It is located near Ranthambore National Park, one of India's most prominent wildlife reserves, situated approximately 13 kilometres (8.1 mi) from the city. The national park is a major attraction for wildlife enthusiasts and tourists. Also located in the vicinity is the Ranthambore Fort, a UNESCO World Heritage Site, which adds to the city's cultural and architectural prominence.

== Etymology ==
Sawai Madhopur is named after Maharaja Sawai Madho Singh I (born 20 May 1728 – March 5, 1768) (Reign: c. 1750 – c. 1768), the ruler of Amer, who established the city in 1763 CE. In Sanskrit, the term "pur" (or "pura") is often employed to denote a city or town. "Sawai Madhopur" can be interpreted as "The City of Sawai Madho" or "Sawai Madho's City," serving as a tribute to Maharaja Sawai Madho Singh I, the founder of the city.

== History ==
The early history of Sawai Madhopur can be associated with Ranthambore Fort.

Historical affiliations

Chahamanas of Ranastambhapura 1192–1301
Delhi Sultanate 1301–1526
Mughal Empire 1526–1562
Jaipur State 1562–1949
Rajasthan 30 March 1949–Present

=== Early history ===
The origin of Ranthambore Fort can be traced back to the 8th century when it was initially built by the Chauhan Rajput king, Sapaldaksha. Over the centuries, it underwent several modifications and expansions under different rulers.

=== Chauhan Dynasty (8th to 13th Century) ===
Ranthambore Fort gained prominence during the rule of the Chauhan Dynasty. It served as a strategic stronghold, protecting the region from invasions until the early 13th century. The Chauhan rulers, particularly Rao Hammir Dev, made substantial contributions to fortify and expand the structure.

=== Delhi Sultanate (13th to 14th Century) ===
In 1226, the fort was captured by the Delhi Sultanate under the command of Sultan Iltutmish. It remained under the control of the Delhi Sultanate until the mid-14th century. Alauddin Khilji, another ruler of the Delhi Sultanate, besieged and captured the fort in 1301 after a fierce battle with the Chauhan king Rao Hammir Dev. The fort was further fortified and expanded during this period.

=== Mewar Kingdom (14th to 16th Century) ===
The fort saw a brief period under the control of the Rajput rulers of Mewar. However, it was frequently contested and changed hands multiple times.

=== Mughal era (16th to 18th Century) ===
In the 16th century, Ranthambore Fort came under Mughal rule. Emperors Akbar and Aurangzeb, in particular, recognized its strategic importance. Akbar, known for his interest in architecture, added structures to the fort.

=== Rajput and British Colonial Period (18th to 20th Century) ===
During the 18th century, the fort saw the influence of the Rajputs. It played a crucial role in the power struggles of the time.

In 1754, Mughal Emperor Shah Alam II bestowed this property upon Maharaja Sawai Madho Singh I of Jaipur, who subsequently dedicated it as the Maharaja's exclusive hunting retreat, a tradition upheld ever since.

The fort also has connections to the British era, witnessing the signing of the Treaty of Ranthambore between the British East India Company and the Rajputs in 1818.

Sawai Madhopur was built as a planned walled city by Maharaja Sawai Madho Singh I of the State of Jaipur and the city is named after him. Founded in 1763, Sawai Madhopur celebrates its Foundation Day annually on 19 January.

The Sawai Madhopur Lodge, now a hotel, survives as a relic of the days of tiger hunting from the colonial India. The lodge was built in 1936 by Maharaja Man Singh II (1912 – 1971) and used as a hunting lodge until his death. The two-storey crescent-shaped building is constructed with a long verandah. Queen Elizabeth II of England visited the lodge in January 1961. The former US President, Bill Clinton, along with his family, also visited Ranthambore, Sawai Madhopur on 24 March 2000.

== Geography ==
Sawai Madhopur is located in the south-eastern part of the state of Rajasthan, India. It is home to Ranthambore National Park, one of the largest national parks in northern India. The city is situated at the junction of the Aravalli and Vindhya hill ranges. The city is approximately 121 kilometres (75 mi) southeast of the city of Jaipur.

== Climate ==
Sawai Madhopur experiences a semi-arid climate characterized by distinct seasons. Summers, lasting from March to June, bring extremely high temperatures, often exceeding 40 degrees Celsius (104 degrees Fahrenheit), due to prevailing dry and arid conditions. The peak heat occurs in May and June, reaching up to 47 °C (120 °F). Winters, spanning December to February, are relatively mild with daytime temperatures ranging from 8 to 25 degrees Celsius (46 to 77 degrees Fahrenheit), accompanied by cool nights.

The monsoon season, lasting from July to October, provides relief from the intense summer heat with rain showers. Although the monsoon in Rajasthan is generally less intense than in other parts of India, it is crucial for sustaining agricultural activities, including the cultivation of crops like guava. Post-monsoon months (October to November) mark a transitional period as temperatures gradually decrease, leading to more pleasant weather.

The average annual rainfall in Sawai Madhopur is 800 mm, contributing significantly to the region's ecology. Notably, the monsoon season prompts the closure of Ranthambore National Park. During the summer, the average humidity ranges from 10 to 15 percent, while the rainy season sees an increase to 60 percent. The ideal tourist season in Sawai Madhopur is from October to November and February to April, when the weather is more accommodating for outdoor activities and exploration.

Climate data for Sawai Madhopur (1991–2020, extremes 1969–2012)
Month	Jan	Feb	Mar	Apr	May	Jun	Jul	Aug	Sep	Oct	Nov	Dec	Year
Record high °C (°F)	32.9 (91.2)	36.6 (97.9)	42.2 (108.0)	46.5 (115.7)	48.0 (118.4)	48.0 (118.4)	46.3 (115.3)	40.0 (104.0)	40.9 (105.6)	41.0 (105.8)	36.7 (98.1)	32.0 (89.6)	48.0 (118.4)
Mean daily maximum °C (°F)	22.8 (73.0)	27.5 (81.5)	34.0 (93.2)	39.5 (103.1)	42.3 (108.1)	40.3 (104.5)	34.2 (93.6)	32.0 (89.6)	34.2 (93.6)	34.4 (93.9)	29.8 (85.6)	24.7 (76.5)	33.1 (91.6)
Mean daily minimum °C (°F)	7.8 (46.0)	11.6 (52.9)	17.2 (63.0)	22.9 (73.2)	27.5 (81.5)	27.9 (82.2)	25.2 (77.4)	24.1 (75.4)	23.6 (74.5)	19.3 (66.7)	14.1 (57.4)	9.5 (49.1)	19.2 (66.6)
Record low °C (°F)	−1.0 (30.2)	−1.2 (29.8)	3.5 (38.3)	9.3 (48.7)	14.6 (58.3)	15.0 (59.0)	11.5 (52.7)	16.4 (61.5)	14.0 (57.2)	6.8 (44.2)	2.5 (36.5)	1.0 (33.8)	−1.2 (29.8)
Average rainfall mm (inches)	8.4 (0.33)	8.0 (0.31)	3.4 (0.13)	6.6 (0.26)	9.9 (0.39)	81.9 (3.22)	265.4 (10.45)	275.2 (10.83)	106.6 (4.20)	17.1 (0.67)	8.6 (0.34)	2.2 (0.09)	793.3 (31.23)
Average rainy days	0.7	0.9	0.5	0.7	1.1	4.5	10.5	11.6	4.7	0.9	0.2	0.3	36.6
Average relative humidity (%) (at 17:30 IST)	48	37	31	24	25	39	64	69	57	43	44	49	44
Source: India Meteorological Department

== Population and demographics ==
Population growth through the years
Year	Population
1991	77,690
2001	101,997
2011	121,106
2016	134,915
2022	165,000
2025	178,700

Sawai Madhopur had 22,841 households as per the 2011 Census of India. The recorded population at that time was 121,106, including 15,620 children in the 0–6 age group. Scheduled Castes accounted for 26,758 individuals, while Scheduled Tribes numbered 5,926. Some local administrative estimates place the population at around 165,000 in 2022.

== Religion ==
As per the 2011 Census of India, Hinduism was followed by 74.71 percent of the population in Sawai Madhopur. Islam accounted for 20.11 percent of residents. Jainism was followed by 4.38 percent, Sikhism by 0.39 percent, and Christianity by 0.21 percent. Buddhism was recorded at 0.04 percent.

Religions in Sawai Madhopur City
Hinduism	74.71%
Islam	20.11%
Jainism	4.38%
Christianity	0.21%
Sikh	0.39%
others	0.2%
Distribution of religions

== Governance ==
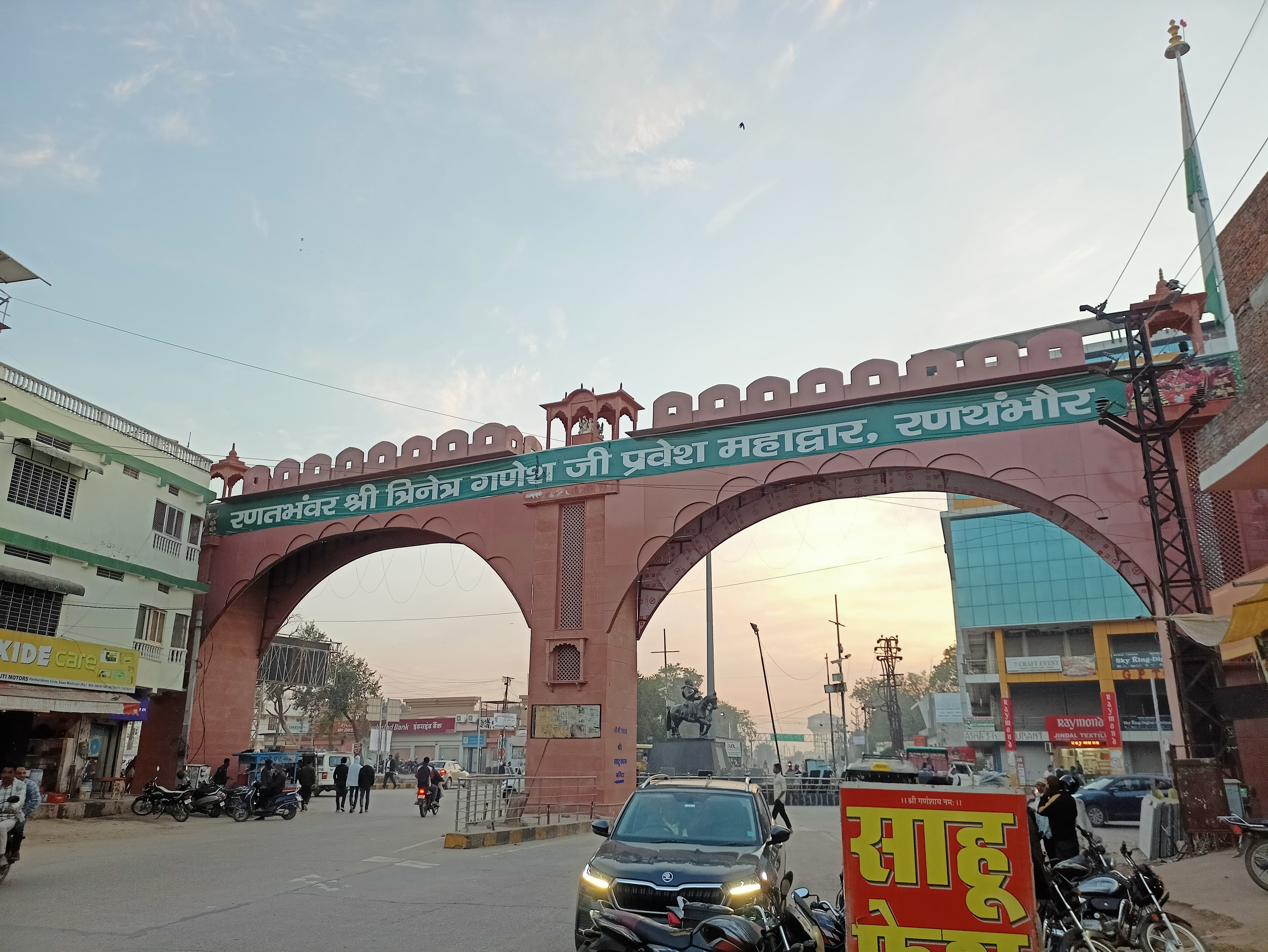
Ranthambore Pravesh Maha Dwaar at Hamir Circle, Sawai Madhopur

The Nagar Parishad (City Council or Municipal Corporation) of Sawai Madhopur is the body responsible for the city's civil works and administration. The Municipal Corporation is headed by a chairman. Each of 60 wards is represented in the Municipal Corporation by an elected member. The Urban Improvement Trust (UIT) of Sawai Madhopur is the government agency responsible for the planning and development of the city.

Sawai Madhopur is one of four Assembly constituencies within Sawai Madhopur district. The others are Gangapur, Bamanwas and Khandar. Sawai Madhopur lies in the Tonk–Sawai Madhopur Lok Sabha constituency.

The political representative, i.e. Member of Legislative Assembly (MLA) of Sawai Madhopur Assembly, is Dr Kirodi Lal Meena, who won the 2023 Assembly Election of Rajasthan from the ruling party, Bharatiya Janata Party (BJP).

The Member of Parliament (MP) from Tonk–Sawai Madhopur Lok Sabha constituency is Harish Chandra Meena from the Indian National Congress.

== Economy ==
The economy of Sawai Madhopur is based primarily on agriculture, horticulture, tourism and hospitality. Large-scale industry is limited due to environmental regulations related to forest and wildlife protection. Jaipur Udyog Limited operated one of Asia’s largest cement factories in the city until its closure in 1987.

It is noteworthy that the city lacks significant large-scale manufacturing plants and industry, due to ecological and environmental concerns.

Apart from tigers, Sawai Madhopur is also renowned nationwide for its guava cultivation. Guava cultivation has expanded extensively in Sawai Madhopur, with guava nurseries from the region even supplying to nurseries in Uttar Pradesh. The annual business generated from guava in Sawai Madhopur now amounts to approximately three to five billion rupees. In 1985, the first guava in the area was grown on a farm of five hectares in Karmoda village. In 2015, retail and wholesale markets for guava generated more than 5 billion rupees of revenue. In 2015, five thousand hectares of land were dedicated to cultivating guava. Other products from the city include wooden toys, handcrafted items, poppyseed's perfumes, essential oils and traditional medicines.

=== The Old Walled City ===
Sawai Madhopur was established in 1763 CE by Maharaja Madho Singh I. The old city area is located between the Aravali and Vindhya hill ranges, near the forests of Ranthambore National Park. Locally known as Purānā Shahar (Old City) or simply Shahar, it is situated on the eastern side of the greater urban expanse of Sawai Madhopur. The city was planned on a layout similar to that of the old walled city of Jaipur. The walled section covers approximately 3 square kilometres, with an estimated perimeter of about 8 kilometres. It contains narrow streets and densely populated neighbourhoods such as Sadar Bazaar, Pallipaar, Chhota Rajbagh, Bada Rajbagh, Mirza Mohalla and Ramdwara. The area also includes several historic temples, mosques and other older structures.

=== Alanpur ===
Situated between Bazariya and the Old City, accommodates a significant portion of the city's Muslim population. Notable landmarks include the renowned Chamatkar Jain Temple. Covering an area of about 4 square kilometres with a perimeter of approximately 8 kilometres, Alanpur comprises neighbourhoods like Alanpur, Vinoba Basti, Housing Board Colony, Hanuman Nagar, Adinath Nagar, Patel Nagar, and Raj Vihar Colony, with a scattered population distribution.

=== Bazariya ===
A relatively newer development on Sawai Madhopur's western side, encompasses diverse neighbourhoods such as Bal Mandir Colony, Indra Colony, Adarsh Nagar, Sahu Nagar, Gulab Bagh, Meena Colony, Jawahar Nagar Colony, Ganesh Nagar, and Kherda. The word Bazariya is a Persian word, which is derived from the word Bazaar, transl. 'A Place for Market''. This area serves as a hub for local businesses, financial centres, commercial offices, governmental and educational institutions, including the railway station, Collectorate, Police headquarters, District court, and Civil Lines. Spanning approximately 15 square kilometres with a perimeter of around 18 kilometres, Bazariya represents a vital administrative, financial, educational, and commercial centre within the city's urban fabric.

Sawai Madhopur's urban expanse extends across approximately 59 square kilometres.

== Fairs and festivals ==
=== Sawai Madhopur Utsav ===
The Sawai Madhopur Utsav is the annual celebration held on the foundation day of the city of Sawai Madhopur on 19 January. It is the day on which the city of Sawai Madhopur was established by Maharaja Sawai Madho Singh I in 1763.

The Ganesh Chaturthi Fair is the largest of Sawai Madhopur's fairs. It is celebrated over three days on Bhadav Shukla Chaturthi at the Trinetra Ganesh Temple in Ranthambore Fort. Dussehra is celebrated in Sawai Madhopur for 10 days in the month of October.

The Chauth Mata Mela fair is held in the month of January, at Chauth Mata Temple in Chauth Ka Barwara.

== Culture ==
The languages and dialects commonly spoken in Sawai Madhopur are Hindi, English, Rajasthani (Dhundari, Hadoti).

Typical cuisine in Sawai Madhopur include Dal Baati Choorma, Gatte Ki Sabzi, Bajre Ki Roti and Dal Bade. The sweet dishes include Kharbuja Laddu (Muskmelon Sweet).

Popular dance forms in Sawai Madhopur include the Ghoomar dance, and the Kalbelia dance.

== Places of interest ==
=== Ranthambore National Park ===
The Ranthambore National Park is one of the largest national parks in India. It is situated about 11 kilometres (6.8 mi) from Sawai Madhopur. In 1955, it was established as the Sawai Madhopur Game Sanctuary. In 1973, the land became a Project Tiger reserve. The area was renamed the Ranthambore National Park in 1980. In 1984, the adjacent forests were declared the Sawai Man Singh Sanctuary and Keladevi Sanctuary, and in 1991 the tiger reserve was enlarged to include Sawai Man Singh and Keladevi Sanctuaries.

Ranthambore is known for its population of Bengal tigers. The park provides a natural habitat for the tigers as well as numerous other species, including leopards, sloth bears, crocodiles, and a variety of bird species. The diverse flora and fauna contribute to the park's ecological importance.

Ranthambore attracts wildlife enthusiasts, photographers, and nature lovers from around the world. The park offers safari experiences and is divided into different zones, each offering a unique safari experience.

=== Ranthambore Fort ===
Ranthambore Fort is situated in Sawai Madhopur district of Rajasthan, India. The fort is a formidable structure that has witnessed centuries of change, from the era of Rajput rule to the Mughal period and beyond.

==== Historical background ====
The fort's origins are believed to date back to the 8th century when it was initially constructed by the Chauhan Rajputs. Its strategic location atop a hill provided a vantage point for monitoring the surrounding region. Over the centuries, the fort underwent several modifications and expansions under different rulers, reflecting the complex history of the region. In 1296 CE, Rao Hammir Deva held the fort. Notable features of the fort include the Toran Dwar, Mahadeo Chhatri, Sameton Ki Haveli, the 32-Pillared Chhatri, Mosque, and the Trinetra Ganesh Temple.

==== Architectural marvel ====
The architecture of Ranthambore Fort is a fusion of Rajput and Mughal styles. The massive stone walls, bastions, and gates showcase the military acumen of the Rajputs. Inside the fort, there are palaces, temples, and water tanks that highlight the influence of Mughal architecture. The Ganesh Temple within the fort is a significant religious site and attracts pilgrims and tourists alike.

==== Cultural significance ====
Ranthambore Fort has been witness to numerous battles and political changes throughout its existence. It played a crucial role during the reign of Prithviraj Chauhan and was later conquered by the Mughals under Emperor Akbar. The fort's resilience and strategic importance have been celebrated in various historical accounts and local folklore.

==== Conservation efforts ====
In recent times, there has been a growing emphasis on the conservation of Ranthambore Fort. Efforts have been made to preserve its architectural integrity, with restoration projects aimed at maintaining its historical grandeur. The fort's inclusion in UNESCO's tentative list of World Heritage Sites underscores its global significance.

==== Tourist attraction ====
Ranthambore Fort stands as a major tourist attraction, drawing history enthusiasts, wildlife lovers, and photographers alike. The juxtaposition of the fort's ancient stones against the lush greenery of the surrounding national park creates a picturesque setting.

=== Chauth Mata Temple ===
Chauth Mata Temple is located in Chauth Ka Barwara, near the city of Sawai Madhopur. Chauth Mata is the Kuldevi (ancestral deity) of Meena community of Rajasthan. The temple is located on a hilltop of Chauth Ka Barwara, 25 km away from Sawai Madhopur, near the Six Senses Fort Barwara, a 5-star resort-hotel and wedding destination.

=== Rajiv Gandhi Regional Museum of Natural History ===
On 23 December 2007, the foundation stone laying ceremony of Rajiv Gandhi Regional Museum of Natural History in Sawai Madhopur, was officiated by Hamid Ansari, Vice President of India. The museum focuses on the wildlife, ecology, ecosystem, geology, zoology, biodiversity, and environment of the western arid region of India.

=== Chamatkar Ji Jain Temple ===
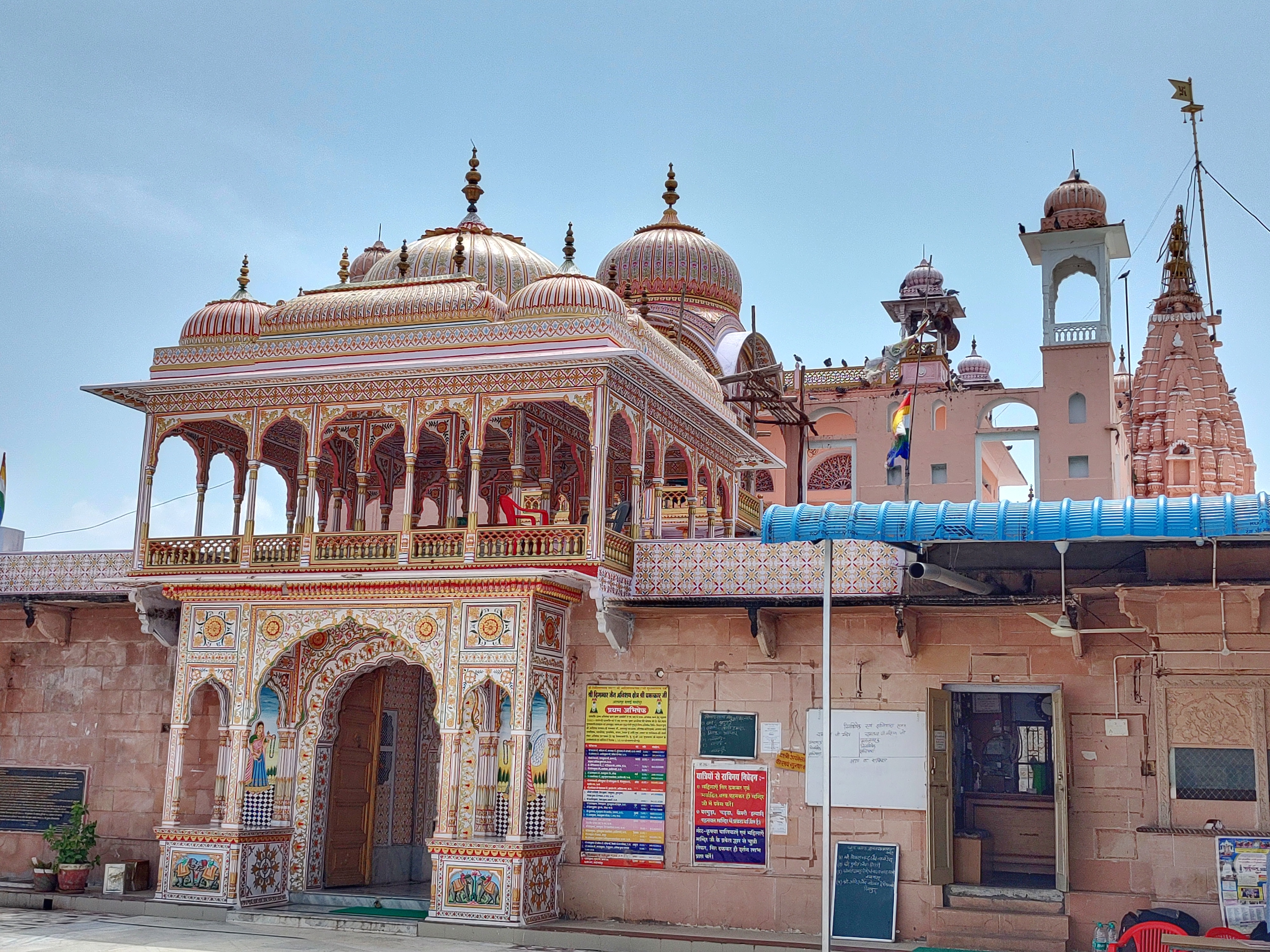
Chamatkarji Jain temple

Chamatkar Ji Jain temple is located in Alanpur, Sawai Madhopur. The temple dates back to the early medieval period. It is built in the Pancharatha style with main shrine housing the idol of Shri Rishabhanatha Ji, the first Tirthankara of Jainism.

=== Shilpgram, Sawai Madhopur ===
Shilpgram is Sawai Madhopur's rural arts and crafts complex. It is a living ethnographic museum of the West Zone of India which includes five states. Special emphasis is laid on workshops for children on arts, crafts, culture, theatre, and music. It is located 9 km outside Sawai Madhopur in Ramsinghpura village.

=== Temples ===
==== Kala-Gora Bhairav Temple ====
Kala Gora Bhairav Temple (alias Kala-Gora Bhairo Ji) established in Sawai Madhopur is a 9-storey mystical ancient temple. Situated on a hill near the entrance of the old city of Sawai Madhopur, this temple is a notable example of architecture, mysticism, occult, and tantric accomplishments. Kala Gora Bhairav Temple was built by the then Maharaja Madho Singh I in 1763 AD. This temple is situated amidst the Aravali hills of Ranthambore adjacent to the Bhairo Darwaza (Bhairo Gate), the western entrance to the old walled-city of Sawai Madhopur. This temple is known for tantric worship and occult practices, thus Kala Gora Bhairav Temple of Sawai Madhopur comes second in tantric knowledge after the Kamakhya Temple.

==== Galta Ji Temple ====
Galta Ji Temple is a historic Shri Ram-Sita temple in the north-eastern outskirts of old walled-city. The temple is inspired by Jaipur city's Galta Ji temple.

==== Ghatila Balaji Temple ====
Ghatila Balaji Temple was built on the peak of the northern hills of old Sawai Madhopur city, from where a panoramic view of Sawai Madhopur city can be seen.

==== Sita Mata Temple ====
Sita Mata Temple, situated in the Ranthambore hills near the town of Sawai Madhopur, is a place of worship and picnic spot, the waterfalls here attract tourists especially during the rains and monsoons.

==== Amareshwar Mahadev Temple ====
Amareshwar Mahadev Temple located in Sawai Madhopur is considered one of the major religious places here. Not only this, the temple is also counted among the important religious attractions of Rajasthan. This temple is situated on the route between Ranthambore and Sawai Madhopur. Amareshwar Mahadev Temple, situated amidst lush green hills, has also emerged as a major tourist and picnic spot for the residents here. Since it is an ancient temple, people from far and wide come here in large numbers.

Another popular temple close by the city is the Balaji Temple of Itawa village, dedicated to Lord Hanuman.

== Education ==
=== Institute of Hotel Management ===
On 1 September 2015, the Government of India inaugurated an Institute of Hotel Management at Sawai Madhopur to develop the hospitality sector and promote tourism.

=== Colleges ===
- Apex College of IT & Management
- Government Girls College
- Government Polytechnic College
- Gulshan College of Nursing
- Institute of Hospitality Management
- Jamvay Girls College
- Maharaja Hammir College
- Ranthambore PG College
- Sawai Madhopur College of Engineering and Technology
- Shahid Captain Ripudaman Singh PG College

== Transportation ==
=== Air ===
Sawai Madhopur is served by a non-commercial aerodrome located on the outskirts of the city, which is mainly used for private and chartered flights. The airstrip includes helipads both within its premises and near Ranthambore National Park, allowing for helicopter services related to tourism and official visits.

Supreme Airlines had started regular flight operations between Sawai Madhopur and Delhi from 11 April 2018. Although, commercial air travel and services from Sawai Madhopur were soon stopped due to security reasons and construction works at the airstrip, and no air services remained operational. Currently, no commercial flights operate from Sawai Madhopur. The aerodrome is used for business aviation, VIP and government movement, medical evacuations, and luxury travel.

The nearest large airports are: Jaipur International Airport (JAI), 132 kilometres (82 mi) away; Kishangarh Airport (KQH), Ajmer, 224 kilometres (139 mi); Pandit Deen Dayal Upadhyay Airport, Agra, 235 kilometres (146 mi) away; and Indira Gandhi International Airport (DEL) in New Delhi, 325 kilometres (202 mi) away from Sawai Madhopur city.

=== Rail ===
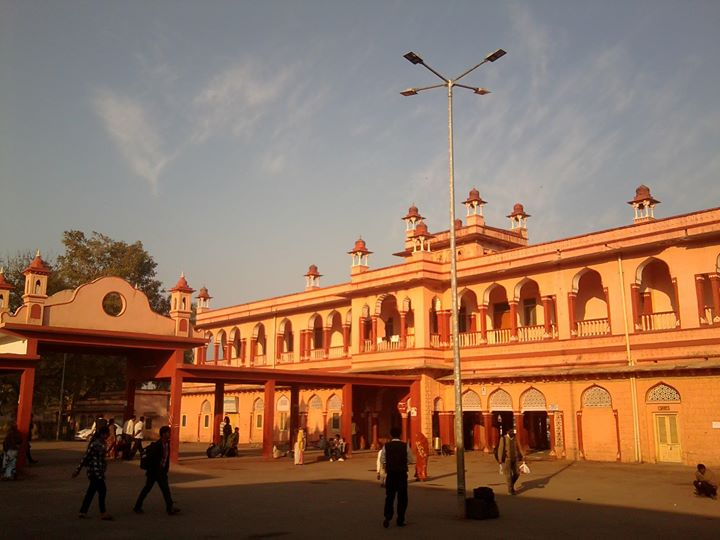
Sawai Madhopur Junction

Sawai Madhopur Junction railway station serves as a significant and major stop for nearly every train along the Delhi-to-Mumbai trunk route. Sawai Madhopur railway station is a major junction connecting Jaipur with the Delhi–Mumbai Railway Line.

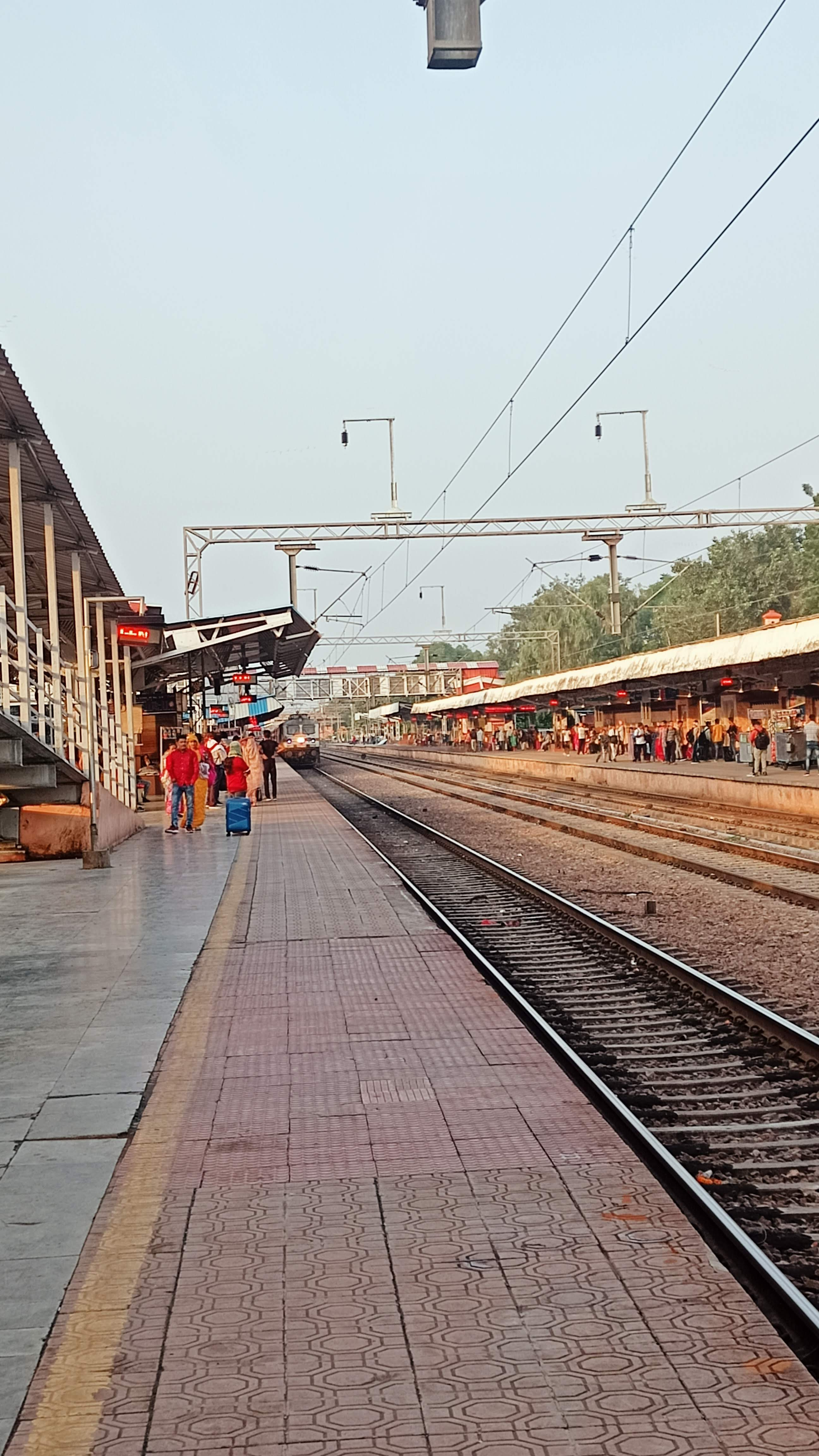
Sawai Madhopur railway station platform

The city is a stop for many local, express, mail and premium trains, including Jaipur– Indore Super-Fast, Ananya Express, Hazrat Nizamuddin–Thiruvananthapuram Central SF Express (via Alappuzha), Dayodaya Express (Ajmer–Jabalpur Express), Jodhpur–Indore Intercity, Hazrat Nizamuddin–Indore Express, Marusagar Express (Ajmer–Ernakulam Express / Ernakulam Express), Jaipur–Mysore Express, Jaipur–Chennai Express, Jaipur–Coimbatore Express, Jodhpur–Puri Express, Jodhpur–Bhopal Express, Jodhpur–Indore Intercity, Patliputra–Udaipur City Humsafar Express, New Delhi–Indore Intercity SF Express (via Ujjain), Hisar–Kota Express, and the August Kranti Tejas Rajdhani Express.

The Jaipur–Indore Super-Fast connects Sawai Madhopur to Indore, a major city in Madhya Pradesh. There is also a Jan Shatabdi Express train from Sawai Madhopur to the national capital, Delhi. The Patna–Kota Express connects Sawai Madhopur and Patna cities via Agra, Kanpur, Lucknow, and Varanasi.

Sawai Madhopur Junction is also a stoppage for major premium trains like Mumbai-Nizamuddin August Kranti Rajdhani Express, Hamsafar Express, Hisar–Mumbai Central Duronto Express, and Kota–Hazrat Nizamuddin Jan Shatabdi Express.

These trains are convenient and direct ways to connect Sawai Madhopur with all major Tier-1 and Tier-2 cities of India, like Delhi, Mumbai, Jaipur, Kota, Jodhpur, Udaipur, Bikaner, Ajmer, Indore, Ujjain, Vadodara, Pune, Nagpur, Chennai, Bangalore, Hyderabad, Thiruvananthapuram, Madurai, Lucknow, Ahmedabad, Surat, Agra, Kanpur, Mathura, Dehradun, Haridwar, Amritsar, Chandigarh, Kolkata, Patna, Jammu, Bhopal, Jabalpur, Bhubaneswar, Guwahati and many others.

Luxury trains include the Palace on Wheels, the Royal Rajasthan on Wheels, and the Maharajas' Express which makes a stop at Sawai Madhopur on an eight-day round trip to tourist destinations.

=== Roads ===
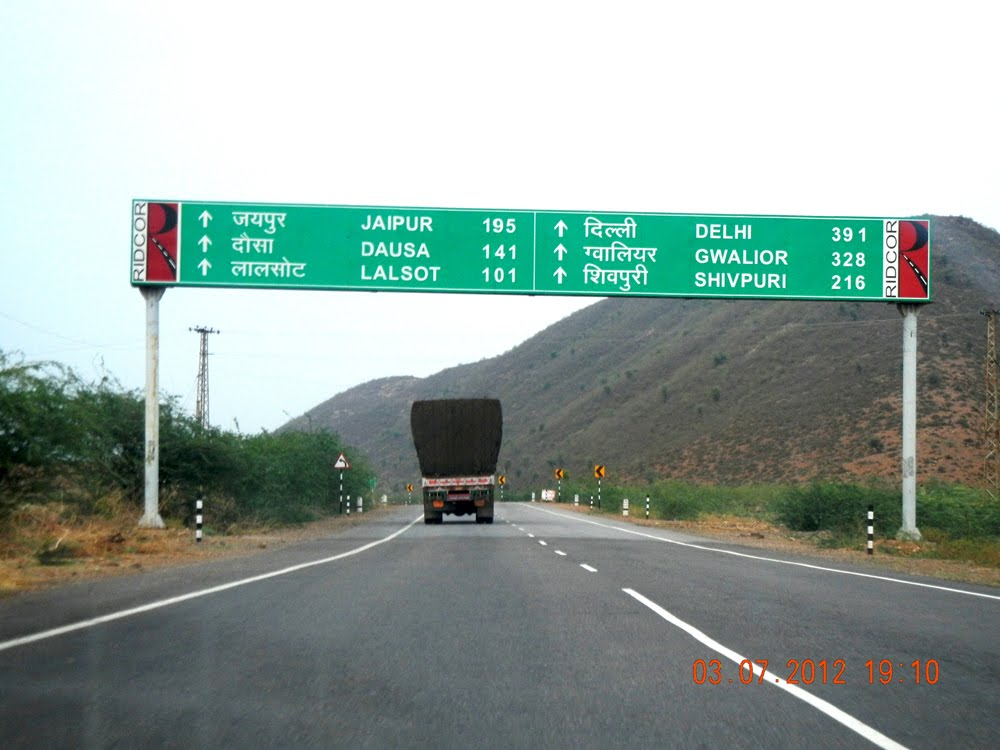
Kota-Lalsot Highway

The National Highway 552 (Tonk-Sawai Madhopur), State Highway-1 (Kota-Lalsot Mega Highway), and State Highway-122 (Rajasthan), connecting Tonk to Karauli pass through the city.

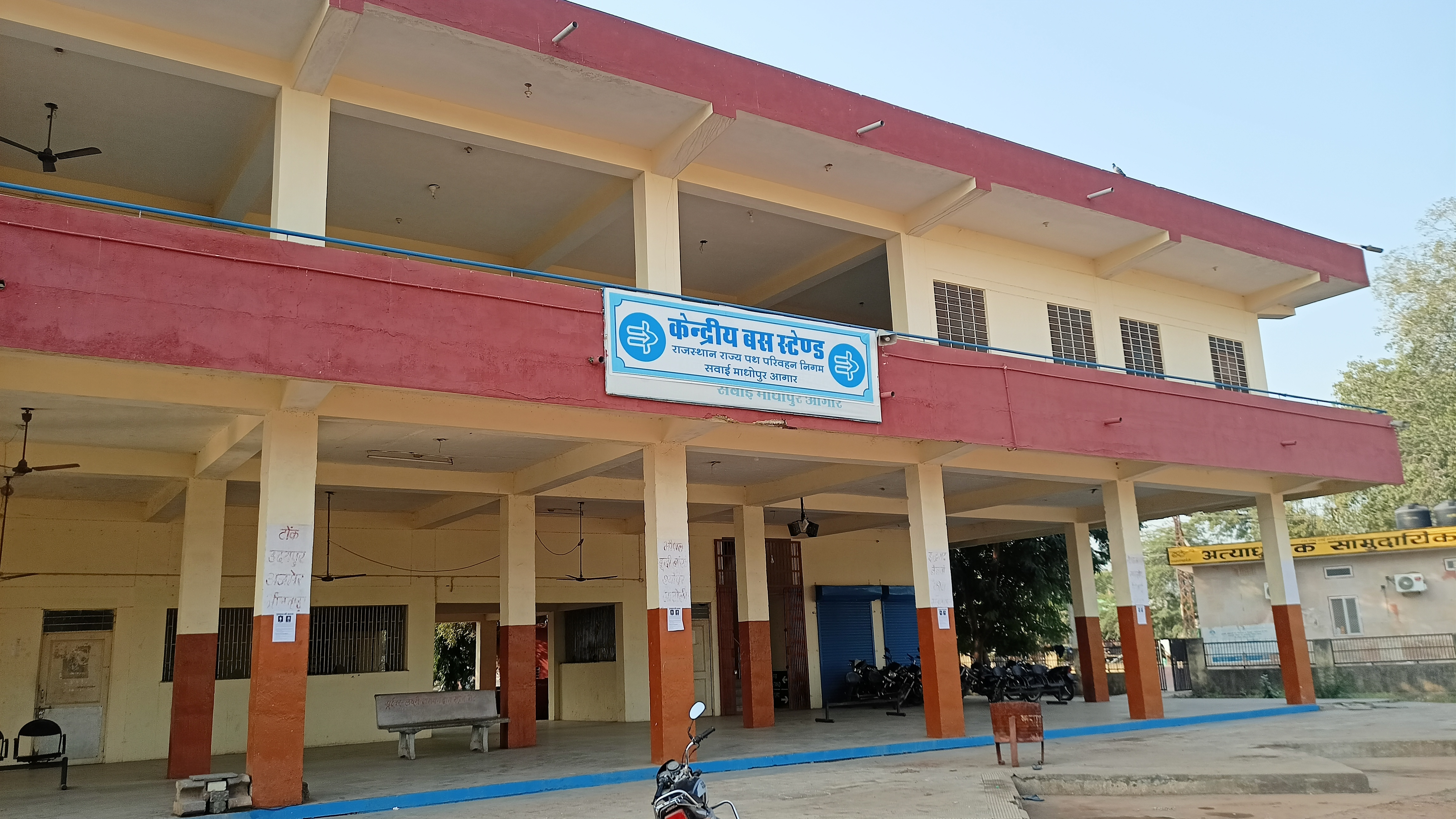
Sawai Madhopur Central Bus Stand

Sawai Madhopur is well-connected by road with Jaipur, Kota, Tonk, Lalsot, Gangapur City, Hindaun City, Karauli, Bundi, Dausa, Sheopur, Shivpuri, Guna, Niwai, Baran, Jodhpur, Alwar, Bhiwadi, Deoli, Jhalawar, Ajmer and Delhi-NCR.

The new and modern Delhi–Mumbai Expressway also passes near Sawai Madhopur city, which makes Sawai Madhopur's connectivity with cities like Delhi-NCR and Mumbai easier.

== Media ==
The largest circulated daily newspapers in Sawai Madhopur are the Rajasthan Patrika and Dainik Bhaskar. The All India Radio (A.I.R./Akashvani) and the local FM radio station, 101.5 MHz broadcast programs in Hindi and Rajasthani.

== See also ==
- Ghushmeshwar Temple
- Chauth Mata Temple
- Barwara
- Ranthambore National Park
- Ranthambore Fort
- Rajiv Gandhi Regional Museum of Natural History
- Shilpgram, Sawai Madhopur
- Sawai Madhopur railway station
- Sawai Madhopur district
- List of cities and towns in Rajasthan
