= Van Ingen & Van Ingen =

Indian taxidermists

A signature Van Ingen & Van Ingen taxidermy tiger head mount on shield

Van Ingen & Van Ingen, simply Van Ingen, or Van Ingen of Mysore (1900–1999) were Indian taxidermists located in Mysore, South India, best known for their tiger and leopard taxidermy trophy mounts. The Van Ingen factory processed more than 43,000 tiger and leopard trophies in less than 90 years of operation. Van Ingen & Van Ingen taxidermy today are still found throughout the world in the form of head mounts, full mounts, flat animal rugs, and rug mounts with heads attached.

Van Ingen & Van Ingen served the highest in international nobility as well as the Maharajas of India, preserving their "shikar" hunting trophies in the most lifelike poses and in the utmost beauty, with attention to detail like no other in their time of operation.

== Foundations ==
The Van Ingen & Van Ingen firm was established by Eugene Van Ingen in the 1890s. He married Adelina (Patti) Wheal, daughter of the Maharaja of Jaipur's horse trainer John Wheal. They had five children, and three sons, DeWet, Botha and Joubert joined their father in the business. Joubert later ran the business until it officially closed in 1995, with some work continuing until 1999.

== Work ==
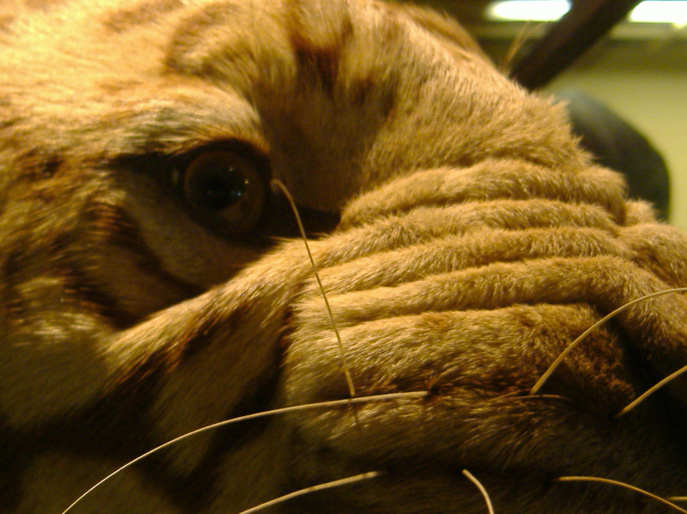
Close up of a snarling Van Ingen mount

Van Ingen & Van Ingen's work was synonymous with quality and fine workmanship, constructing moulds, mannikins, glass eyes, tongues, teeth and even whiskers for jobs of all different sizes of big cat skins and hunting trophies that customers would bring to them. The "snarling" open mouth expression of finished big cat mounts was one of the Van Ingen's trademark qualities, a feature rigorously studied and made possible only by special head moulds which had specific built grooves on the nose area.

Glass eyes were imported from Germany, hand painted individually by a factory workman each pair painted specifically for each individual taxidermy mount. Van Ingen constructed mannikins and moulds of all sizes meaning they could produce mounts of consistent quality for a variety of poses from head mounts to full mount life size pieces.

== Heyday ==
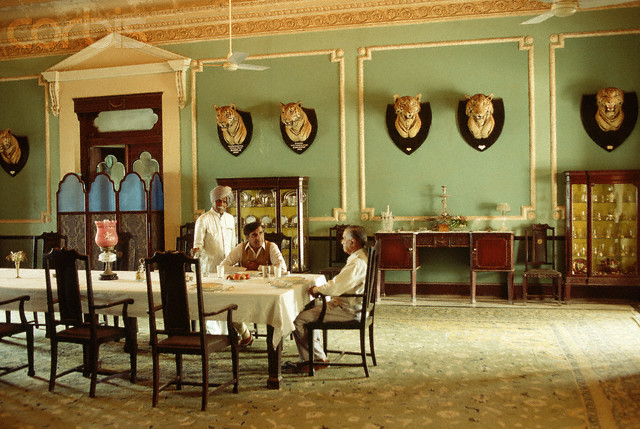
Van Ingen tiger heads mounted on the wall of Indian palace

In its heyday, Van Ingen & Van Ingen was one of the biggest taxidermy businesses in the world. Factory records reveal that Van Ingen & Van Ingen would process over 400 tigers per yer from the 1930s until the late 1960s. Their trade was not limited to only tigers and leopards, but also bears, lions, other species of cat, ungulates and even African game. Film stars, viceroys and senior military men were numbered among their customers, but at least a third of the taxidermy was done for the Indian nobility. The firm employed over 150 workers to support the high workload, with jobs from cleaning, skinning, salting, pickling, mounting, carpentry, finishing, decorating and offloading. Work began to decline in the late 1960s, following the banning of hunting in India.

The firm remained lightly active until 1999 when it closed.

== Legacy ==
In 2004, Pat Morris travelled to Mysuru to document what would remain left of the taxidermy firm, meeting the last survivor of the business's management, Joubert Van Ingen. Morris would go on to author and publish the book Van Ingen & Van Ingen - Artists in Taxidermy in 2006 which outlines the quality, complexity and history of what once was one of the world's largest taxidermy firms. The book also contains actual photocopies of the factory workbook records of the Van Ingen work flow.

The book, Van Ingen & Van Ingen, Artists in Taxidermy is considered the main source for information of the firm with studies of original factory records that reveal the abundance of wild leopards and tigers once found in the wild.

One of the three brothers De Wet Van Ingen (now deceased), still holds the record for the largest Mahseer ever caught on a rod. A cast of the original fish caught was donated to the Regional Museum of Natural History (RMNH), Siddarthanagar, Mysore by Joubert. RMNH also houses a sizable collection of Van Ingen taxidermy mounts which are displayed all round the year.

== Van Ingen & Van Ingen today ==
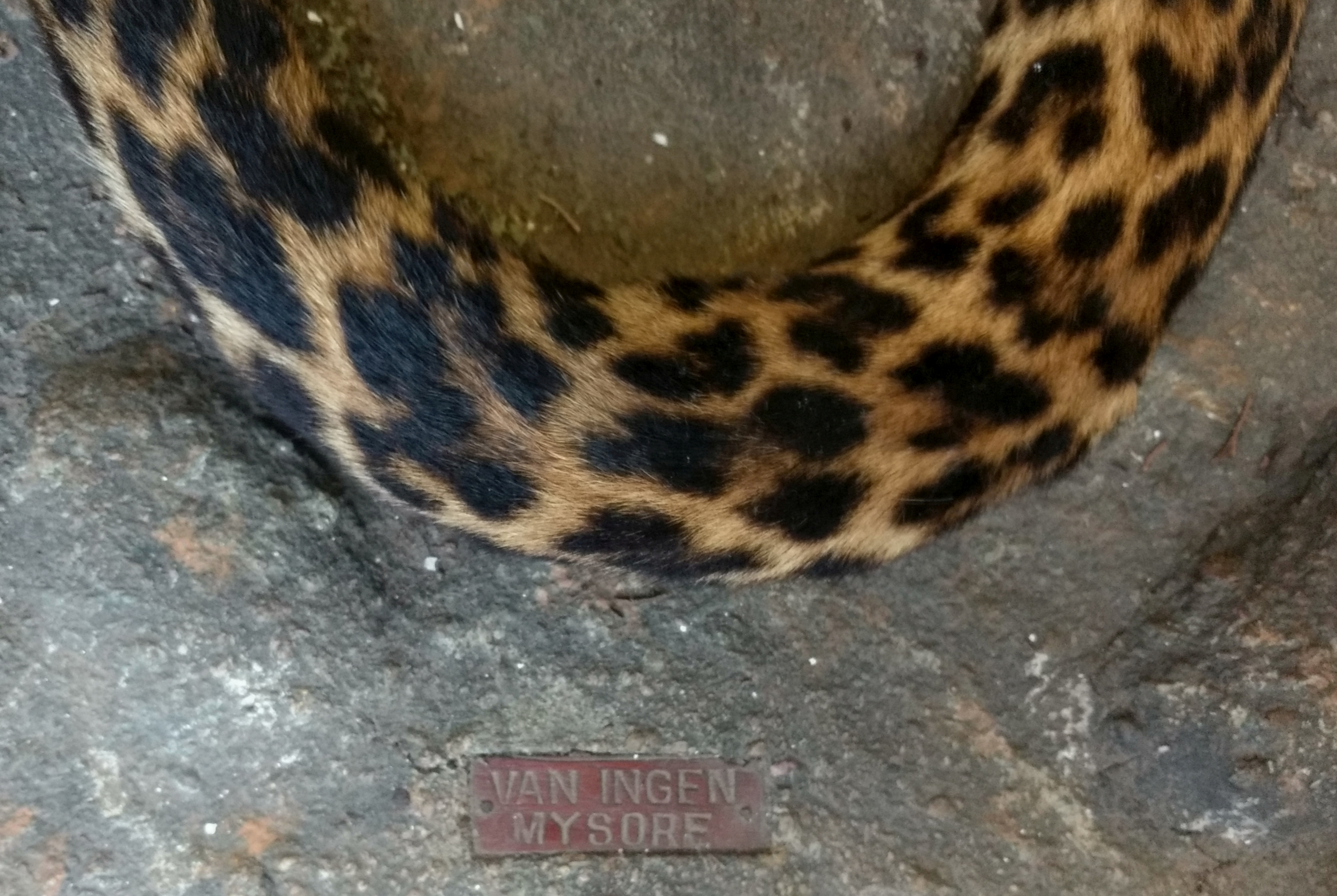
Label of a Van Ingen mount

Today, Van Ingen taxidermy mounts are found in private collections and museums throughout the world. Some can be found in auction houses throughout Britain at times finding fetching high prices.

Today there is little to no information regarding possibly one of the greatest taxidermy firms in the world, apart from P.A. Morris' studies. The Van Ingen factory in Mysuru, India lies derelict overgrown by the local jungle. The last member of the Van Ingens family Edwin Joubert Van Ingen (born 27 July 1912) died on 12 Mar 2013 in his Mysore residence. He was 101 years old.

Stuffed animals by Van Ingen & Van Ingen were part of the museum collection that was destroyed in the April 2016 fire at the National Museum of Natural History, New Delhi.

== See also ==
- Trophy hunting
