= Karanji Lake =

Lake in Mysore, Karnataka, India

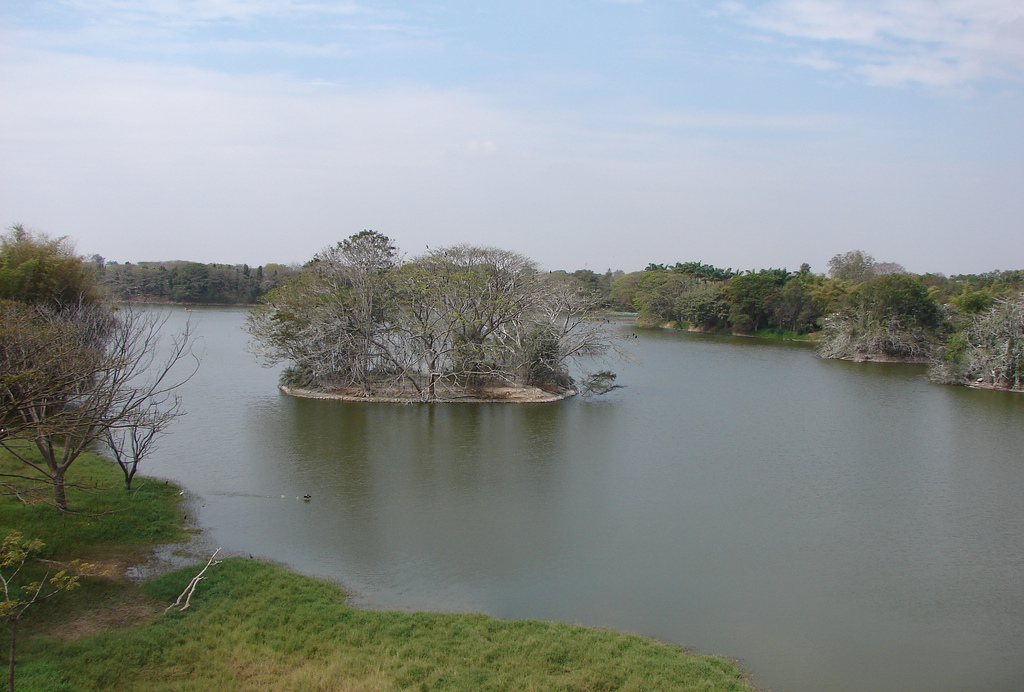

- Location within Karnataka
- Location: Mysore, Karnataka
- Coordinates: 12°18′10″N 76°40′25″E
- Basin countries: India

Karanji Lake (also known as Fountain Lake) is a lake located in the city of Mysore in the state of Karnataka, India. The lake is surrounded by a nature park consisting of a butterfly park and a walk-through aviary. This aviary is the biggest 'walk-through aviary' in India. There is also a museum, the Regional Museum of Natural History which is located on the banks of this lake. The total area of Karanji lake is 90 hectares. While waterspread area is about 55 hectares, the foreshore area measures about 35 hectares. Karanji lake is owned by the Mysore Zoo Authority. Mysore Zoo gets a revenue of an average of Rs. 50000 per day from ticket sales to enthusiasts who visit this lake.

== History ==
Karanji Lake was one of the favourite haunts of migratory birds like herons and egrets. But the lake started getting polluted when sewage from the nearby residential areas were let into the lake. This pollution led to the destruction of aquatic life in the lake and with the food-source getting depleted, the migratory birds started to avoid the lake.

=== Restoration ===
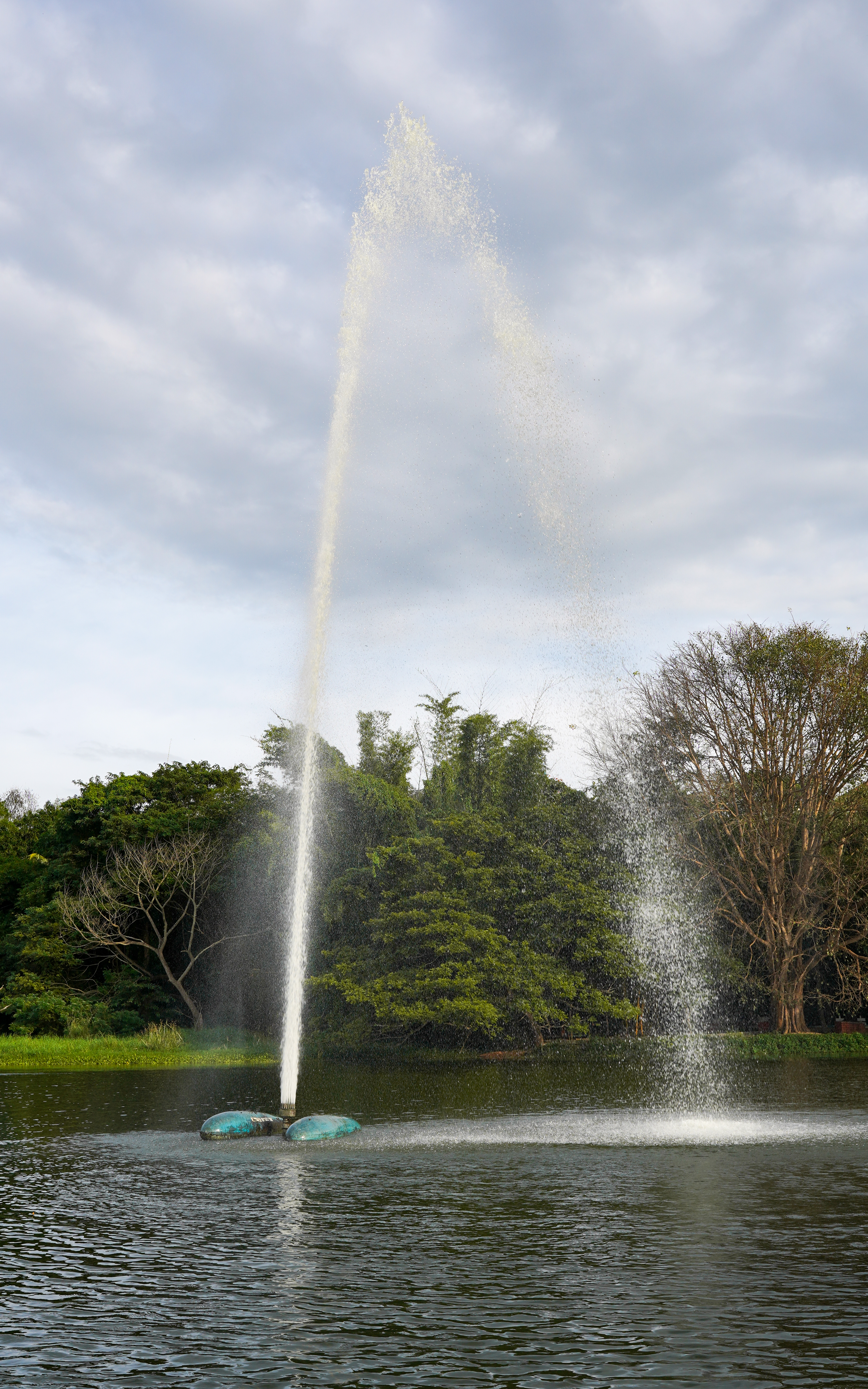
Fountain in the lake

In order to prevent the destruction of this lake and to renovate it, help was sought from the Asian Development Bank (ADB), Karnataka Urban Infrastructure Development Finance Corporation (KUIDFC) and Zoo Authority of Karnataka (ZAK). These three organisations came together and undertook the restoration activities of this lake. Financial help of Rs. 12 million was provided by ADB and ZAK undertook the restoration work with the co-ordination of KUIDFC.

The first step undertaken was to stop the sewage from entering the lake. Other restoration activities included removal of polluted silt, de-weeding of the entire lake surface, removing 30 cm of silt from the lake, restoration of feeder channels, construction of a jetty to start boating facility, and the construction of a bridge to the newly created 'butterfly park'. A watch tower was also constructed to view the birds and study their behaviour. A giant fountain which can spew water up to 40 feet has been recently added as an attraction. A nursery of medicinal plants is also present here.

== Aviary ==
The aviary constructed on the shore of the lake has a height of 20 m, length of 60 m and width of 40 m making it India's biggest walk-through aviary. The aviary was set up at a cost of Rs 3.8 million. It includes an artificial water fall and two small water bodies. Water from the Karanji lake is pumped inside the aviary in the form of a stream while the used water is discharged into the lake. It has about 40–50 birds of 17 species. Hornbills, peacocks, white-peacocks, turkeys and black swans are some of the birds found in this aviary. This aviary was temporarily closed in the year 2006 to prevent the break-out of bird flu.

== Birds ==
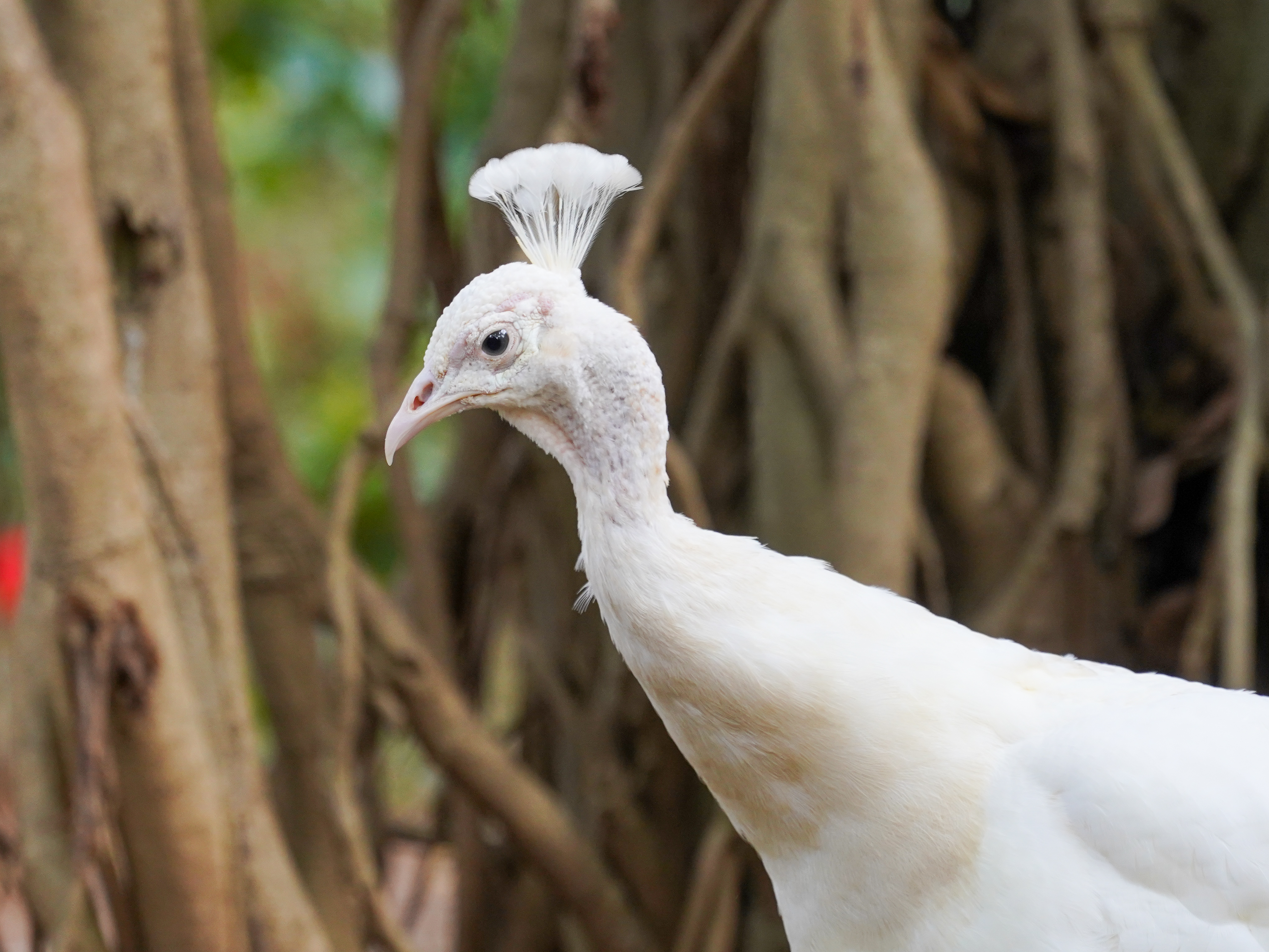
White peacock (Pavos cristatus mut. alba)

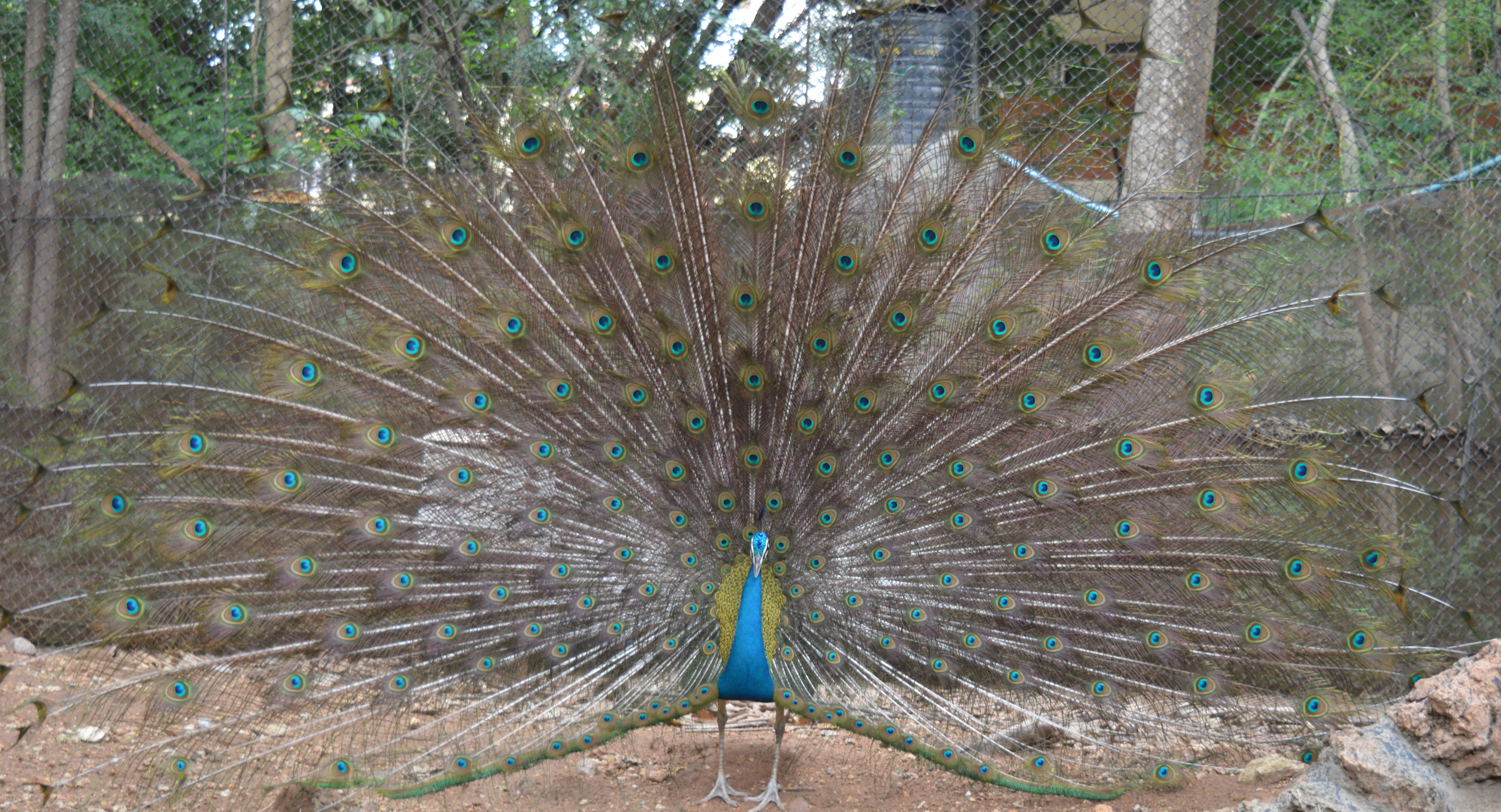
Peacock at Karanji

Some of the common migratory birds found here are grey pelican, painted stork, ibis, cormorant, egret, etc. which nest on trees in the islands present in the lake. Recent survey of birds have indicated 147 species. Indian peacocks and peahens are the most common birds present here, given that it is the National bird of India. Herons, Asian open bill storks, egrets, red wattle lapwing, sandpipers, rose ringed parakeet, black drongo, brown shrike, red-whiskered bulbul, booted warbler, sunbird and greenish warbler are some of the other species of birds found here.

== Butterfly park ==
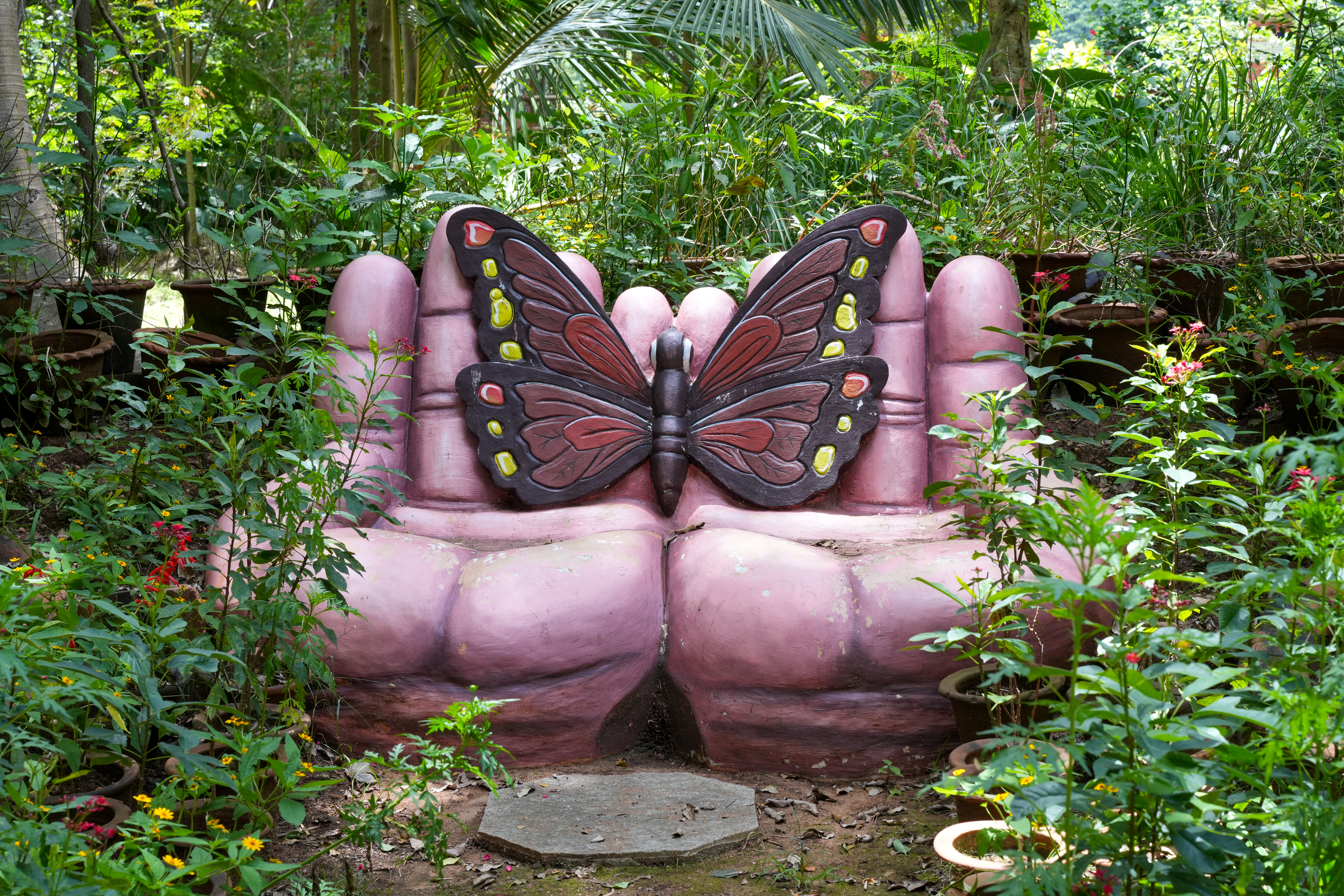
Decorative bench in the Butterfly Park

The butterfly park has been created on a small island within the Karanji lake. About 45 species of butterflies have been identified here. With the help of a botanist, appropriate species of host plants and nectar plants essential for the breeding of butterflies were selected and planted within the island. These plants have also been brought from hillstations and other regions like Malnad.

== Regional Museum of Natural History (RMNH) ==
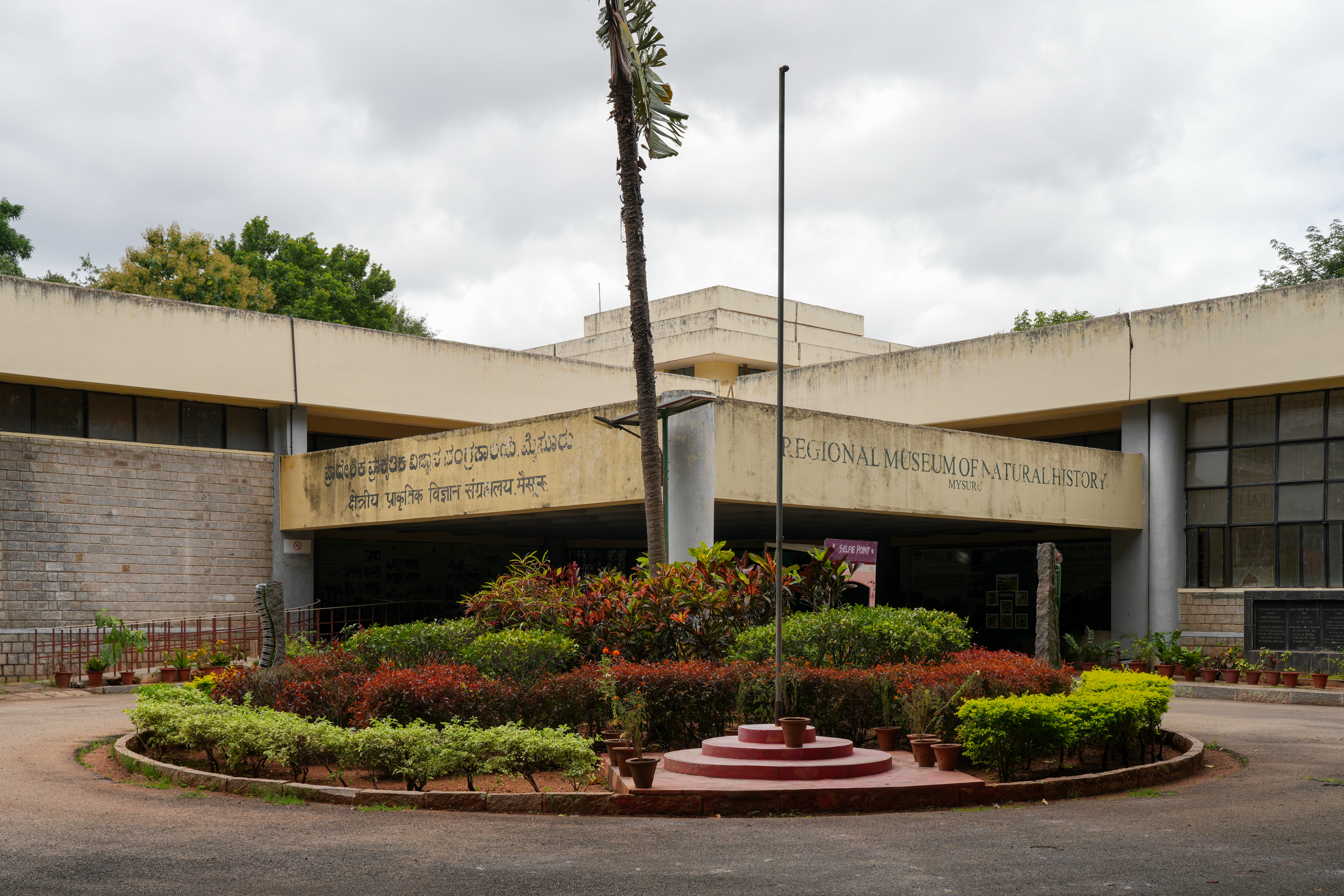
Main building, RMNH

The Regional Museum of Natural History was inaugurated on 20 May 1995. The broad objectives of the Museum are:

- Depict floral, faunal and geological wealth of the southern region of India.
- Depict ecological interrelationship among plants and animals with emphasis on conservation of Nature and Natural Resources
- Provide facility for school children on curriculum-based studies in biology and geology with emphasis on environmental aspect.
- Develop programs for masses to create environmental awareness

== See also ==
- Mysore City lakes
- Mysore East

== Image gallery ==
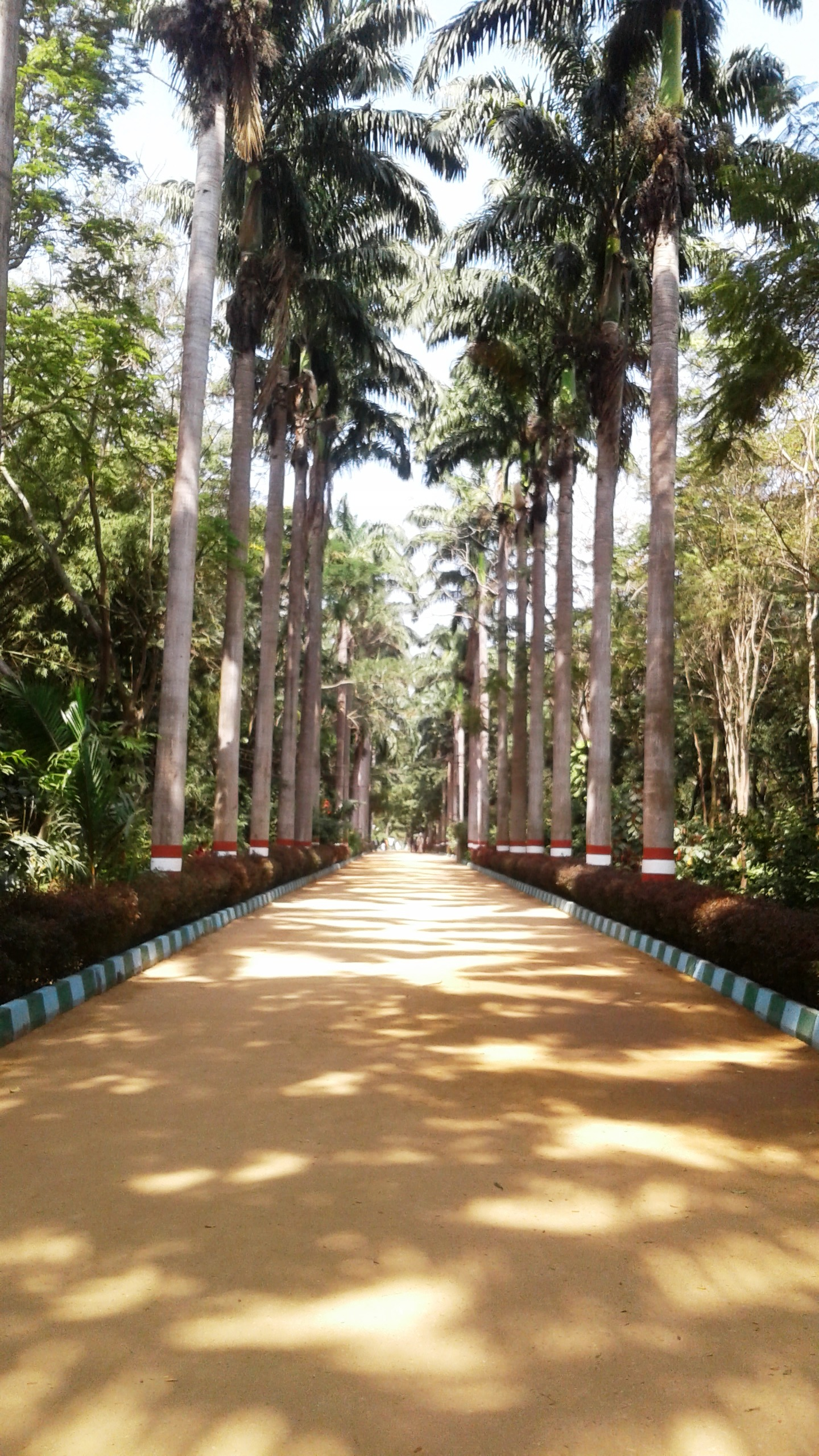
One of the paths in the park

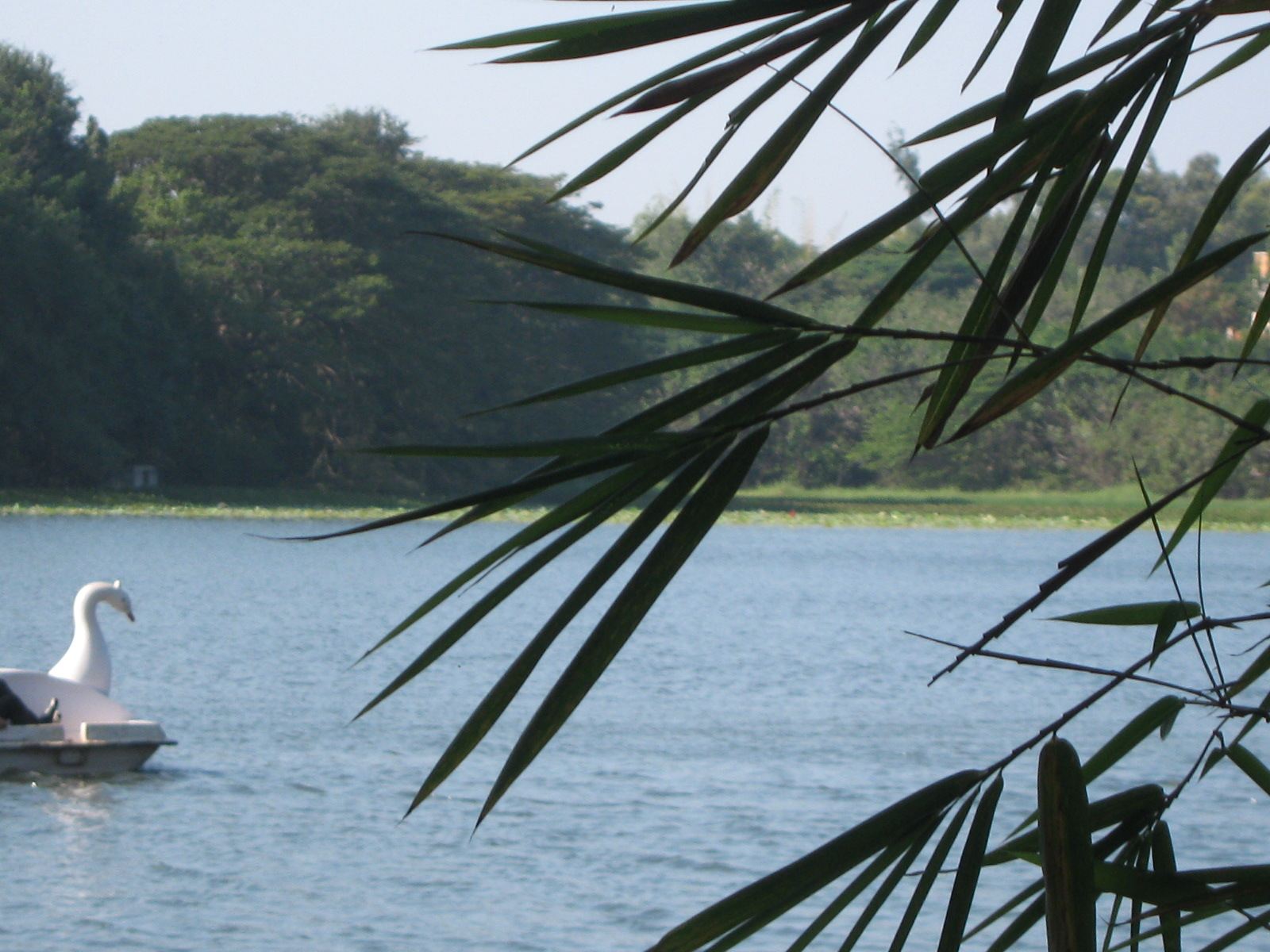
Karanji Lake

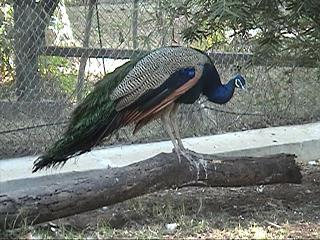
Peacock in the aviary at Karanji lake

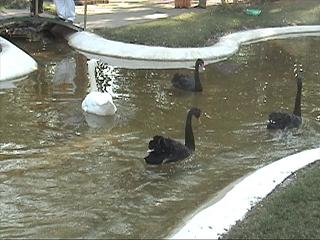
Swans in the aviary at Karanji lake
