= Mysore Zoo =

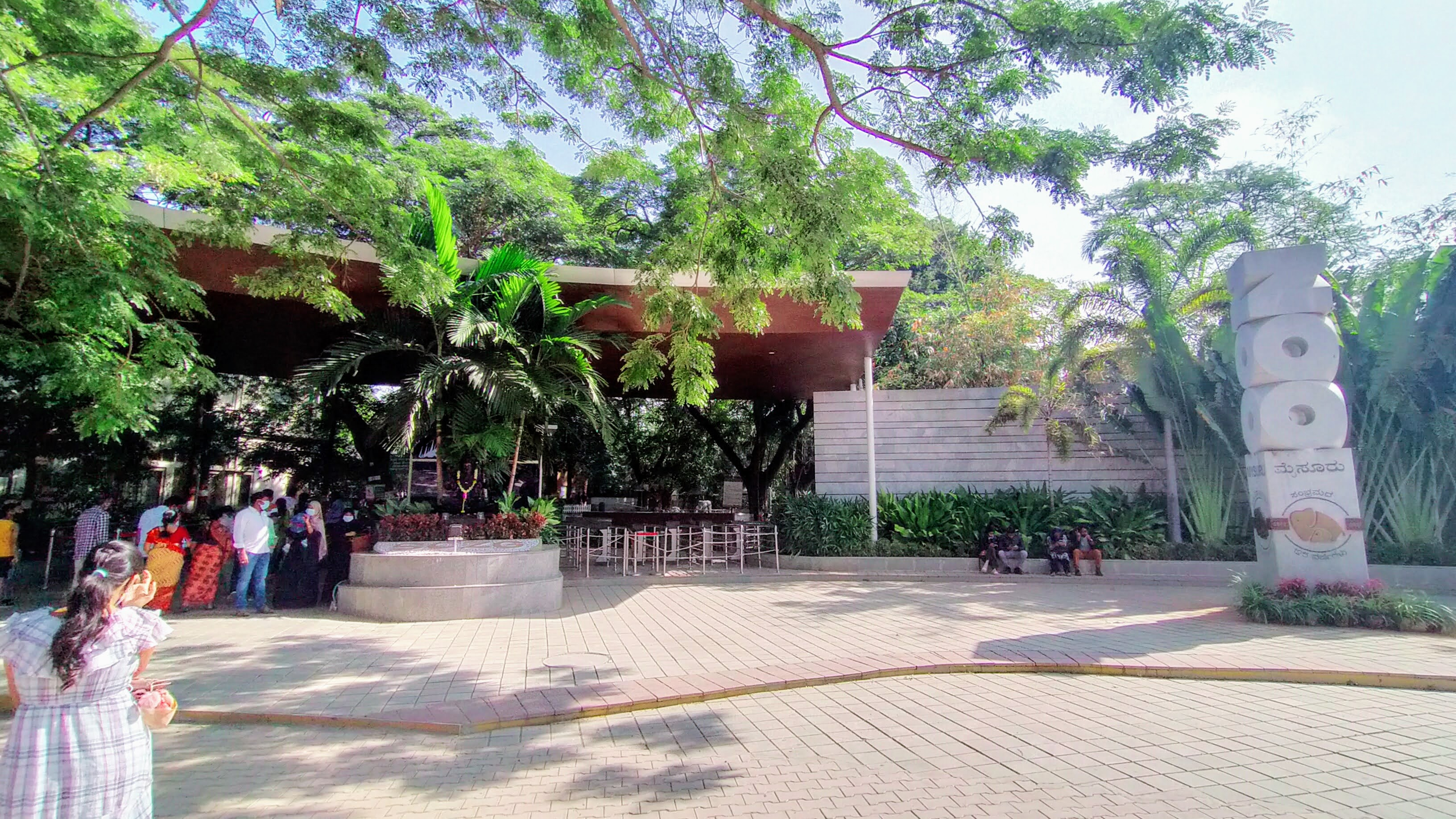
- Entrance of Mysore Zoo
- Interactive map of Mysore Zoo
- 12.3008°N 76.6677°E
- Date opened: 1892
- Location: Mysore, India
- Land area: 157 acres (64 ha) + 113 acres (46 ha)
- No. of animals: 1320
- Memberships: CZA / WAZA/ ZAK
- Website: www.mysuruzoo.info

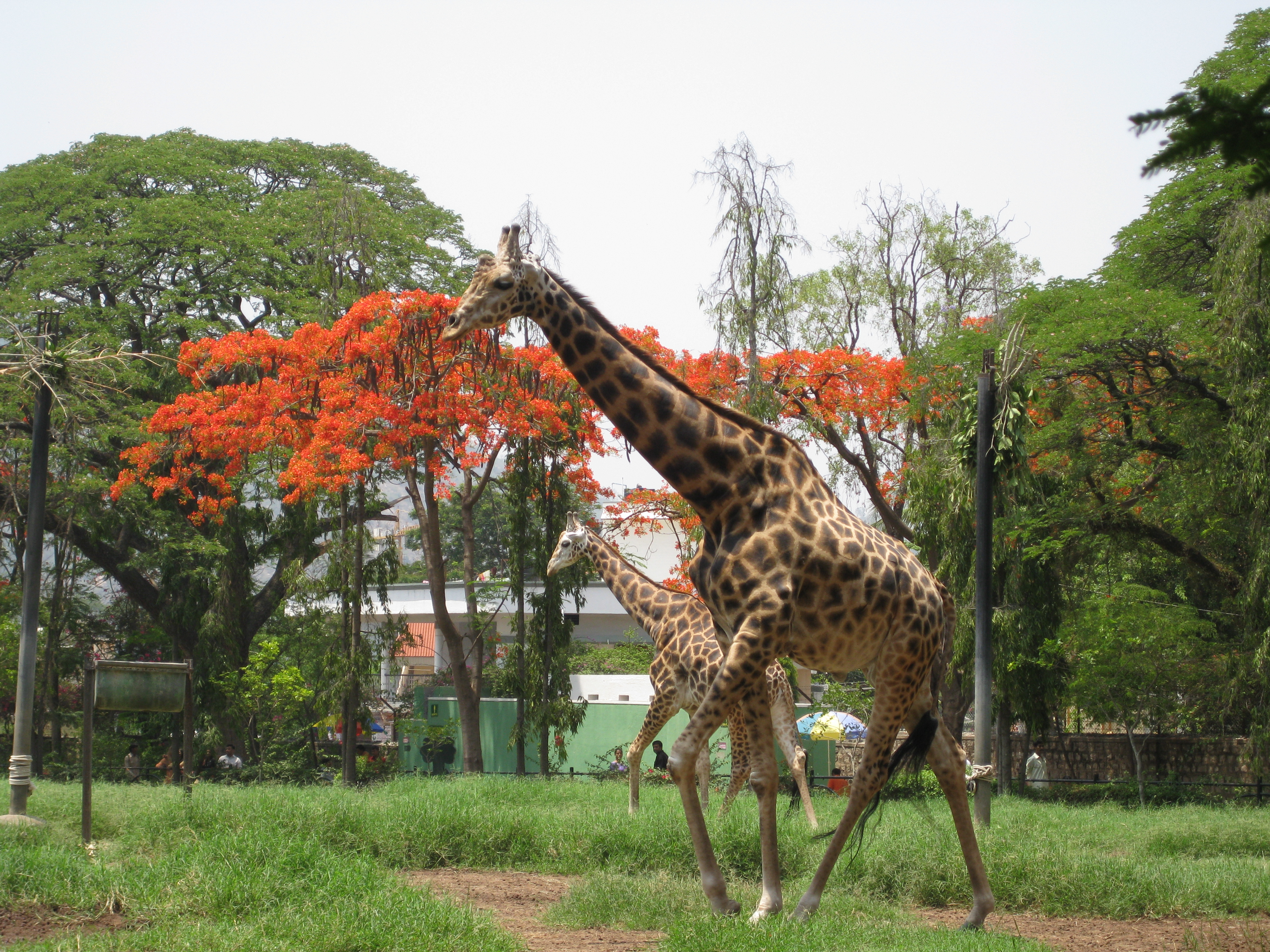
Giraffes at the zoo

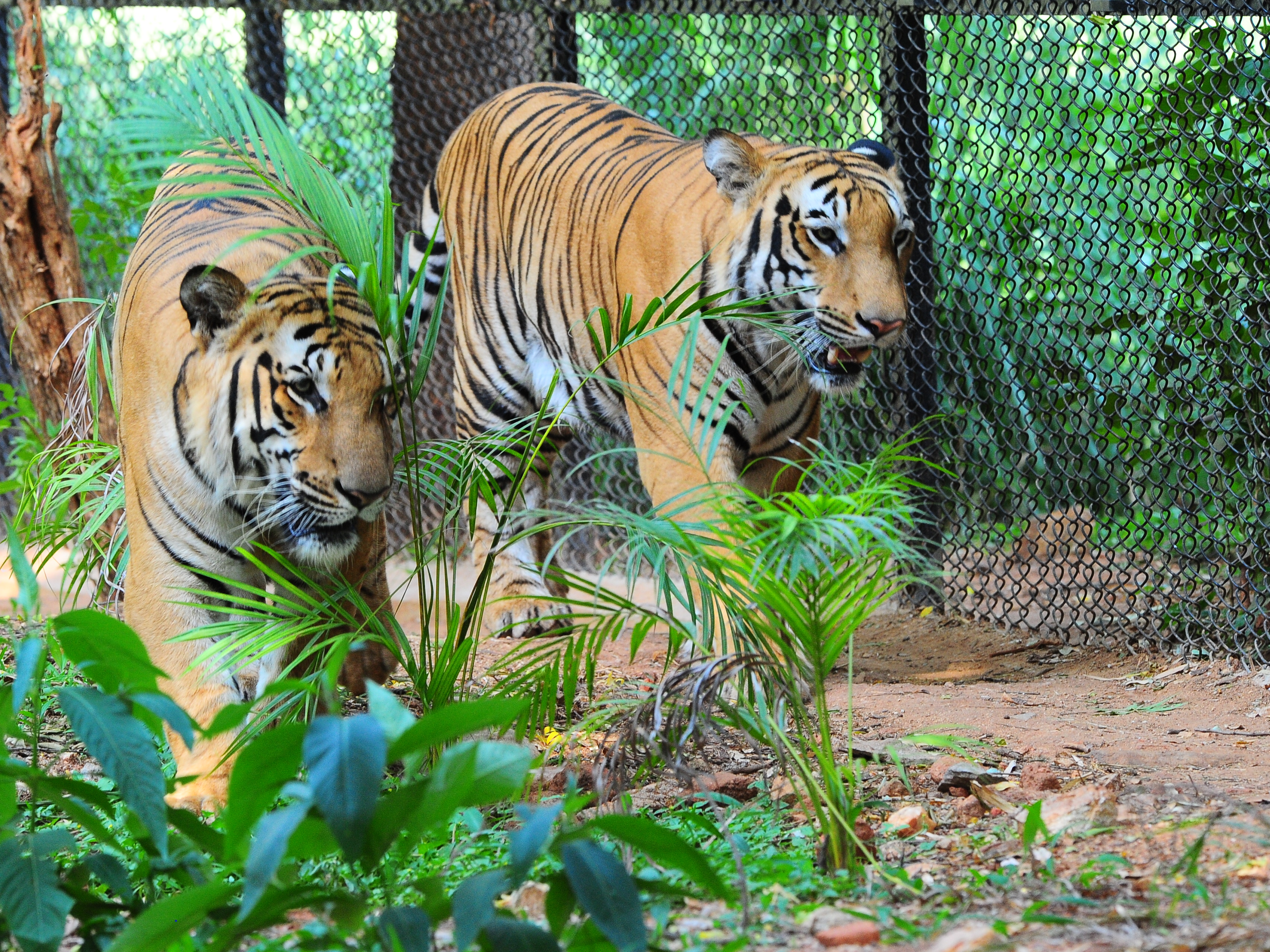
Two Bengal Tigers in an enclosure

Mysore Zoo (or Mysuru Zoo), officially known as Sri Chamarajendra Zoological Gardens, is a composite of zoological gardens and animal park located in the southern Indian city of Mysore, Karnataka. Stretching across a 157-acre (64 ha)-expanse and situated at about 700 metres (0.43 miles) from Mysore Palace, it is the oldest zoo in India and one of the oldest in the world. One of the most popular zoos in India and one of the city's most popular attractions, it is home to a wide range of over 168 species.

== History ==
Mysore Zoo was created from the private menagerie of Chamaraja Wadiyar X, the twenty-third Maharaja of Mysore. in 1892, on 10 acres (4.0 ha) of the Summer Palace. Over the next 10 years, the zoo was expanded to 45 acres (18 ha) with spacious enclosures that are still in use.

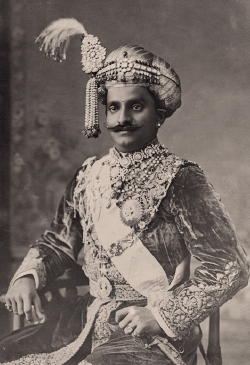
Chamaraja Wadiyar X, the founder of the zoological gardens

Originally called the Palace Zoo, it was renamed "Chamarajendra Zoological Gardens" in 1909. A.C. Hughes, from South Wales, was the zoo's first superintendent, serving from 1892 to 1924. Hughes, Sir Mirza Ismail, and G.H. Krumbiegel worked towards refashioning the zoo and updating it with modern, natural enclosures. It now features a bandstand and an artificial lake.

In 1948, management of the zoo was devolved to the Department of Parks and Gardens, Government of Mysore. The zoo was expanded first with another 50 acres (20 ha), and then another 150 acres (61 ha) with the acquisition of the Karanji Tank, in which an artificial island has been created as a sanctuary for birds. In 1972, the zoo was entrusted the Forest Department and later in 1979 to the Zoo Authority of Karnataka, the first autonomous organisation in India to manage a zoo.

The zoo had completed 100 years in 1992. The centenary celebrations were held in 1990 and 91. During the centenary celebrations various developmental activities were initiated such as renovation and modification of the entrance gate, hospital building, walkthrough reptiles, etc. A bust of Chamaraja Wadiyar X was unveiled. The logo of the zoo, centenary souvenir, publication of literature and leaflets, conducting various competitions, preparation of a documentary film were other highlights.

== Objectives ==
The objectives of Mysore Zoo are as under:

- Conservation education
- Conservation breeding
- Research, documentation and study
- Rescue and rehabilitation of the wild animals and birds
- Recreation and education for general visitors, tourist & locals

== Management and lands holdings ==
While mainly depending on entry fees for its financing, an adoption scheme introduced in the early 2000s has been a success. Celebrities, institutions, animal lovers and volunteers of various clubs in the zoo have contributed directly to the welfare of the zoo inhabitants.

=== Lands under the control of Mysore Zoo ===
- Sri Chamarajendra Zoological Gardens, Mysore.
- Karanji Lake Nature Park, Mysore.
- Chamundi Conservation and Rehabilitation Center, Kurugahalli, Mysore.

== Karanji Lake ==
The Karanji Lake which covers 77.02 acres (31.17 ha) is located on the eastern side of the zoo. The Chamundi Hills acts as catchment and provides a dramatic backdrop.

Previously the tank was almost a garbage dump being used by all and sundry for each and every function. There was no bird life but for scavengers, crows, and the entire area was a slum. As such it was in constant danger of being taken over by developers for real estate development. The tank was handed to Mysore Zoo in March 1976 by public works department for development and maintenance. The tank is situated on north-east side of Mysore city. It functions as a percolation tank. After the protection and afforestation in the foreshore area, the tank started attracting a variety of birds for breeding & nesting activities. Restoration and development activities were taken up under the Asian Development Bank project through Karnataka Urban Infrastructure Development Finance Corporation to the extent of Rs.1.17 crores.

About 5 acres (2.0 ha) of prime zoo land has been donated to the Natural History Museum, which will enhance the educational potential of the zoo by offering people a rare opportunity to study natural history of wild animals, aquatic birds and tropical vegetation, etc.

== Animals ==
The zoo is currently home to ten elephants, and has more elephants than any other zoo in India. A total of 34 elephants have lived at this zoo, many of which were eventually transferred to other zoos in Mysore. The zoo also has five green anacondas, contributed by Colombo Zoo. It is also the only zoo in India to house chimpanzees, gorillas, orangutans, white rhinos and cheetahs.

Some of the animals housed in the Mysore Zoo include:

=== List of animals ===
Birds

- Bar-headed goose
- Barn owl
- Black-crowned night heron
- Black-necked swan
- Blue-and-yellow macaw
- Brahminy kite
- Brown wood owl
- Budgerigar
- Chinese ring-necked pheasant
- Comb duck
- Common ostrich
- Darwin's rhea
- Eclectus parrot
- Eurasian spoonbill
- Goffin's cockatoo
- Golden pheasant
- Great hornbill
- Great white pelican
- Green pheasant
- Grey junglefowl
- Grey parrot
- Indian peafowl
- Jandaya conure
- Lady Amherst's pheasant
- Lesser adjutant
- Livingstone's turaco
- Military macaw
- Mottled wood owl
- Painted stork
- Plum-headed parakeet
- Rainbow lorikeet
- Red-and-green macaw
- Red lory
- Ruddy shelduck
- Sarus crane
- Scarlet ibis
- Scarlet macaw
- Silver pheasant
- Spot-billed pelican
- Sulphur-crested cockatoo
- Sun conure
- Tawny eagle
- White-throated toucan

Mammals

- African buffalo
- African bush elephant
- Asian elephant
- Asian palm civet
- Asiatic lion
- Barasingha
- Bengal fox
- Bengal tiger
- Blackbuck
- Bornean orangutan
- Cheetah
- Chimpanzee
- Common marmoset
- Dhole
- Four-horned antelope
- Gaur
- Giraffe
- Golden jackal
- Grant's zebra
- Greater one-horned rhinoceros
- Hamadryas baboon
- Himalayan black bear
- Himalayan goral
- Hippopotamus
- Hog deer
- Indian crested porcupine
- Indian muntjac
- Indian leopard
- Indian wolf
- Jaguar
- Jungle cat
- Leopard cat
- Lion-tailed macaque
- Malabar giant squirrel
- Manipur brow-antlered deer
- Meerkat
- Nilgai
- Nilgiri langur
- Northern plains grey langur
- Red-necked wallaby
- Rhesus macaque
- Ring-tailed lemur
- Sambar deer
- Sloth bear
- Smooth-coated otter
- South American tapir
- Southern white rhinoceros
- Spotted deer
- Striped hyena
- Tufted capuchin
- Western hoolock gibbon
- Western lowland gorilla

Reptiles

- Bengal monitor
- Gharial
- Green anaconda
- Green iguana
- Green vine snake
- Indian cobra
- Indian star tortoise
- King cobra
- Malabar pit viper
- Morelet's crocodile
- Saltwater crocodile
- Siamese crocodile
- Spectacled caiman
- West African slender-snouted crocodile

Consolidated Animal Inventory Report for the Month of October 2019
Schedule I and II	Male	Female	Undetermined	Total
Mammals	124	116	38	278
Birds	16	23	8	47
Reptiles	15	15	10	40
Total	155	154	56	365
Other Schedule Species				
Mammals	93	82	44	219
Birds	99	103	72	274
Reptiles	9	10	23	42
Total	201	195	139	535
Exotic species				
Mammals	32	28	5	65
Birds	97	125	205	427
Reptiles	6	12	3	21
Total	135	165	213	513
Grand Total				
Mammals	249	226	87	562
Birds	212	251	285	748
Reptiles	30	37	36	103
Total	491	514	408	1413

== Incidents ==
The zoo witnessed a series of animal deaths in 2004 and 2005. In August 2004, a lion-tailed macaque was found mysteriously dead. An emu and a tiger were also reported to have died mysteriously. On 4 September 2004, an elephant died, reportedly of acute haemorrhagic enteritis and respiratory distress. It was reported that the illness in elephants was due to poisoning. As a safety measure, the zoo authority suspended several staff members who were allegedly responsible for the "gruesome killings". Laboratory tests later confirmed that the two elephants, named Ganesha and Roopa, had been poisoned. This was followed by another elephant death (Komala) on 7 September despite heightened security. Komala had been scheduled to be transferred to Armenia in about a month.

On 24 October 2005 another elephant, Rohan along with his mate Ansul, died with suspicions of poisoning. The elephants were supposed to be sent to Armenia as a goodwill gesture. The Chief Minister of Karnataka immediately ordered a probe into the death of Ansul and Rohan.

4 January 2017, the zoo announced that it was hit by avian influenza. Lab reports confirmed that six free-ranging and migratory birds died due to avian influenza (H5N8) in late December. The monthlong closure is the longest for the 124-year-old Mysore Zoo

== Gallery ==
Indian elephant

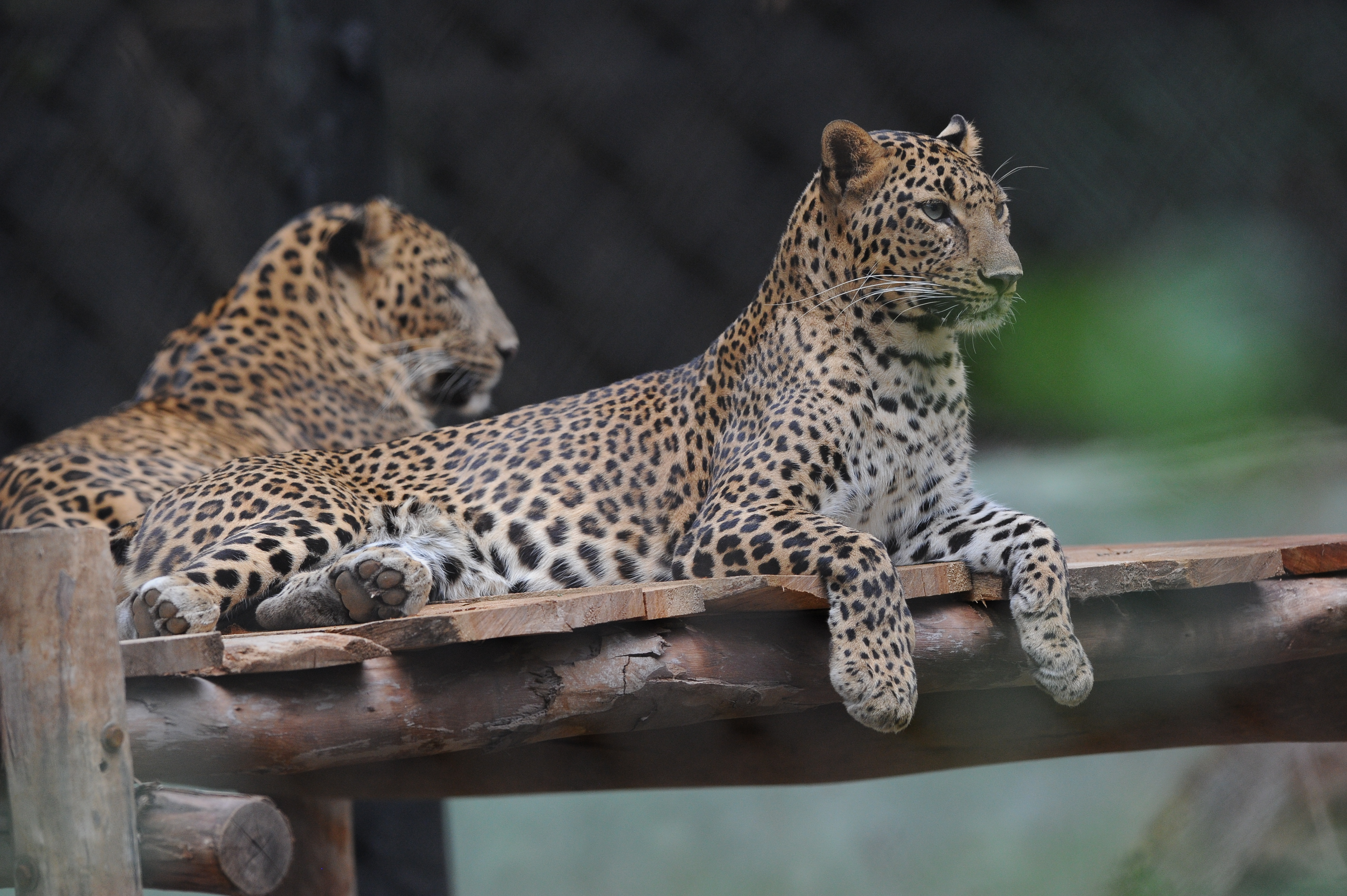
Leopard

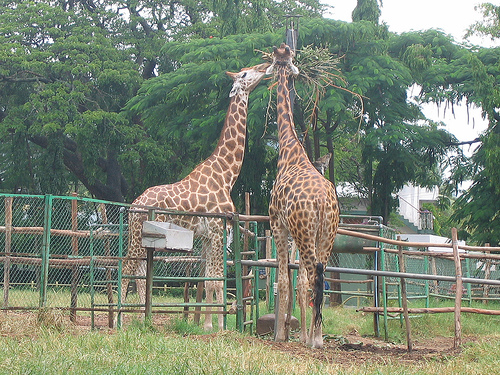
Giraffes feeding

Tiger in lush vegetation

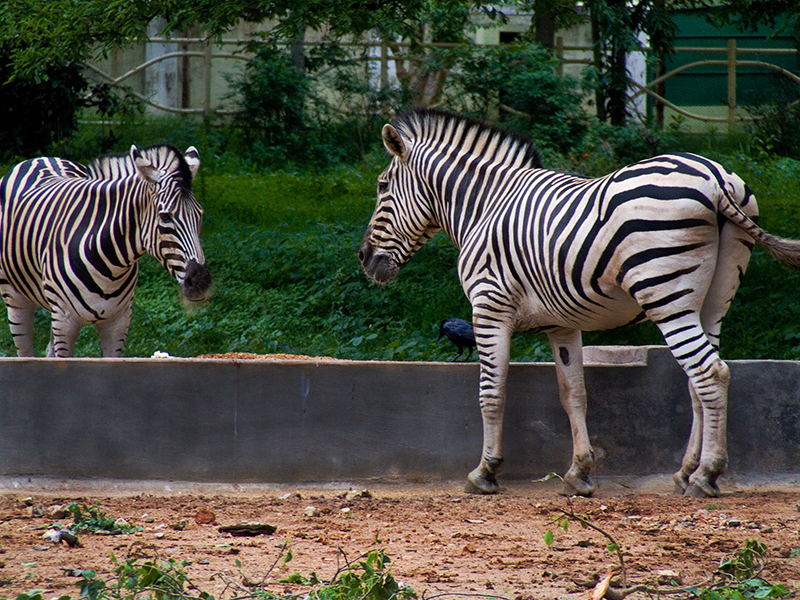
Zebras

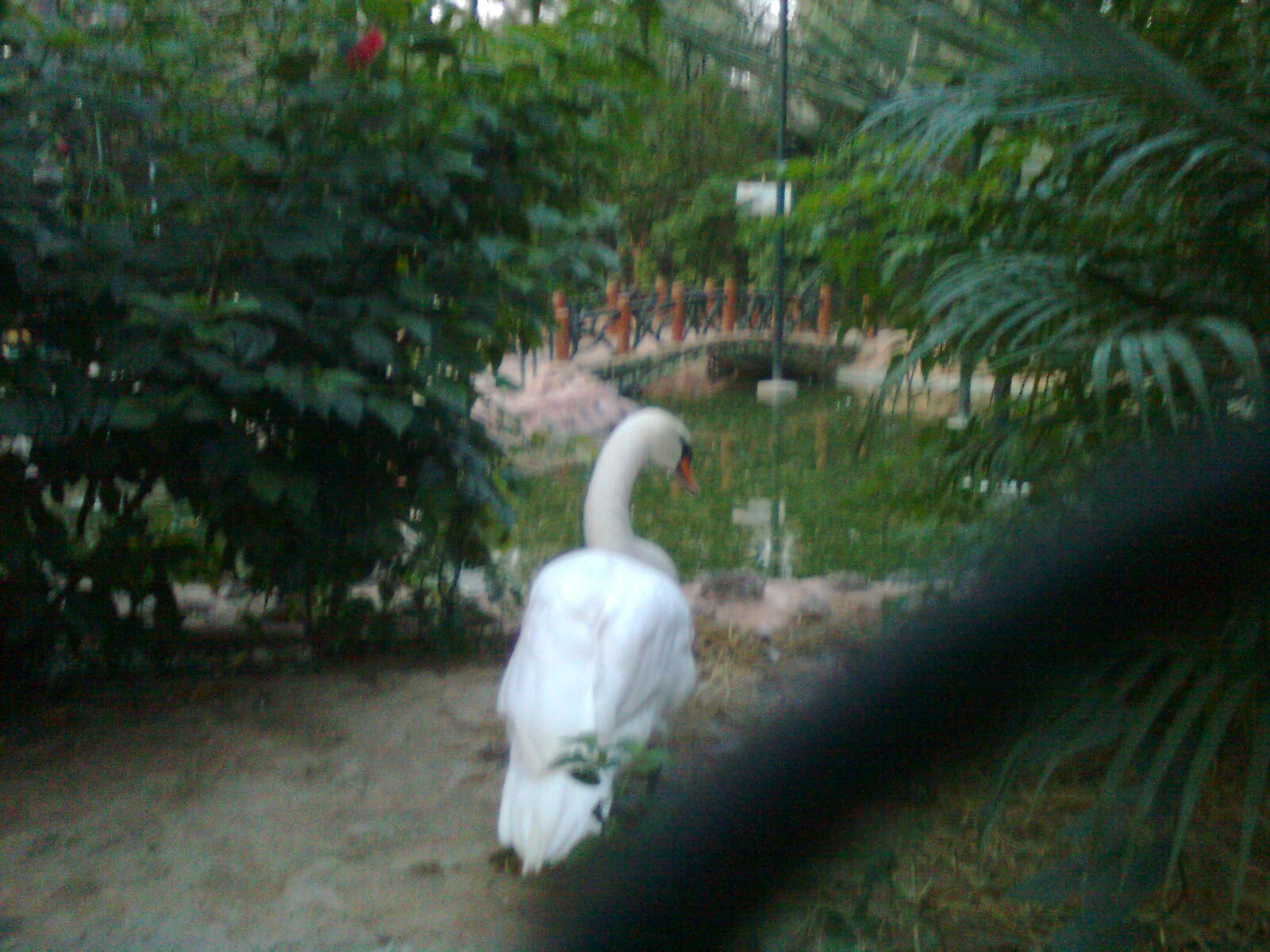
Swan

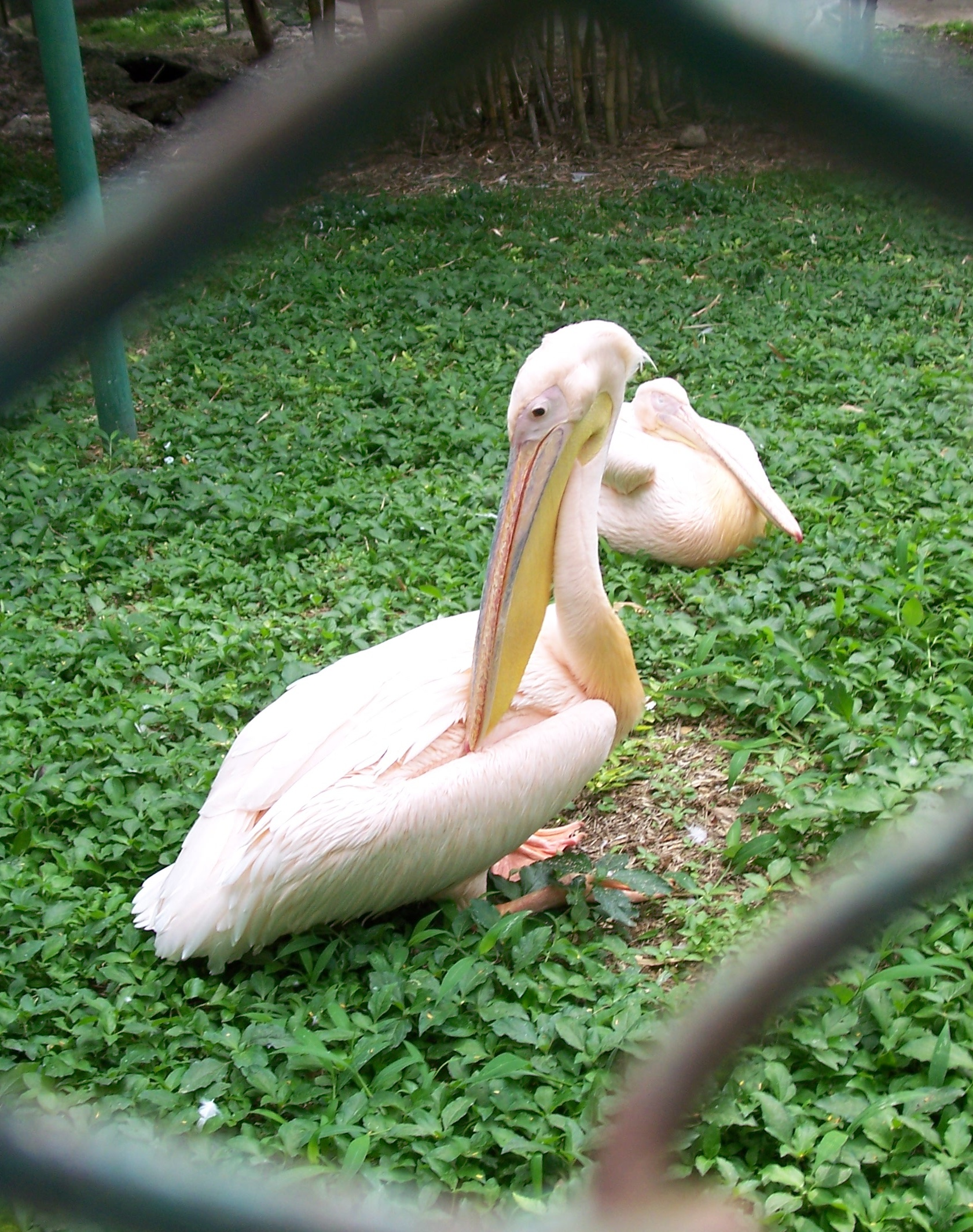
Great white pelican

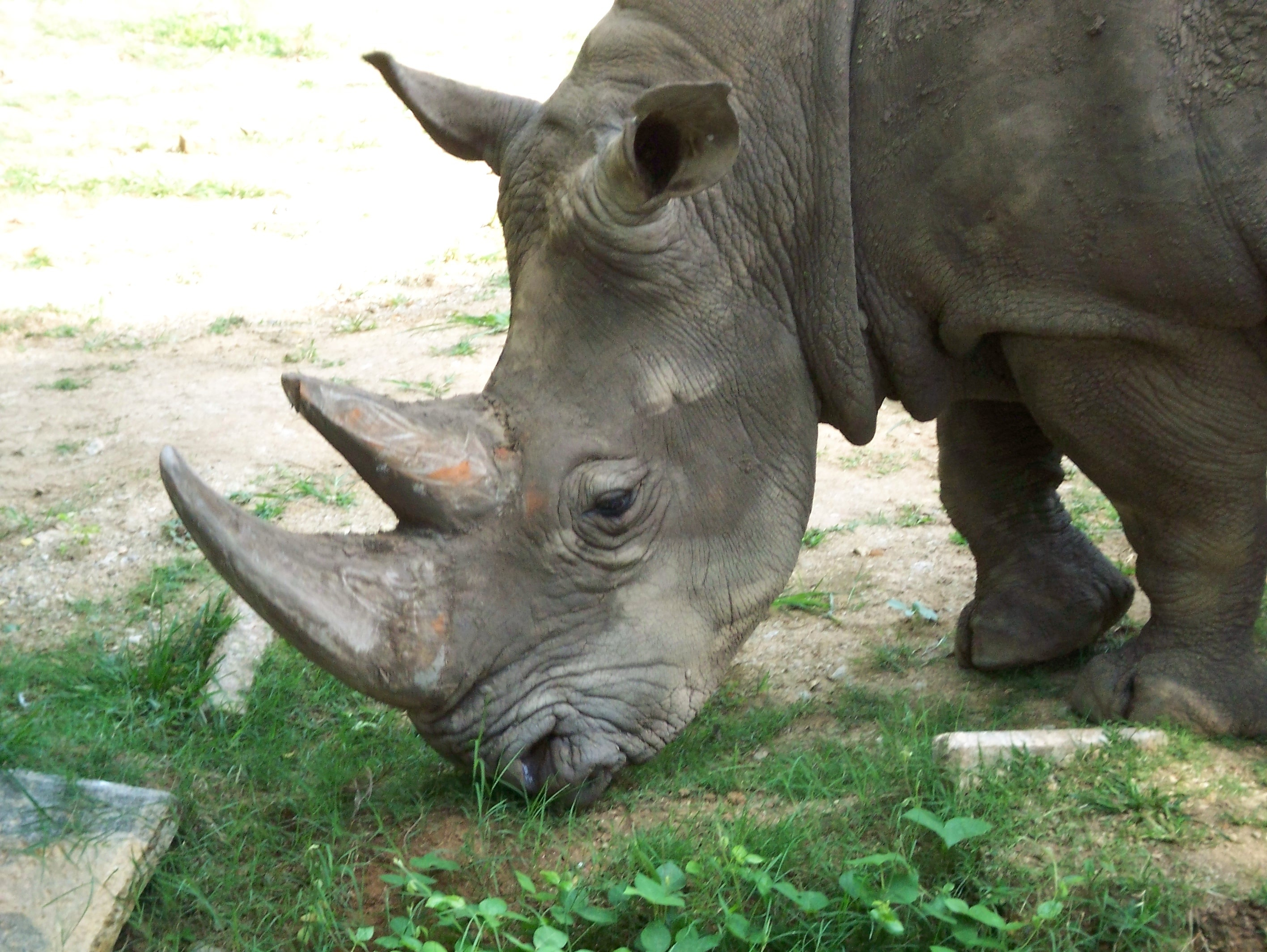
White rhinoceros

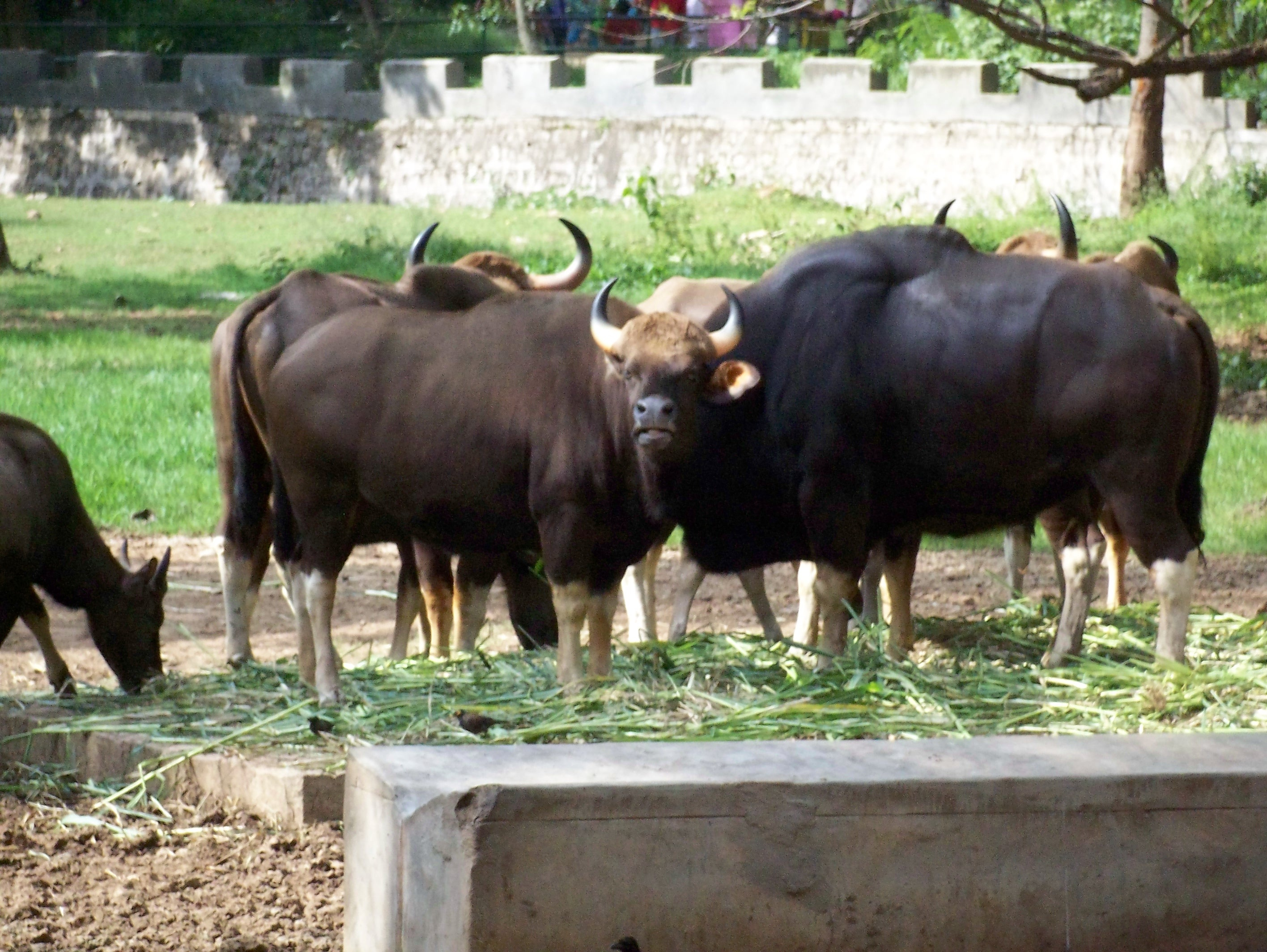
Gaur

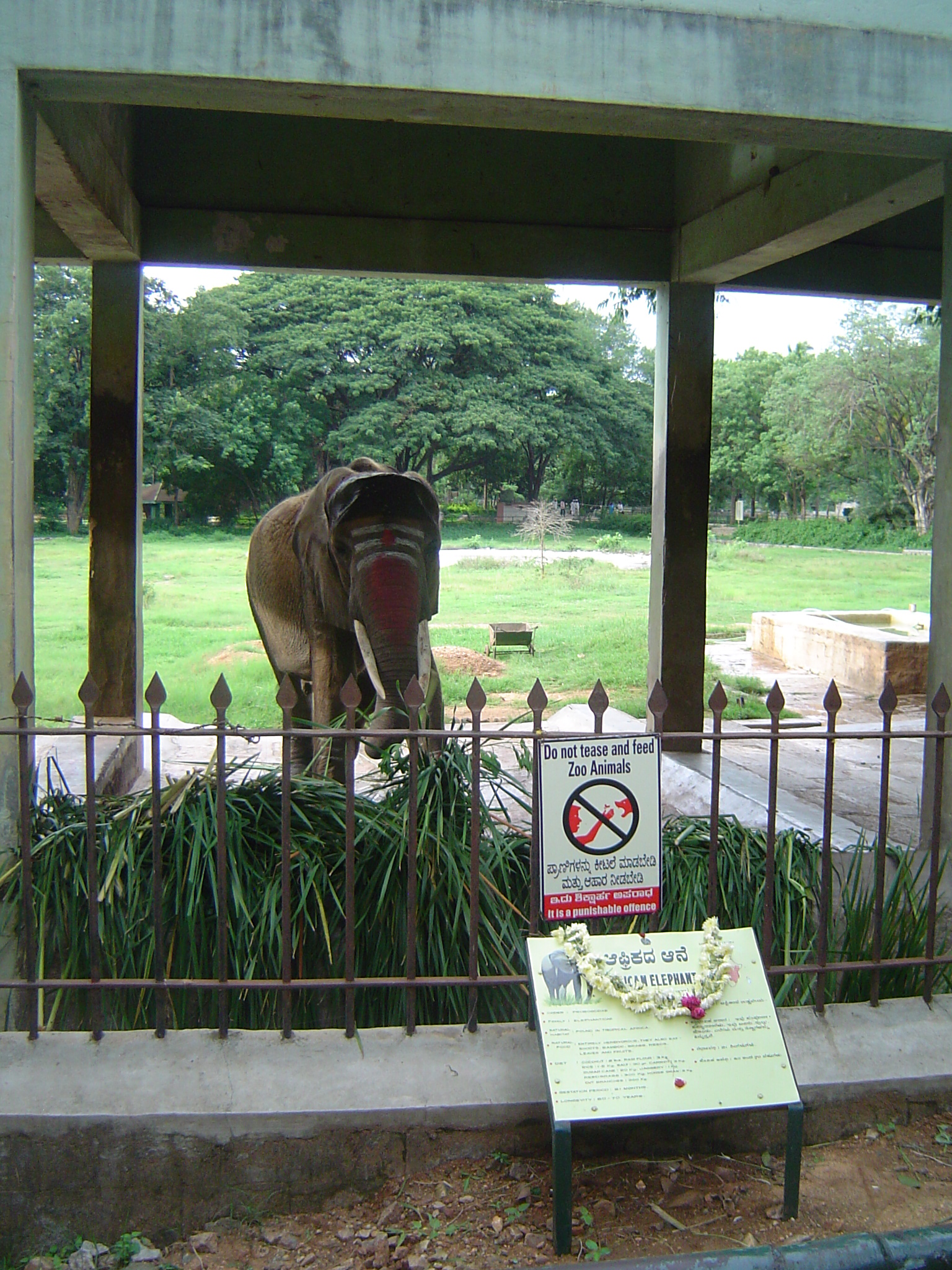
Elephant

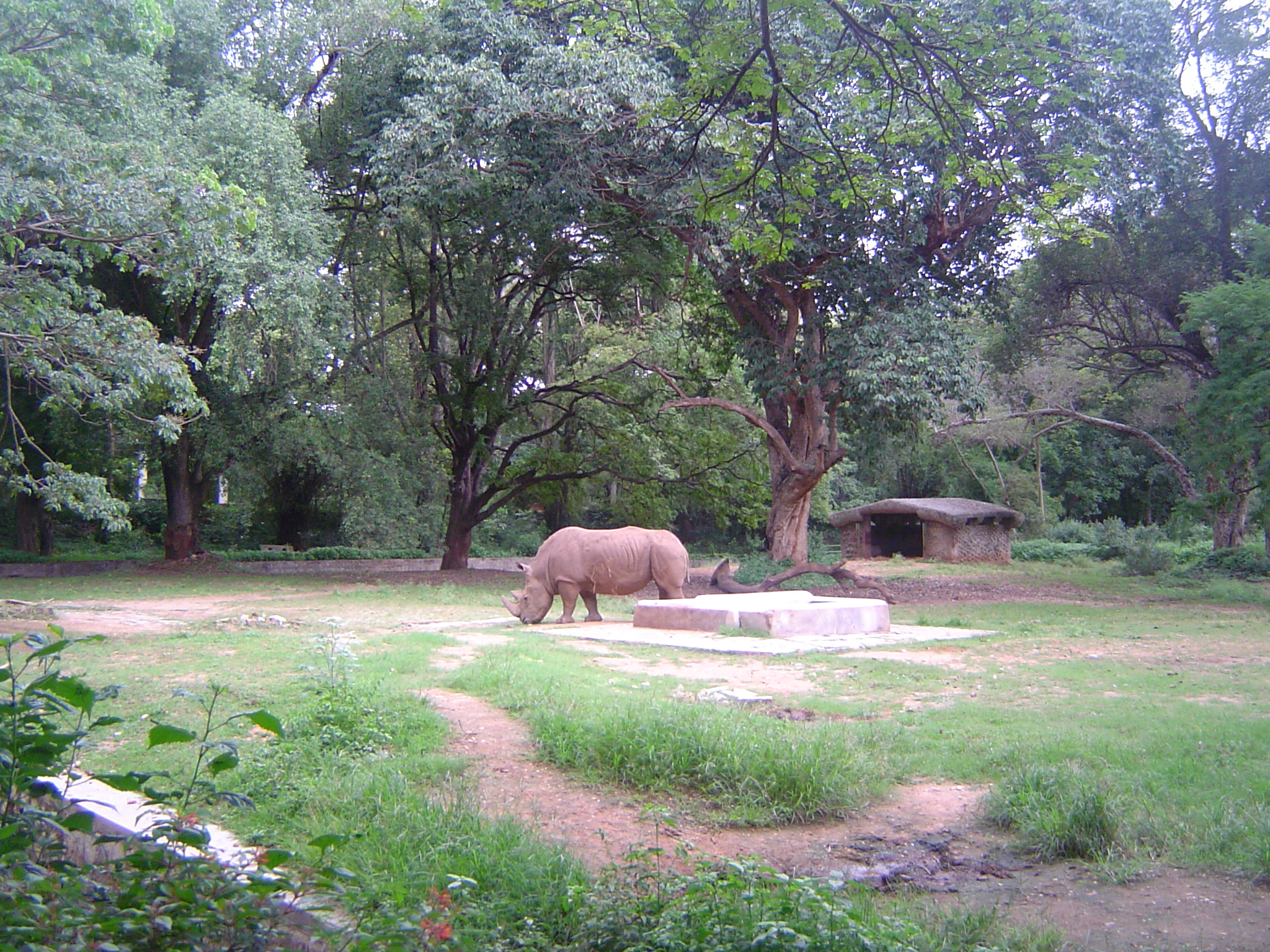
Rhino

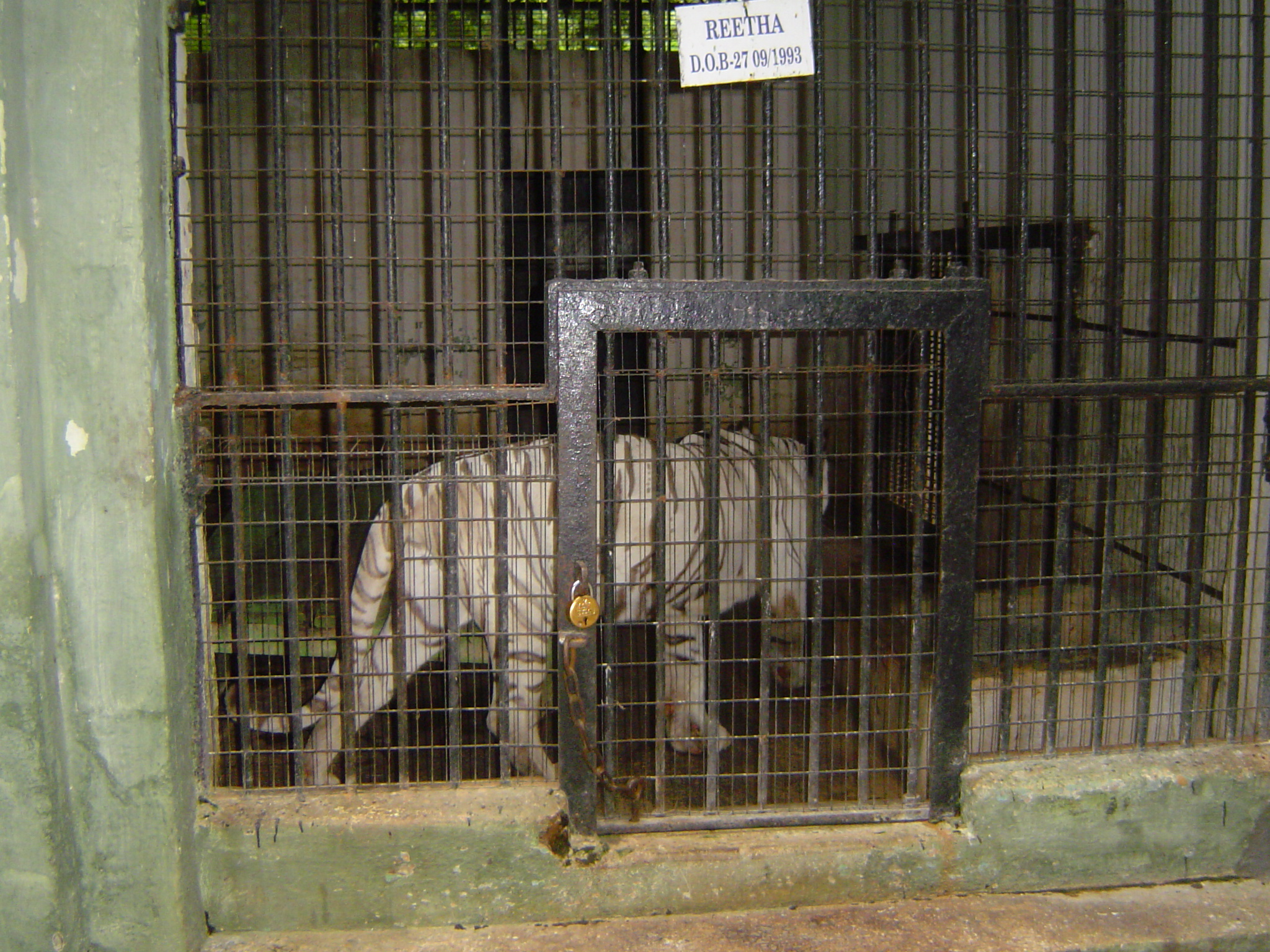
White tiger

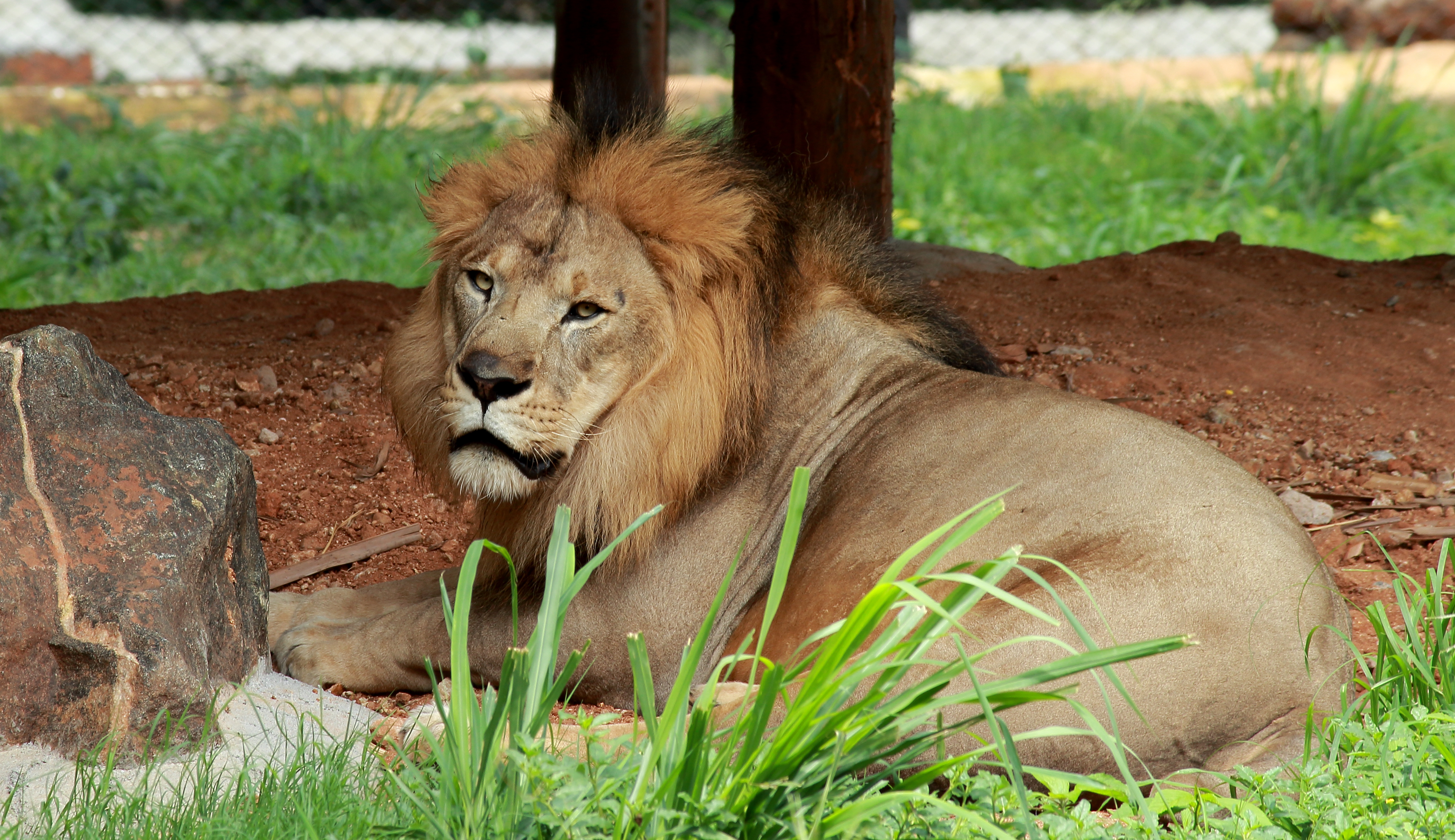
Lion

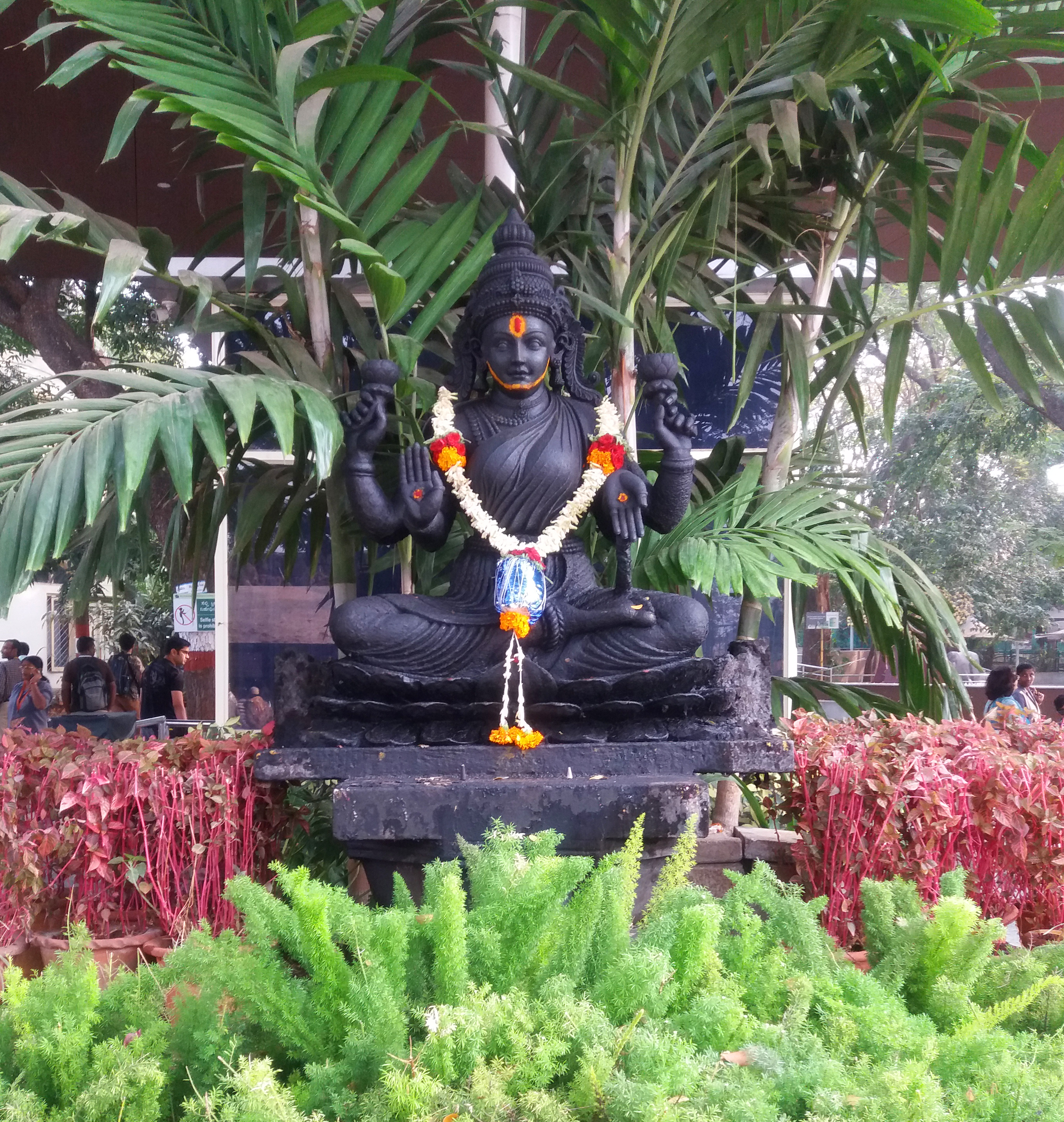
Statue located at Mysore Zoo
