= Rajiv Gandhi Regional Museum of Natural History =

- RMNH
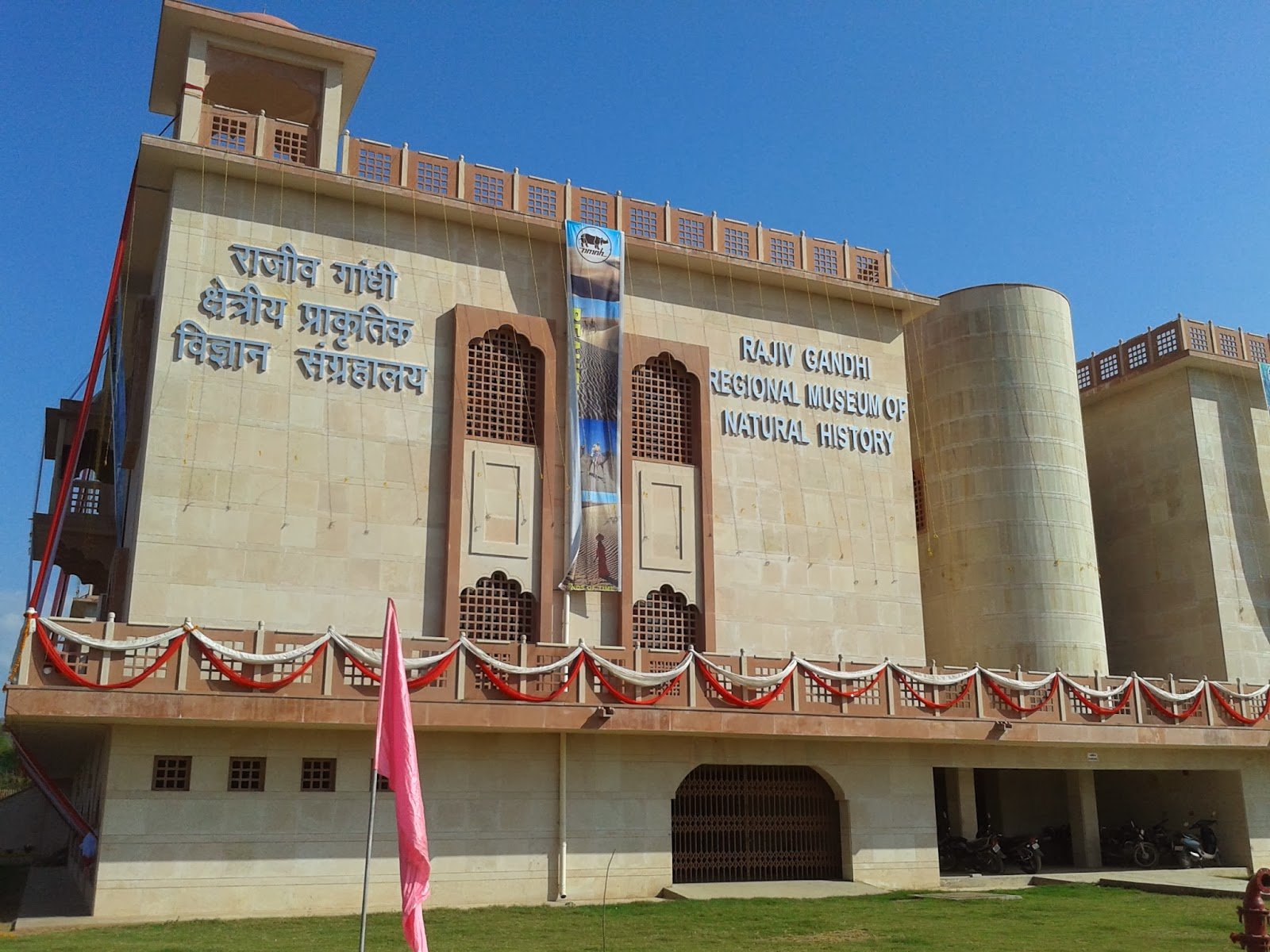
- Rajiv Gandhi Regional Museum of Natural History, Sawai Madhopur

- Location within Rajasthan
- Established: 2007
- Location: Ramsinghpura, Sawai Madhopur
- Coordinates: 26.01733°N 76.50257°E
- Type: Museum of Natural History
- Owners: Ministry of Environment and Forests, Government of India
- Website: nmnh.nic.in/SMadhopur.htm

The Regional Museum of Natural History, Sawai Madhopur or The Rajiv Gandhi Regional Museum of Natural History, Sawai Madhopur is the country's fourth regional museum of Natural History in Sawai Madhopur, India with exhibits on plants, animals and geology of the Western region of India. It is situated near Ramsinghpura village, 9 km (5.6 mi) from Sawai Madhopur in Rajasthan.

== History ==
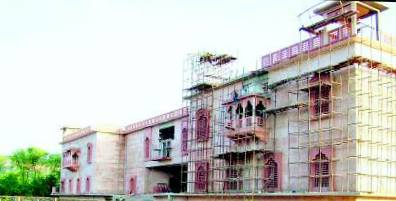
Rajiv Gandhi Regional Museum of Natural History, Sawai Madhopur

The foundation stone-laying ceremony of Rajiv Gandhi Regional Museum of Natural History, was carried out by the Vice President of India, Mohammad Hamid Ansari, on 23 December 2007, and inaugurated by the State Finance Minister, Namo Narain Meena, on 1 March 2014.

It was undertaken by the Ministry of Environment, Forests & Climate Change. The museum is spread over an area of 7.2 acres near Ramsinghpura, Ranthambore National Park, Sawai Madhopur and the headquarters of the Consultant is the National Museum of Natural History, New Delhi. This is the fourth such museum in the country after Mysore, Bhopal and Bhubaneswar.

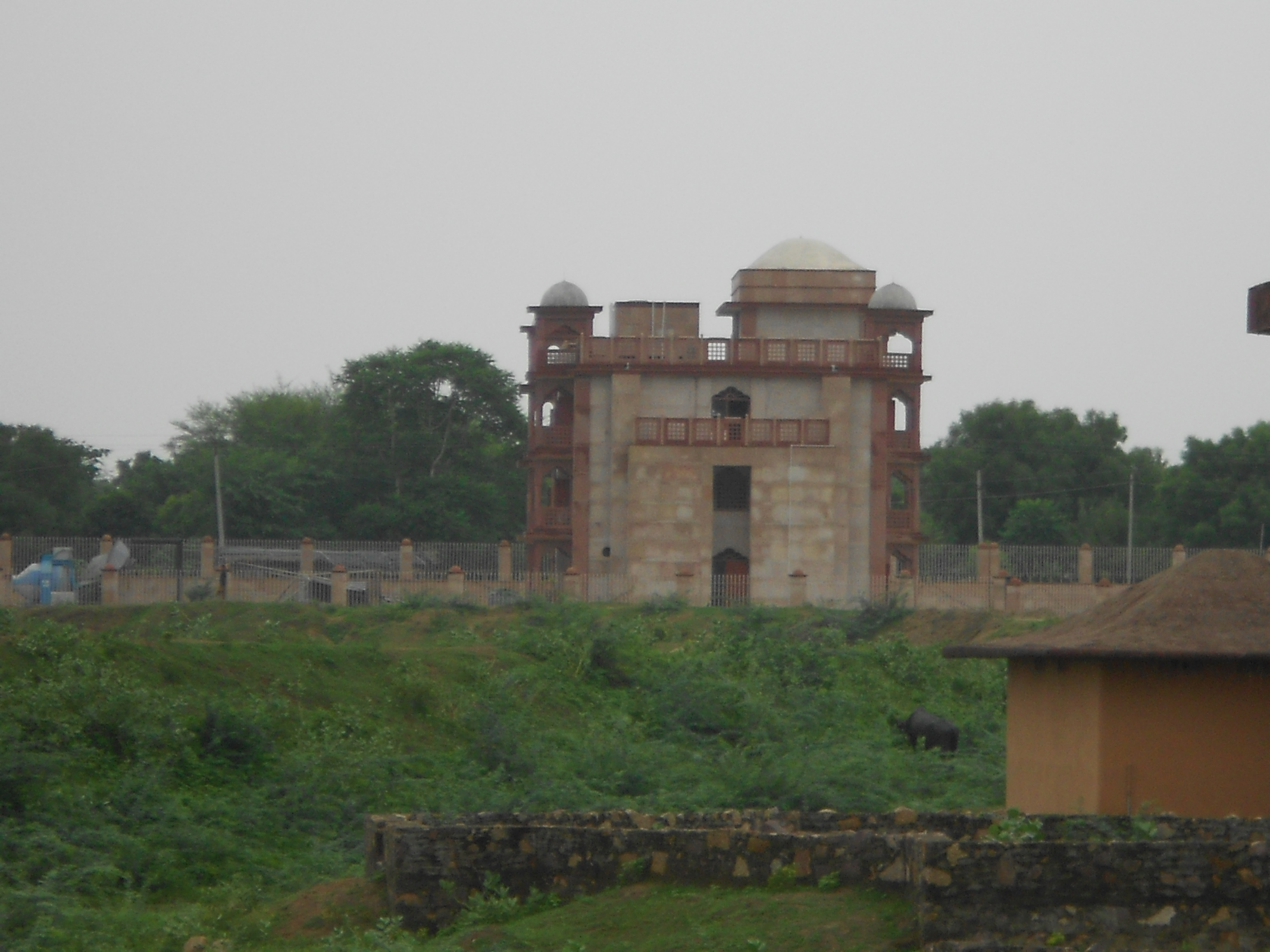
Side View, RMNH, Ramsinghpura, Sawai Madhopur

== Description ==
The Rajiv Gandhi Regional Museum of Natural History is a non-formal center for creating public awareness of nature and natural resources through exhibits and educational activities. It also aims to provide an understanding of the diversity of life on earth and the conservation of nature and natural resources while depicting ecological interrelationship among plants and animals. Visually challenged students can feel the exhibits of animals on the premises. The museum provides an extracurricular activity for schools and promotes environmental awareness.

There are three floor in the museum, with exhibits on plants, livestock, mineral resources and geology of the western region and western dry area of India. As of now, the museum has opened with only the ground floor, gallery 1 on Biodiversity of Rajasthan or Forests and Wildlife of Rajasthan. The main visitor attractions are the facsimile of animals such as chinkara (gazelle), leopard, lion, and tiger. There are village dioramas of the Bishnoi community and Rajasthan rural area. The painting and black pottery hall is on the first floor of the museum, where anyone can enjoy live painting and pottery made by local artist.

There is a library in a hall opposite the reception area, where visitors can read books on wildlife of western India, biodiversity of Rajasthan and more. An auditorium can accommodate 300 people. This is used for seminars and wildlife documentary presentations. The museum also targets at depicting country’s natural heritage and history and attaining international recognition in the succeeding years.

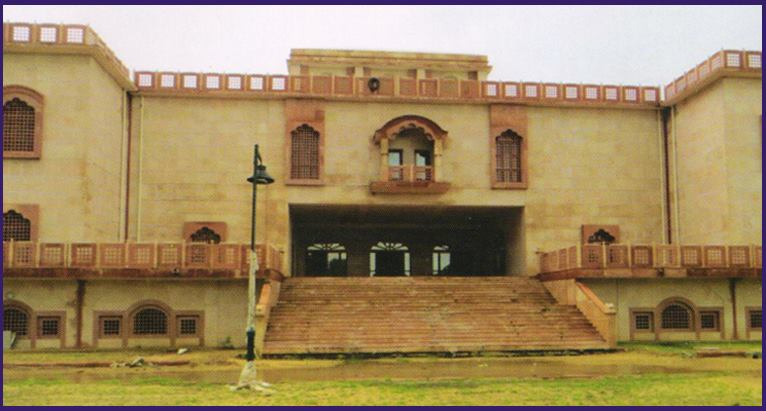
Rajiv Gandhi Regional Museum of Natural History, Sawai Madhopur

== See also ==
- National Museum of Natural History, New Delhi
- Regional Museum of Natural History, Bhopal
- Regional Museum of Natural History, Bhubaneswar
- Regional Museum of Natural History Mysore
- Sawai Madhopur
- Ranthambore National Park
