= Regional Museum of Natural History, Bhopal =

Museum in Madhya Pradesh, India

- RMNH, Bhopal
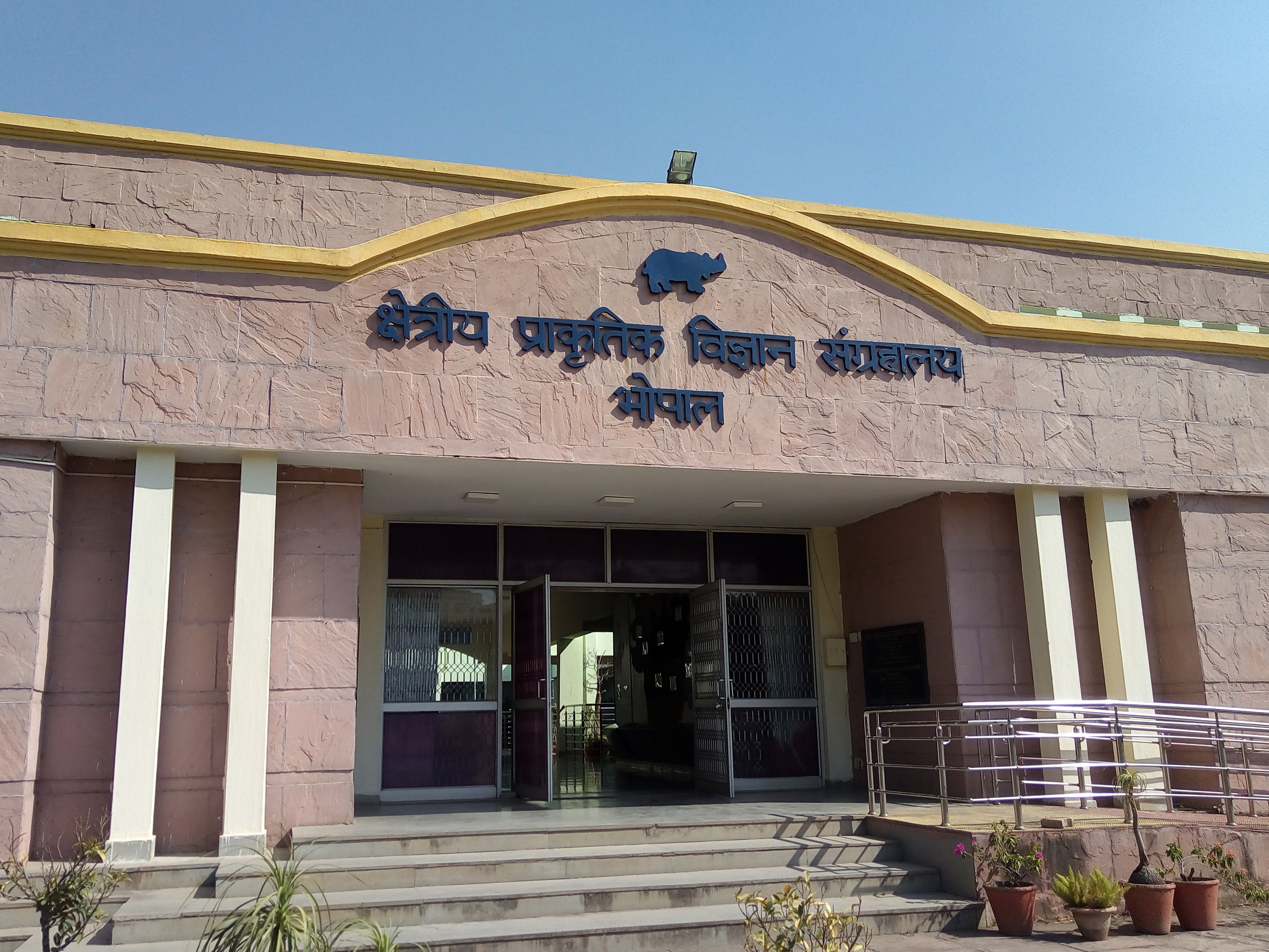
- Established: 29 September 1997
- Location: Paryavaran Parisar E-5, Arera Colony, Bhopal, India
- Coordinates: 23.213743°N 77.426155°E
- Type: Natural history
- Visitors: 7,000 Per Month Approximately
- Directors: Dr. Manoj Kumar Sharma, Scientist-In-charge
- Owner: Ministry of Environment, Forest and Climate Change
- Public transit access: SR8 (Bus)
- Website: nmnh.nic.in/bhopal.htm

The Regional Museum of Natural History, Bhopal, is a branch of the National Museum of Natural History, New Delhi, located in the Environment Complex on Shahpura Lake in Bhopal. The museum was inaugurated on 29 September 1997, by the then Minister of Environment and Forests of India, Saifuddin Soz. The program was chaired by the then Chief Minister of Madhya Pradesh, Digvijaya Singh.

The museum's collection tells the story of the interactions between humans and the natural world, specifically in Central India, and its galleries are accompanied by transcripts, translations and audio tours and include a replica of a Rajasaurus skull.

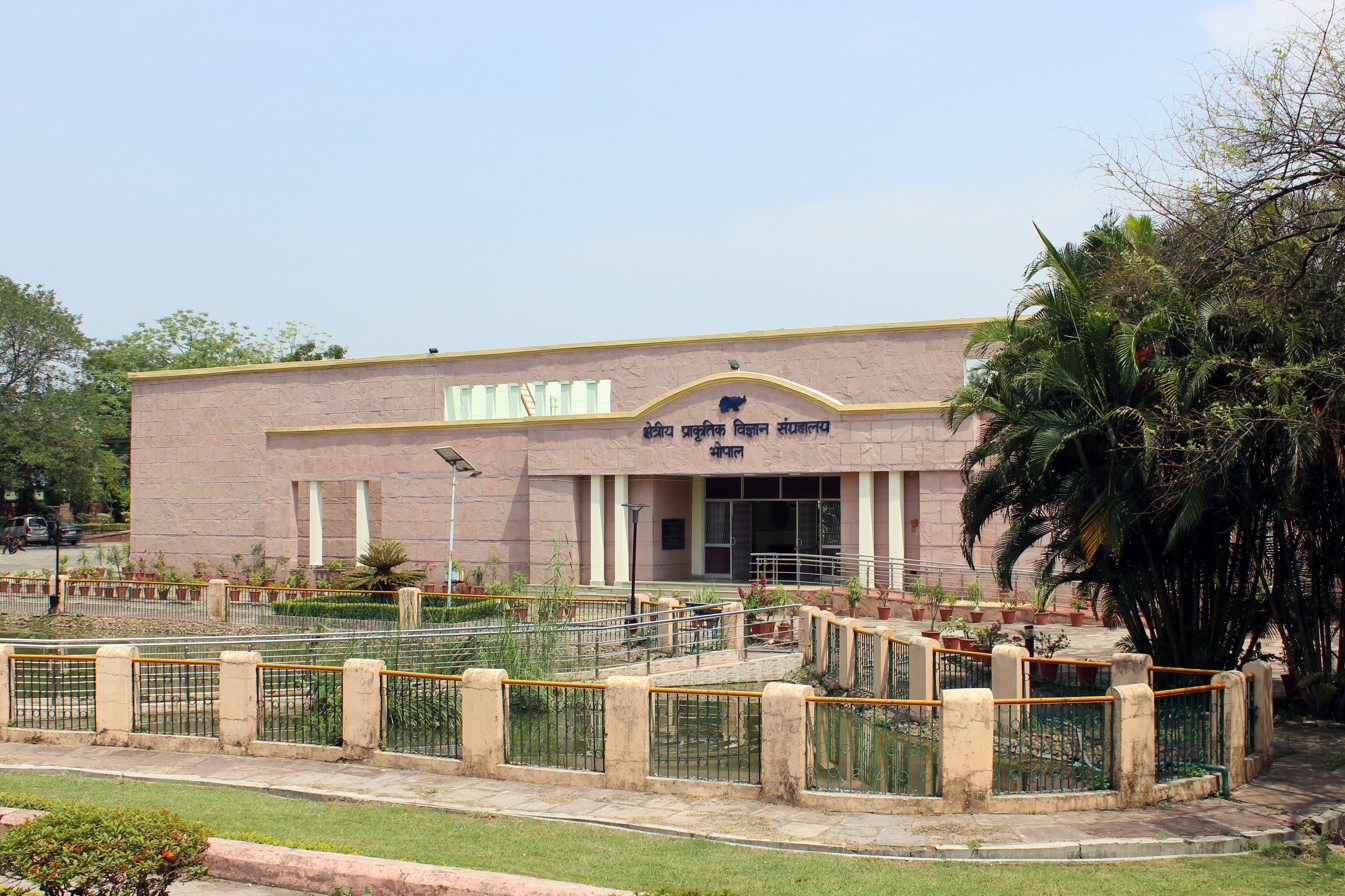
Regional Museum Of Natural History, Bhopal front view

== See also ==
- National Museum of Natural History, New Delhi
- List of destroyed heritage
- Rajiv Gandhi Regional Museum of Natural History, Sawai Madhopur
- Regional Museum of Natural History, Bhubaneswar
- Regional Museum of Natural History, Mysore
