= National Museum of Natural History, New Delhi =

Museum in New Delhi, India

National Museum of Natural History

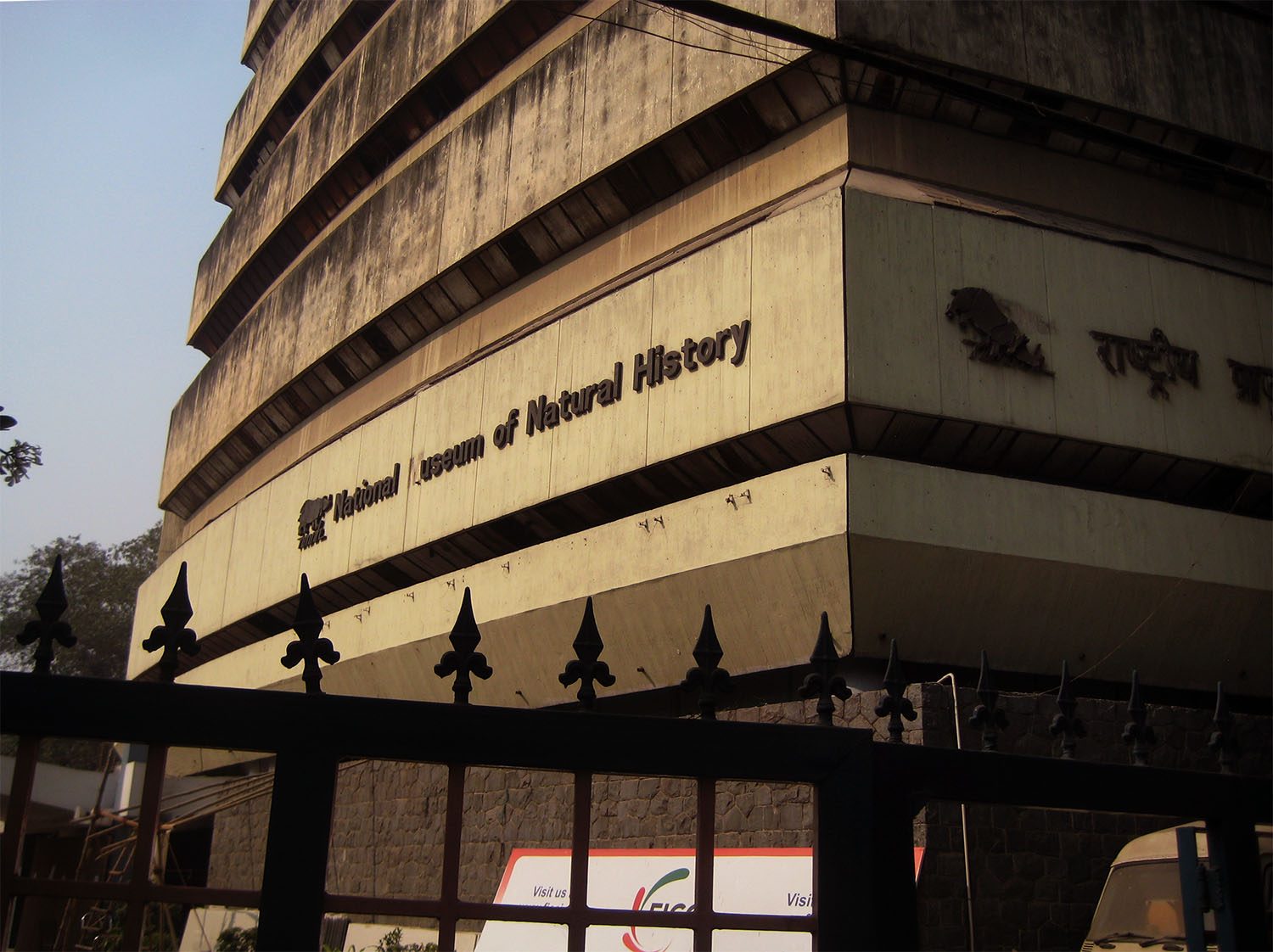
- Museum exterior, 2011
- Established: 1972
- Dissolved: 26 April 2016 (destroyed by fire)
- Location: Barakhamba Road, Tansen Marg, New Delhi, India
- Coordinates: 28.626800°N 77.231560°E
- Type: Natural history
- Owner: Ministry of Environment, Forests and Climate Change
- Public transit access: Mandi House, Delhi Metro
- Website: nmnh.nic.in

The National Museum of Natural History (NMNH) was a museum focusing on nature, located in New Delhi, India. Established in 1972 and opened in 1978, the museum functioned under the Ministry of Environment and Forests of the Government of India. The museum was situated on Barakhamba Road at Tansen Marg in central New Delhi, across from the Embassy of Nepal, near the Connaught Place metro station. On 26 April 2016, the museum building and much of its collection were destroyed by a fire.

Since the fire, the institution has been conducting events in the community while continuing to exhibit at its regional branches in Bhopal, Bhubaneshwar, Mysore and Sawai Madhopur. A new building is planned in New Delhi and, as of 2022, the government had allocated a site of 6.5 acres for it.

== Mission ==
The NMNH's mission was to promote environmental education, both at NMNH in the capital and at Regional Museums of Natural History in other parts of the country; to provide resources such as school loan kits for schools to use in environmental education; to co-ordinate natural history projects with other agencies and organisations, both nationally and internationally; and to conduct natural history research. The NMNH's director, B Venugopal, also emphasised "intangible natural heritage" at the museum.

== History ==
The NMNH was created in 1972 as part of the celebration of the 25th year of India's independence. Indira Gandhi, then Prime Minister of India, said that India needed such a museum "to promote environmental awareness". After several years of development of its building and exhibits, the NMNH opened in 1978, on World Environment Day (5 June).

Following a negative government report in 2012 regarding the building's poor state of maintenance, in July 2015, plans were made to relocate the museum to a ₹ 2.50 billion ($39.4M, €36.4M, or £25.3M as of July 2015) green-certified building at Bhairon Marg, where "The zoological park is close by, [and] so are the National Crafts Museum, Purana Qila and National Science Centre." Regional Museums of Natural History are located in Bhopal, Bhubaneswar, Gangtok, Mysuru, and Sawai Madhopur.

== Destruction ==
In the early morning of 26 April 2016, a fire broke out in the museum and destroyed the entire collection. The fire, which began around 01:30 on the sixth floor of the Federation of Indian Chambers of Commerce & Industry (FICCI) building where the museum had been housed, eventually reached the second floor and destroyed all of the museum's exhibits before fire services were able to bring the flames under control. Around 200 firefighters and 35 fire engines were called; they took more than three and a half hours to extinguish the fire. Six people who became trapped in the building were later sent to a hospital suffering from smoke inhalation.

The cause of the fire was determined to be a short circuit, although the fire's spread was fuelled by museum specimens and the woodwork holding them. Reports indicate that the devastating effect of the blaze was due to the building's sprinkler system being out of order.

== Exhibits ==
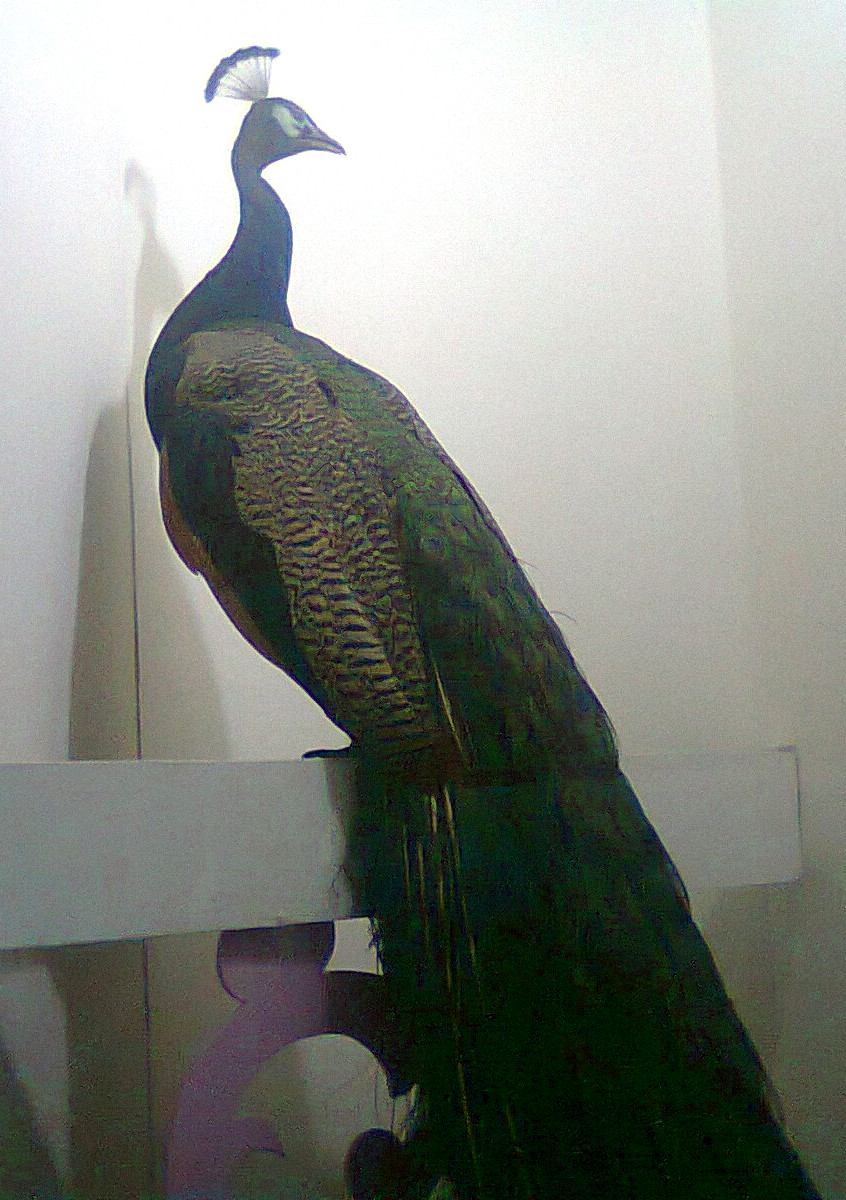
A stuffed peacock on display, representing animals of India

Exhibits at the NMNH were focused on India's plants, animals and mineral wealth, and were divided into four main exhibit galleries: "Cell: The Basic Unit of Life", "Conservation", "Introduction to Natural History", and "Nature's Network: Ecology". The museum had an extensive collection of films on wildlife, ecology, conservation and the environment in general, as well as rare biological specimens, including herpetological specimens, dinosaur fossils and mounted animals. There were also galleries on the origin and evolution of life, conservation of nature, the food chain and exhibits of flora and fauna. A 160 million-year-old fossil of a sauropod and stuffed animals by renowned Mysuru-based taxidermists Van Ingen & Van Ingen were part of the museum collection.

The museum also featured a Discovery Room and Activity Room, specifically designed for children, where designated specimens could be handled by visitors. Guided tours, and specially designed resources for disabled visitors, were also available. Specific exhibits included a sauropod fossil, "a collection of bird eggs including those of the ostrich and the long-billed vulture", and "stuffed animals including various big cats".

Plans for future exhibitions, as of 2015, had included "climate change, global warming, combating desertification, tsunami, [and] depletion of [the] ozone layer" as well as "more digital displays ... [a]nd an IMAX theatre". The museum was also acquiring dinosaur egg fossils from Narmada Valley, Gujarat.

== See also ==
- List of destroyed heritage
- Rajiv Gandhi Regional Museum of Natural History, Sawai Madhopur
- Regional Museum of Natural History, Bhubaneswar
- Regional Museum of Natural History, Mysore
- Regional Museum of Natural History, Bhopal
- National Museum of Brazil fire
