= Regional Museum of Natural History, Bhubaneswar =

Coordinates: 20.299611°N 85.832063°E

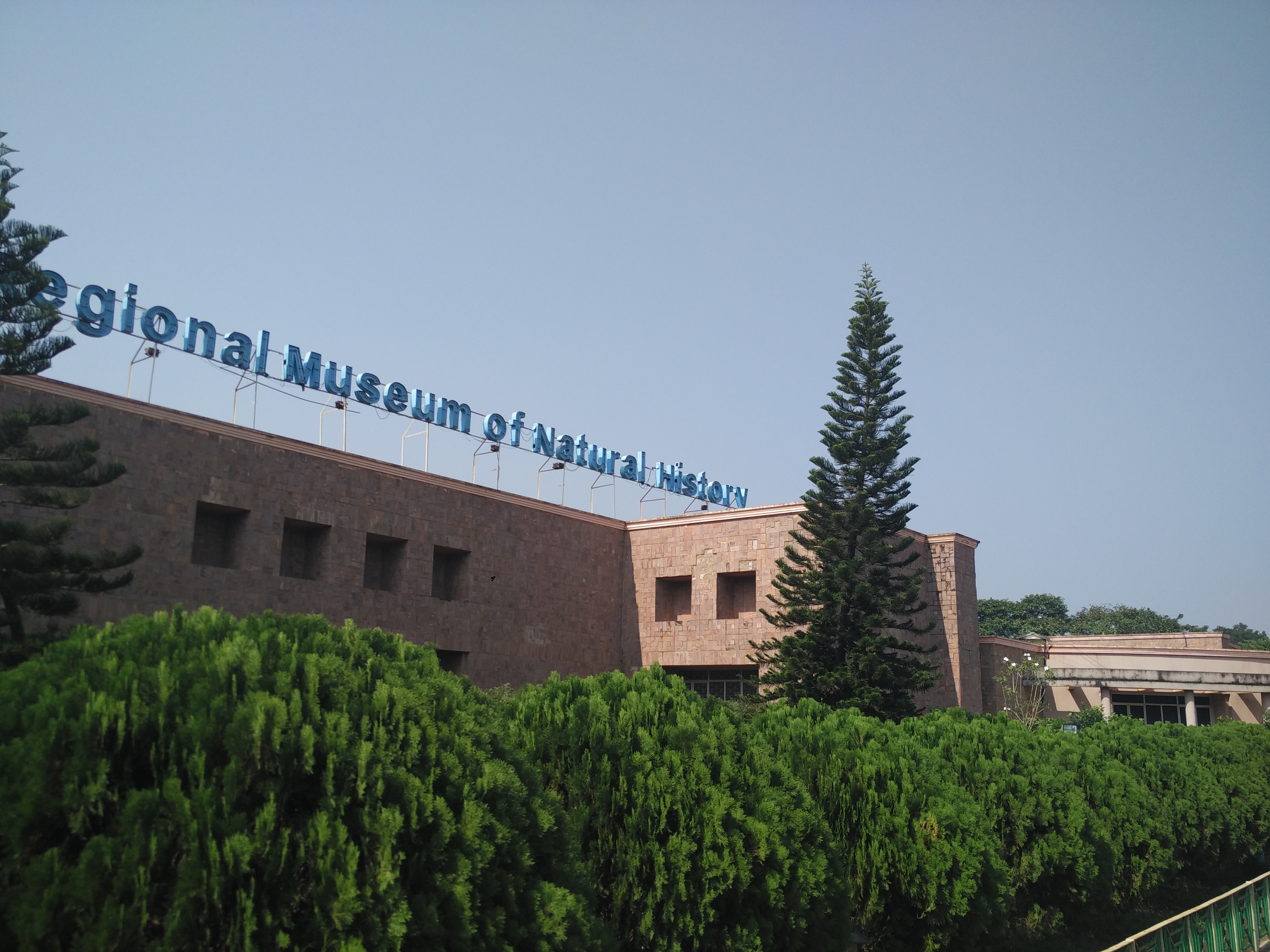
Regional Museum of Natural History Bhubaneswar

The Regional Museum of Natural History, Bhubaneswar is a museum in Bhubaneswar, Odisha, India with exhibits on plants, animals and geology of the eastern region of India. The Regional Museum of Natural History at Bhubaneswar, was inaugurated in 2004. It was undertaken by the Ministry of Environment and Forests, Government of India. The museum is located near Acharaya Vihar Square on Sachivalaya Marg, Bhubaneswar. The museum exhibits plants, animals and geology of the Odisha, the Eastern and north-eastern India and the Andaman and Nicobar Islands of India. The galleries emphasize the conservation of nature and natural resources while depicting ecological interrelationship among plants and animals. Visually challenged students can feel the exhibits of animals on the premises. The museum provides an extracurricular activity for schools and promotes environmental awareness. A skeleton of baleen whale has been installed in the museum, which is supposed to be largest for any museum in India. Since May, 2017 this museum became one of the first museums in india to generate and use green energy though solar power production. This grid connected solar power plant is of roof type and generate 189 KvA electricity per month which makes it largest rooftop solar power plant in Odisha.

== See also ==
- National Museum of Natural History, New Delhi
- Regional Museum of Natural History, Bhopal
- Regional Museum of Natural History Mysore
- Rajiv Gandhi Regional Museum of Natural History, Sawai Madhopur
- Odisha State Museum
- Tribal Research Institute Museum
- List of Museums in Odisha
