= Regional Museum of Natural History Mysore =

Coordinates: 12°18′21.07″N 76°40′26.76″E

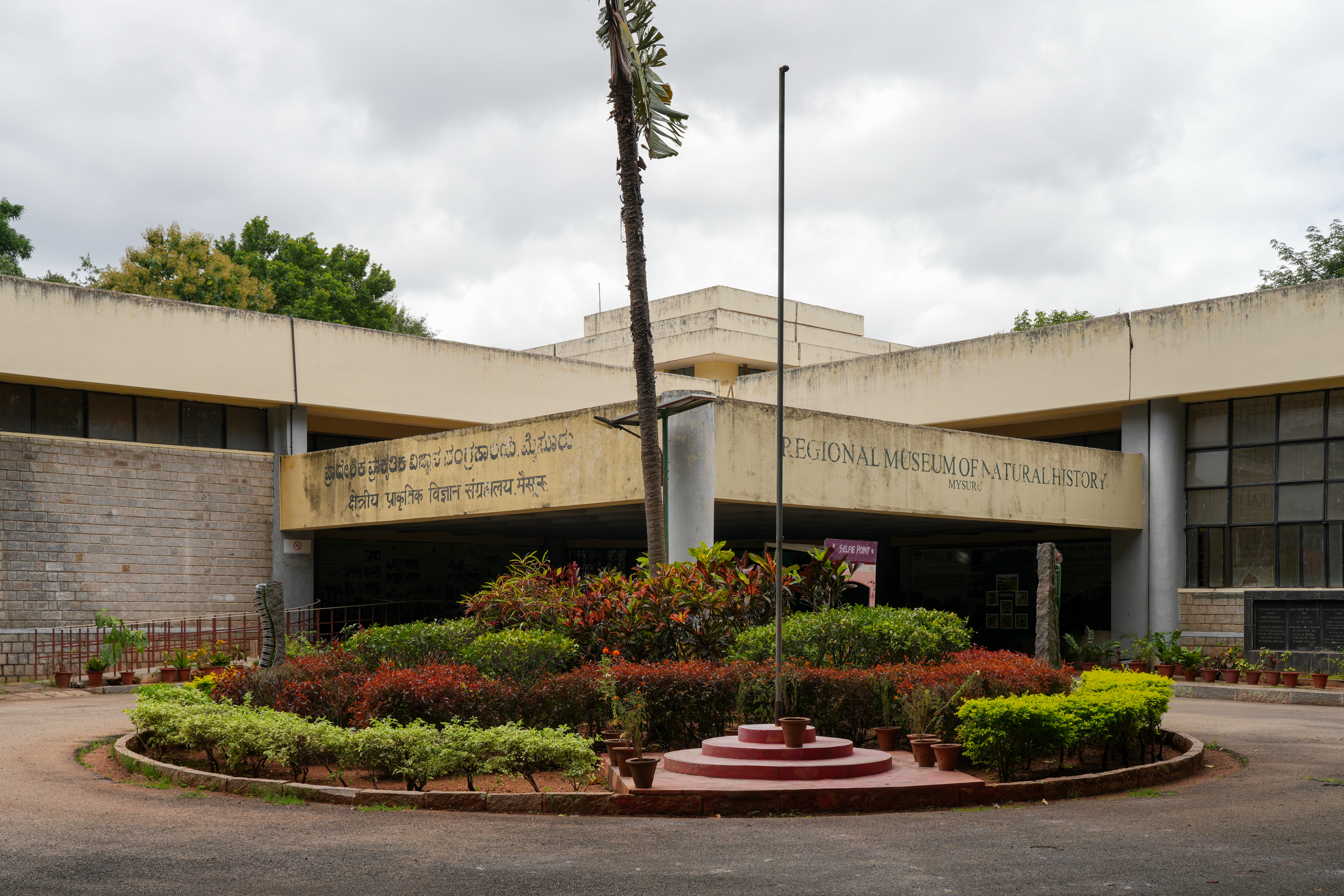
Entrance to the main building

The Regional Museum of Natural History at Mysore is a museum in India with exhibits on plants, animals and geology of the southern region of India. Established in 1995, it is located on the banks of Karanji Lake.

== Description ==
The Regional Museum of Natural History at Mysore was inaugurated on 20 May 1995. It was undertaken by the government of India, Ministry of Environment and Forests. The museum is located on the banks of Karanji Lake, with the Chamundi Hills visible in the background and is spread over an area of 5.25 acres. It is now a landmark in the city. The museum exhibits plants, animals and geology of the southern region of India. The galleries emphasize the conservation of nature and natural resources while depicting ecological interrelationship among plants and animals. Visually challenged students can feel the exhibits of animals on the premises. The museum provides for extracurricular activities for school students and promotes environmental awareness.

== Galleries ==
- Biological Diversity: It has multiple sections. The first section has a special emphasis on the Western Ghats. It exhibits the biodiversity of the southern region of India. The next section is about tropical rain forests, of countries that possess them, showcasing their diversity and global benefits. The next section is on the significance of wetlands and the mangrove forests. The next section depicts a diorama of a marine habitat. The last section has a large exhibit panel cautioning against the destruction natural diversity.
- Life through the Ages: This is walk-through tunnel, depicting evolution of life.
- The Discovery Center: It consists of a discovery room, a computer room, a vivarium and a mini weather station. Children can handle, examine and study specimens in the discovery room. A mini theater, a sound booth are also present to keep children occupied. The bioscience computer room facilitates studying biology through interactive and multimedia techniques at a high-school or college level.

== Botanical garden ==
On the grounds of the museum is a small botanical garden with local trees and a collection of plants used in Ayurvedic medicine.

The gardens include an interpretative trail section designed for the visually impaired with not only signs in brail but also a sunken foot bridge to provide a "walk in water" experience of aquatic plants and fishes. Museum curators describe this section as "the first museum garden for the visually impaired in India."

== See also ==
- National Museum of Natural History, New Delhi
- Regional Museum of Natural History, Bhopal
- Regional Museum of Natural History, Bhubaneswar
- Rajiv Gandhi Regional Museum of Natural History, Sawai Madhopur
