= Jayanagar, Mysore =

Suburb in Mysore, Karnataka

Jayanagar
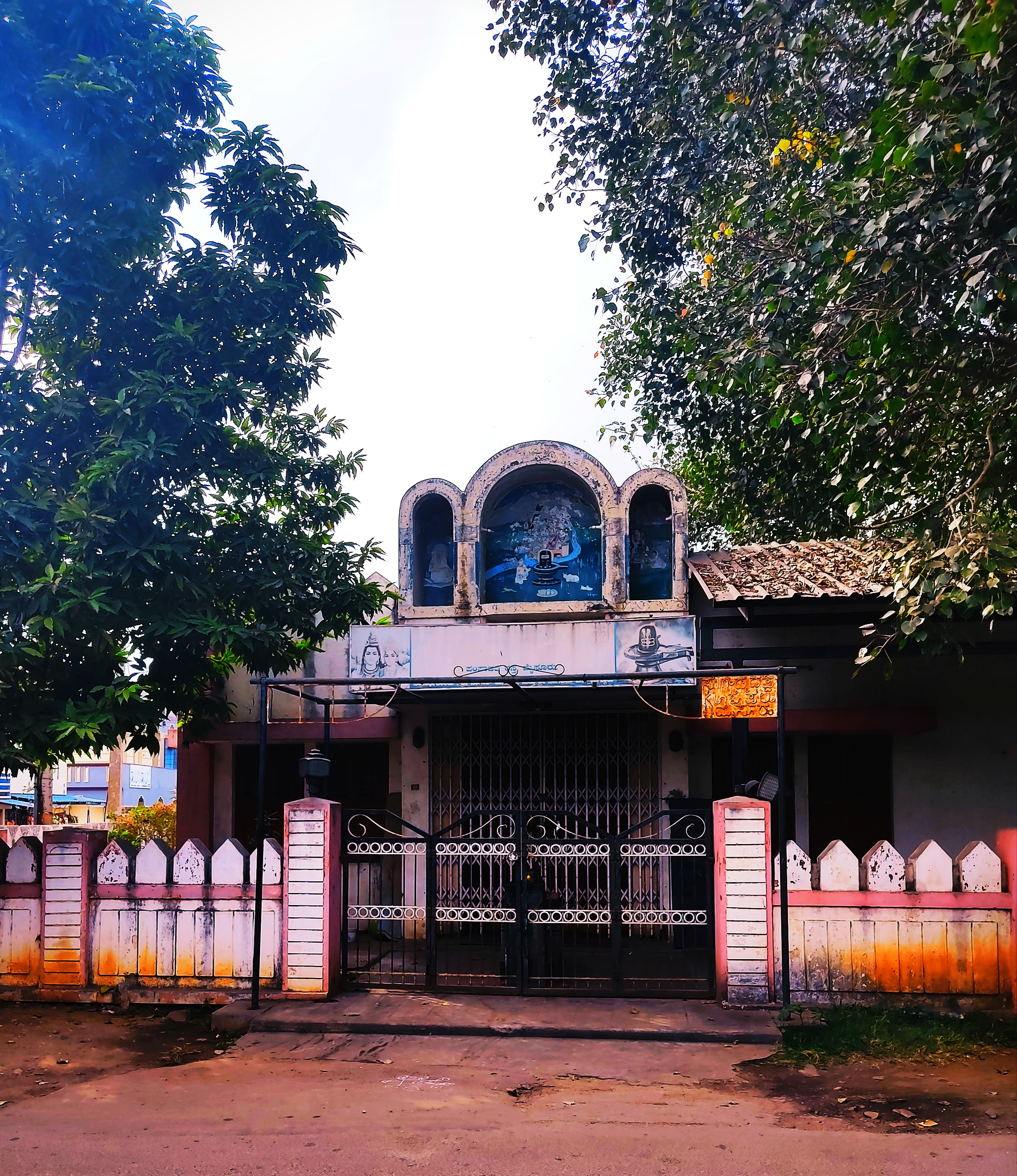
- Bedara Kannappa temple, Jayanagar
- Interactive map of Jayanagar
- Coordinates: 12.292505°N 76.638080°E
- Country: India
- State: Karnataka
- District: Mysore
- Time zone: UTC+05:30 (IST)
- PIN: 570014

Jayanagar is a residential suburb in Mysore city of the state of Karnataka in India. It is 4 km from the Mysore city bus stand. Noted landmarks in Jayanagar are Sankethi hostel, Srirama Mandira, ISKCON temple, Prashanth PG and Bedara Kannappa temple.

== Transport ==
The nearest railway station is Ashokapuram, 2 kilometer away. City buses No. 53, 60, 61, 63 connect this suburb to the city bus stand.

== Gallery ==
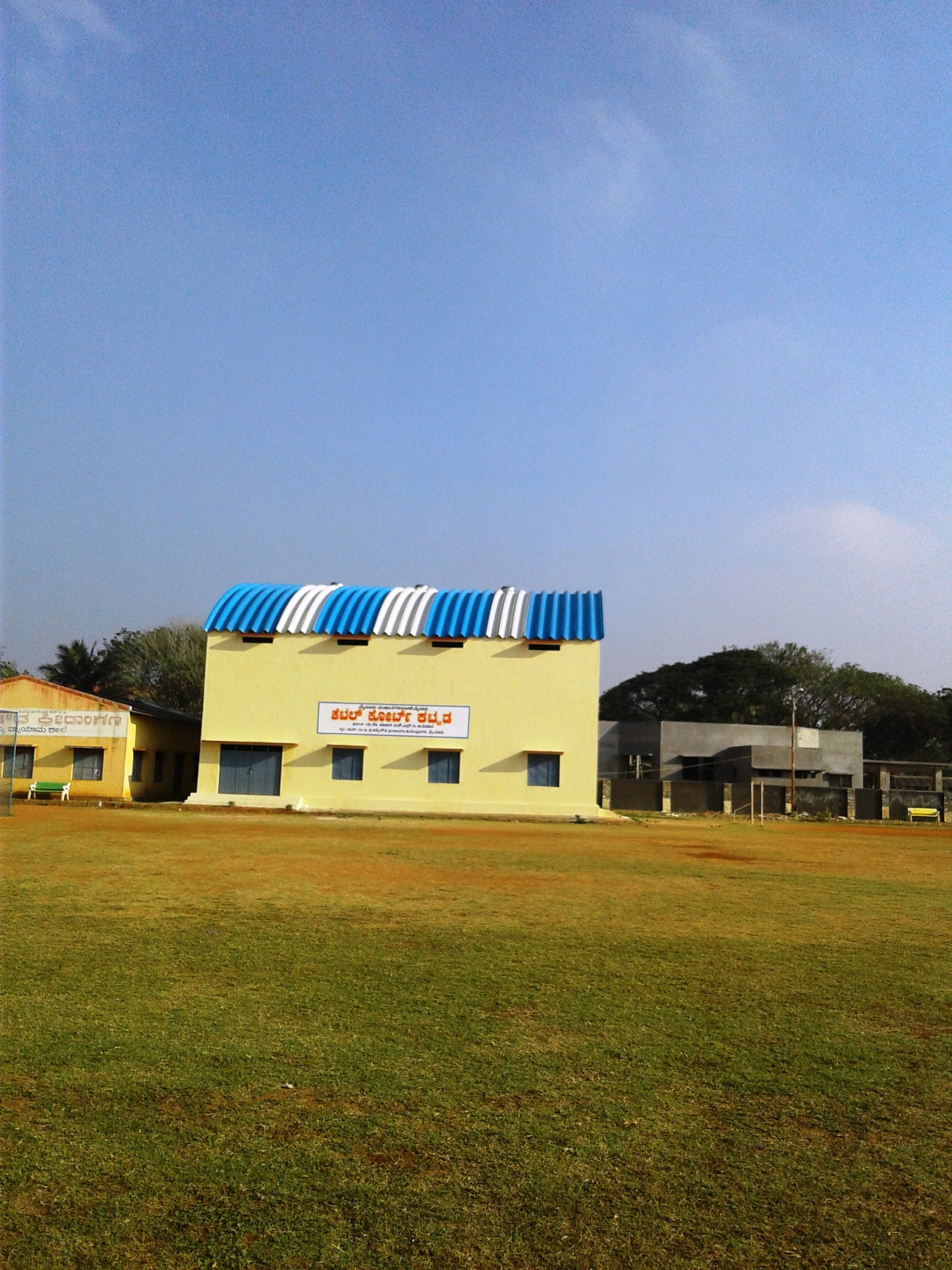
Jayanagar cricket stadium

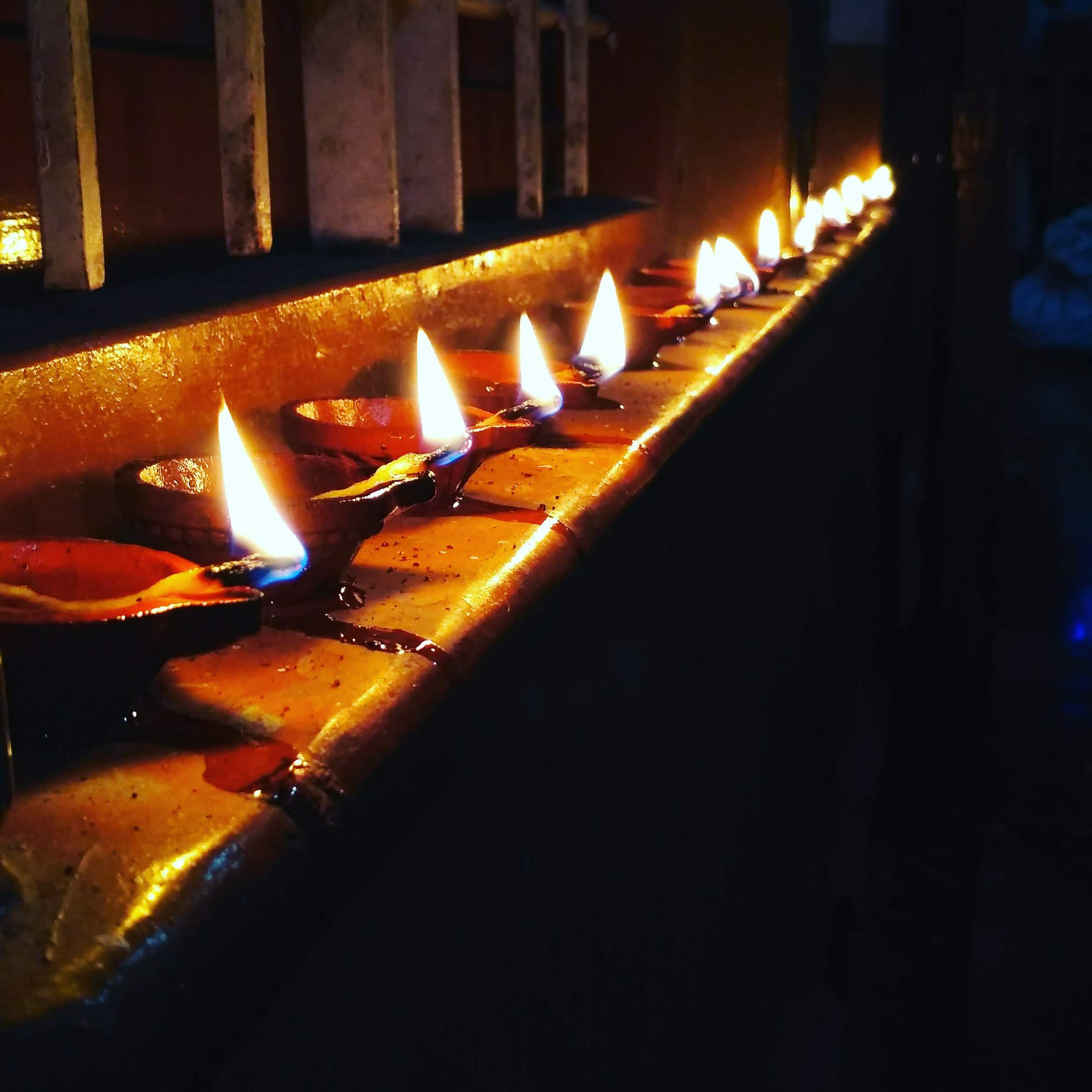
Deepavali celebration at Bedara Kannappa temple, Jayanagar

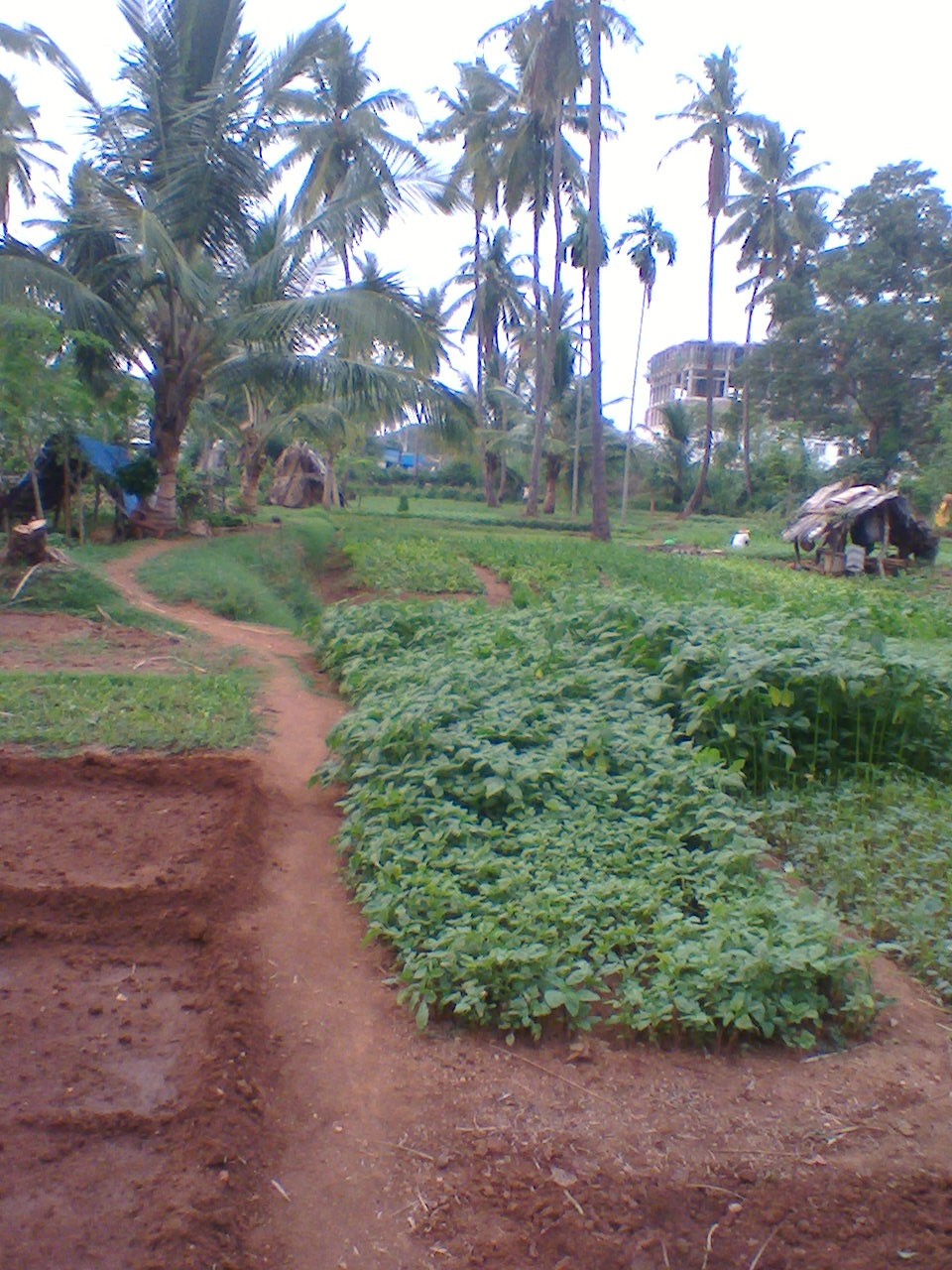
Farm in the middle of the city at Jayanagar

== See also ==
- Akshaya Bhandar
- Kuvempunagar
- Ballal Circle
- Raghavendra Nagar
- Kalyanagiri
