= Indian Skill Development Service =

Indian Civil Service

The Indian Skill Development Services or 'ISDS' is one of the gazetted Central Civil Services (technical) under Group 'A' of the executive branch of the Government of India. It's is newest Central service. This service is created for training directorate of Ministry of Skill Development and Entrepreneurship.

== Appointment and cadre ==
The appointment to this service is done through Combined Engineering Services Exam held every year by Union Public Service Commission (UPSC) of India.

It has 263 all India posts, the cadre comprises 3 post at senior administrative grade while 28 are at junior grade. While 120 posts at Senior Time Scale and 112 posts at Junior Time Scale.

Generally they are inducted through training at Administrative Training Institute, Mysuru. The first batch was inducted in 2019.

== Area of Work ==
- Ministry of Skill Development and Entrepreneurship
- National Skill Development Corporation
- Director General of Training
- NITI Aayog
- National Council for Vocational Education and Training
- Pradhan Mantri Kaushal Vikas Yojana

== Roles and responsibilities ==
The following are the roles and responsibilities of an Indian Skills Development Services Officer,

- Designing skill development policies
- Implementing PM Kaushal Yojana and National Apprentice Programs
- Training Institutes for Industrial Training (ITIs) and vocational training centers
- Public-Private Partnership (PPP) in skilling
- Digital & emerging technology skilling

== See also ==
- Skill India
- National Skill Development Corporation
- List of Indian entrepreneurs
- National Skill Development Agency
