= Sathgulli =

Sathgalli
- Interactive map of Sathgalli
- Coordinates: 12.33313°N 76.69328°E
- Country: India
- State: Karnataka
- District: Mysuru
- Time zone: UTC+05:30 (IST)

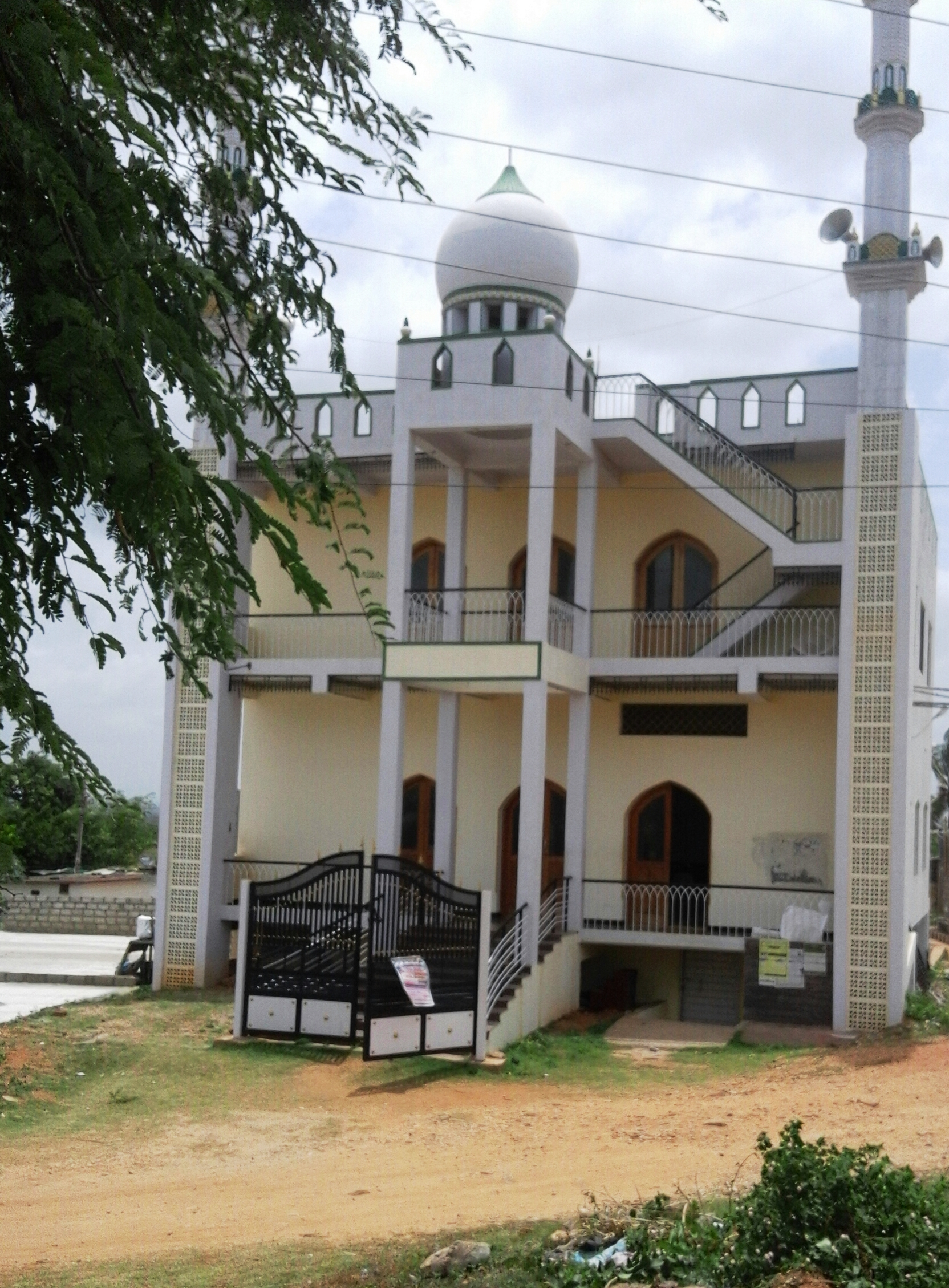
Zahida Masjidh, Sathgalli

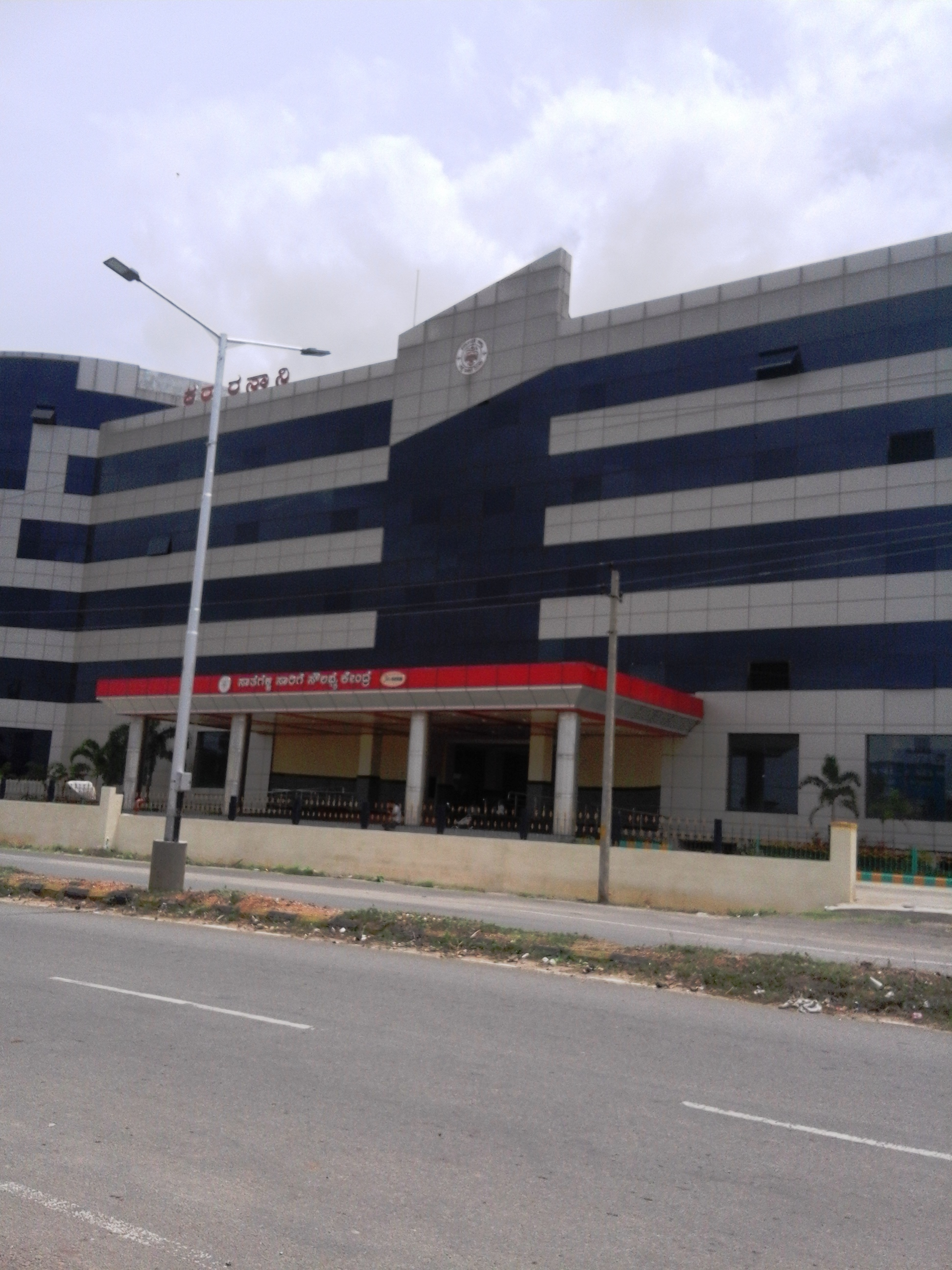
Bus station at Sathgalli

Sathgalli, also known as Sathagalli, is an urban extension of Mysore city in Karnataka province of India.

== Location ==
Sathgulli is located on the eastern side of Mysore city. Part of the locality lies inside the ring road and is highly commercial and urban in nature. Part of the locality lies outside the ring road and has a residential and rural layout.

== Bus terminal ==
Karnataka State Road Transport Corporation (KSRTC) has built a modern and sprawling bus station in Sathgulli for future use. The bus station has already started operations in a limited way serving the eastern side of Mysore city.

== Residential layouts ==
A large number of residential layouts have appeared in and around Sathgulli junction. Many of them are developing housing plots and other facilities for families.

== See also ==
- Mysore East
- Mysore Zoo
- Mahadevapura, Mandya
