= Siddhartha Nagar =

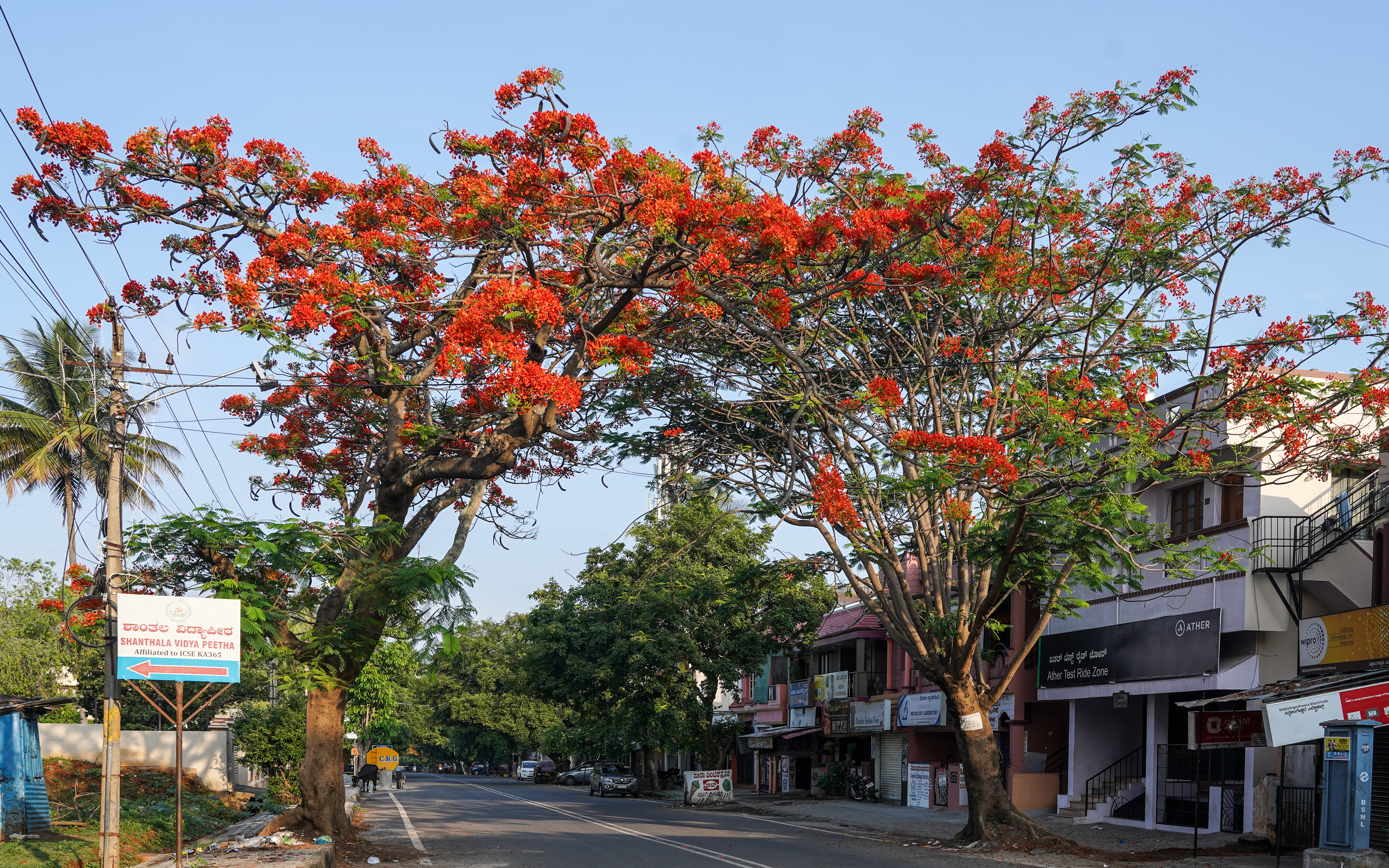
- Nicknames: Vinaya Marga, main road in the locality
- Interactive map of Siddhartha Nagar
- Coordinates: 12.3044°N 76.6841°E
- Country: India
- State: Karnataka
- District: Mysorae
- Time zone: UTC+5:30 (IST)
- PIN: 570011

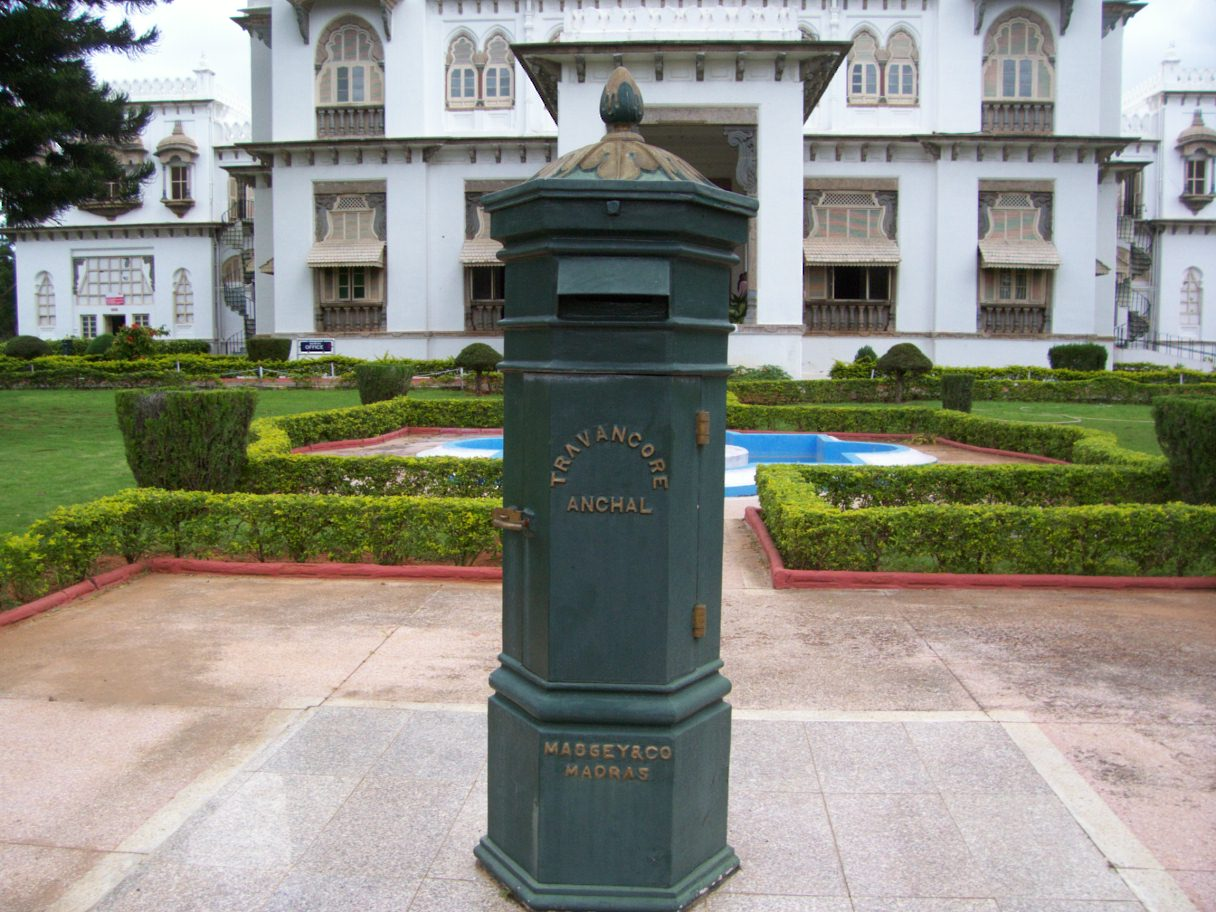
Travancore Anchal at PTC, Nazrabad

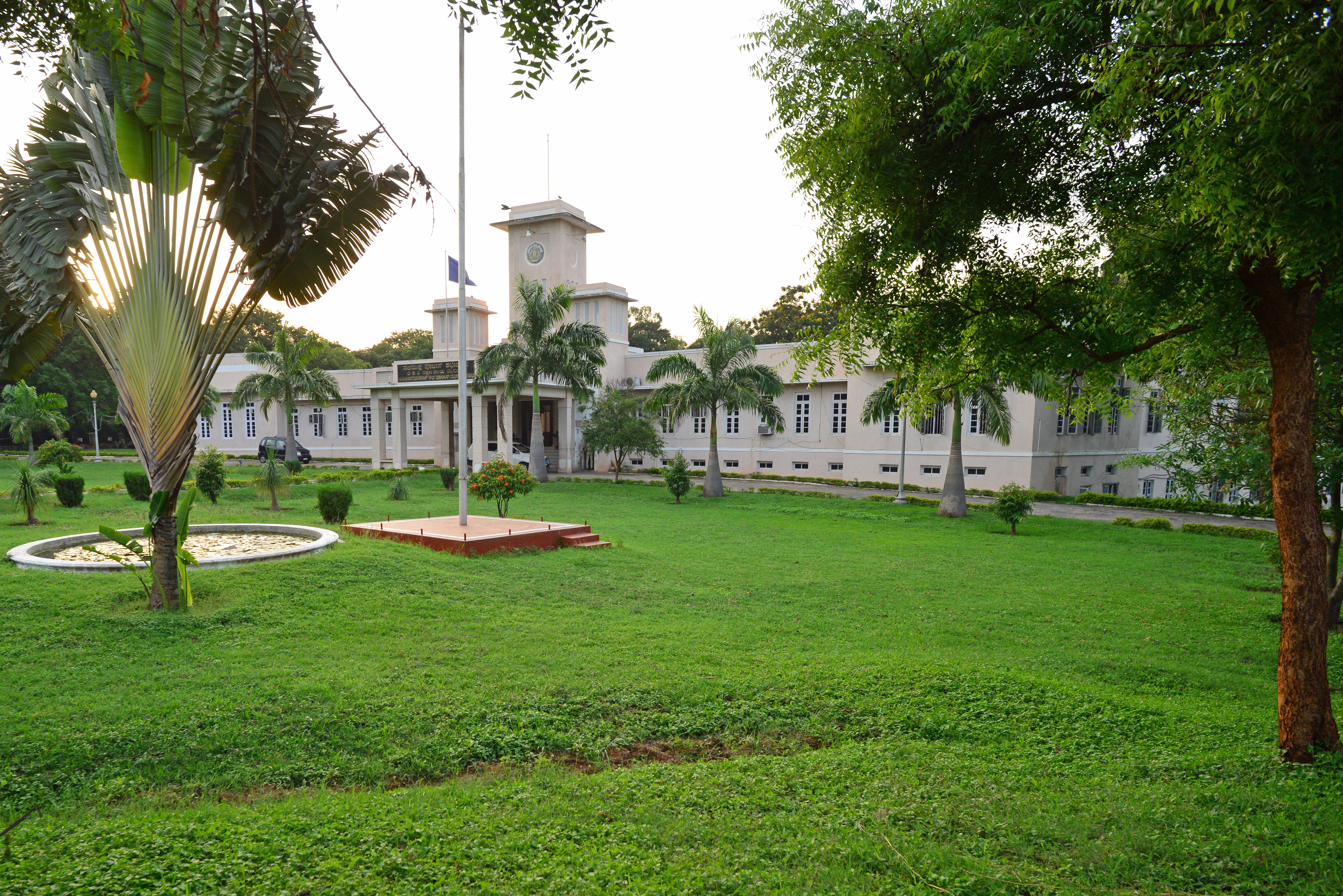
Police Headquarters in Mysore

Siddhartha Nagar is an eastern suburb of Mysore city in Karnataka, a south Indian state.

== Location ==
Siddhartha Nagar spans Bannur Road, Teresian College Road, and surrounding areas. The Bannur Road Junction on the Ring Road is the centre of the whole suburb. This is considered an expensive suburb of Mysore because many upmarket hotels and residential apartments are located here. WARD: 53(KURUBAARA HALLI) KRISHNARAJA CONSTITUENCY

== Post offices ==
Siddartha Nagar Post Office has the pincode Mysore-570011, and another post office with the same pincode is located at the Administrative Training Institute.

- Teresian School
- JSS Public School
- Anugraha Hospital
- Lalitha mahal palace hotel
- Geetha school

KMF Milk dairy DFRL

== Image gallery ==
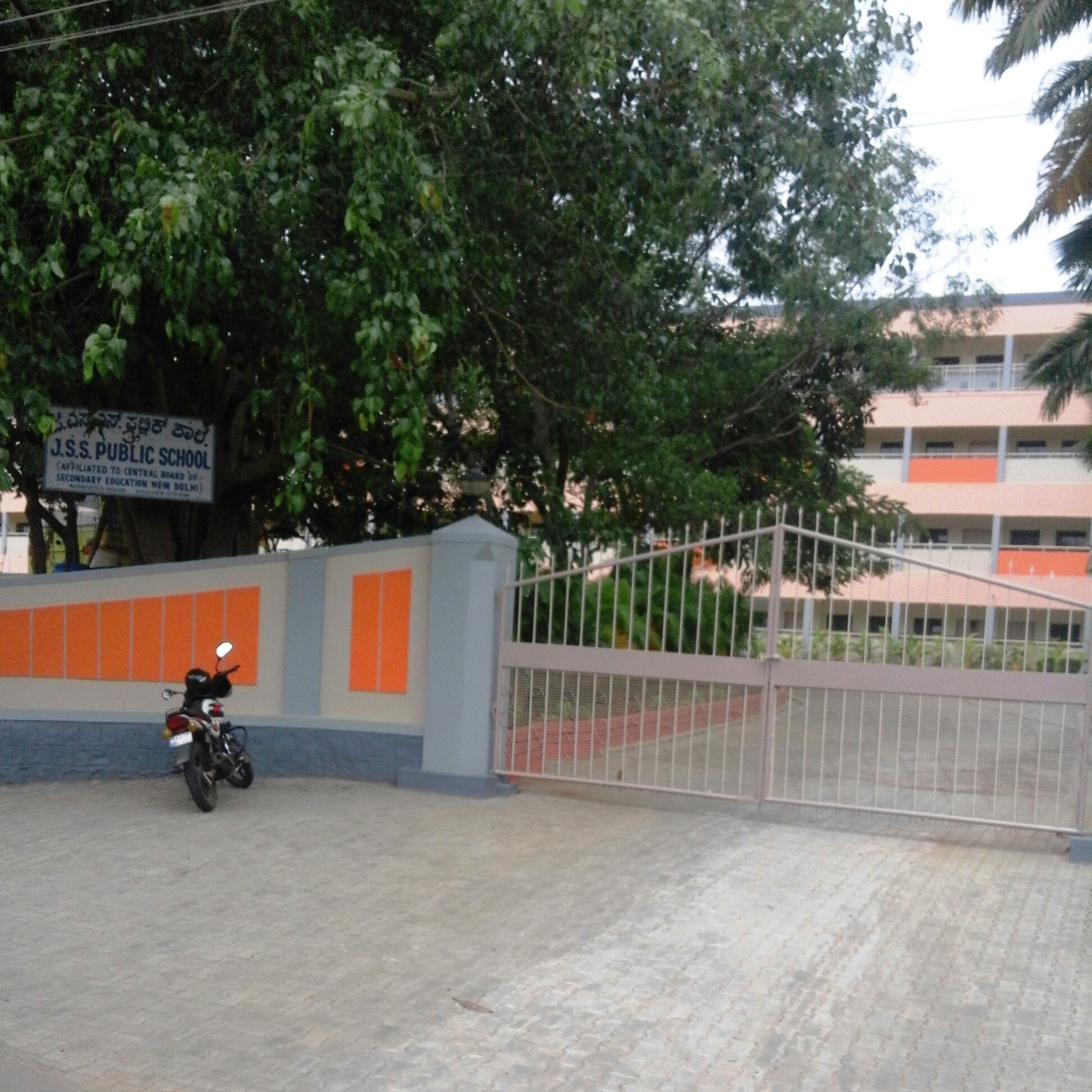
JSS School

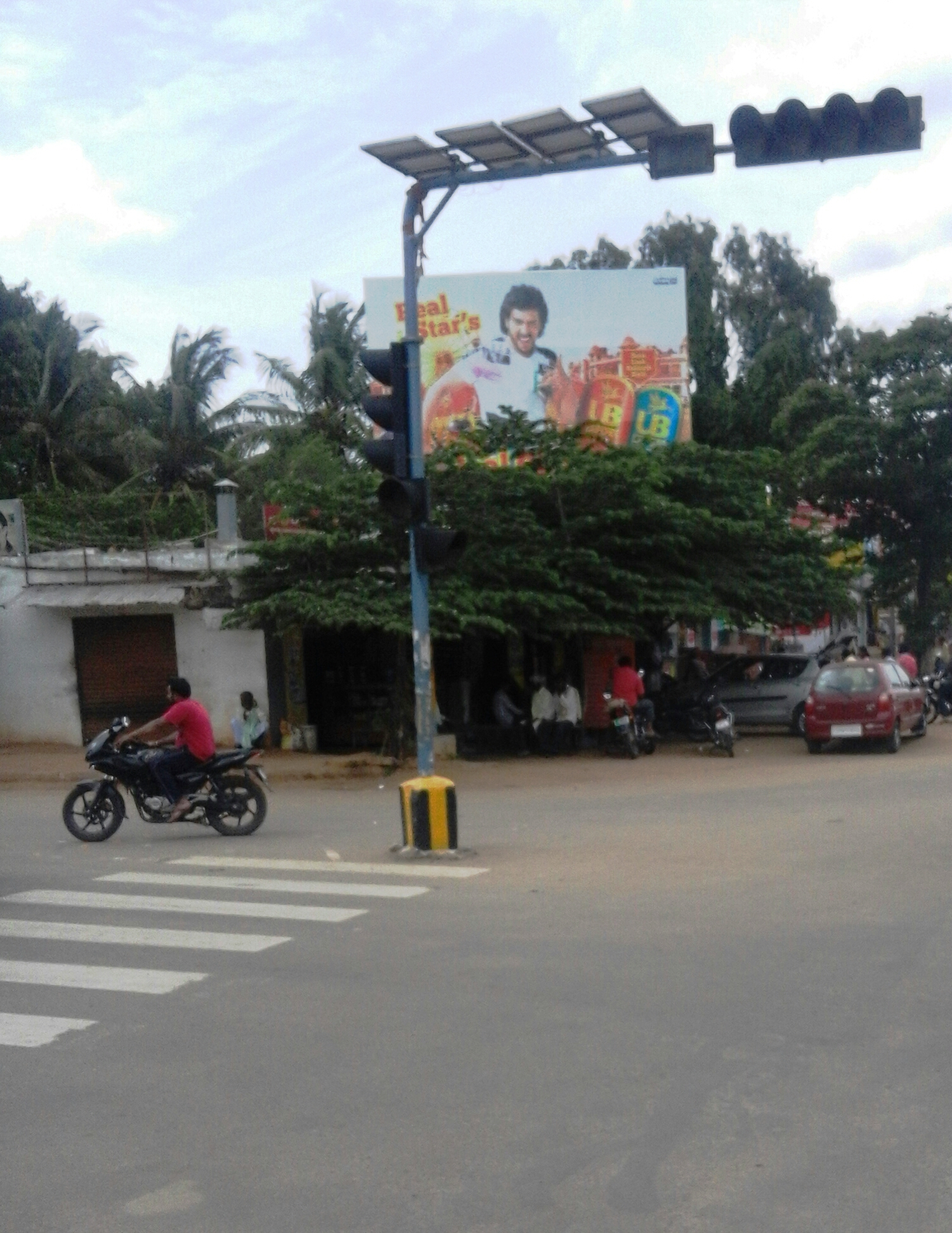
Bannur Road junction

== See also ==
- Kalyanagiri
- Mysore Zoo
- Sathgulli
- Karanji Lake
- Raghavendra Nagar
- Administrative Training Institute, Mysore
