= Mahadevapura, Mandya =

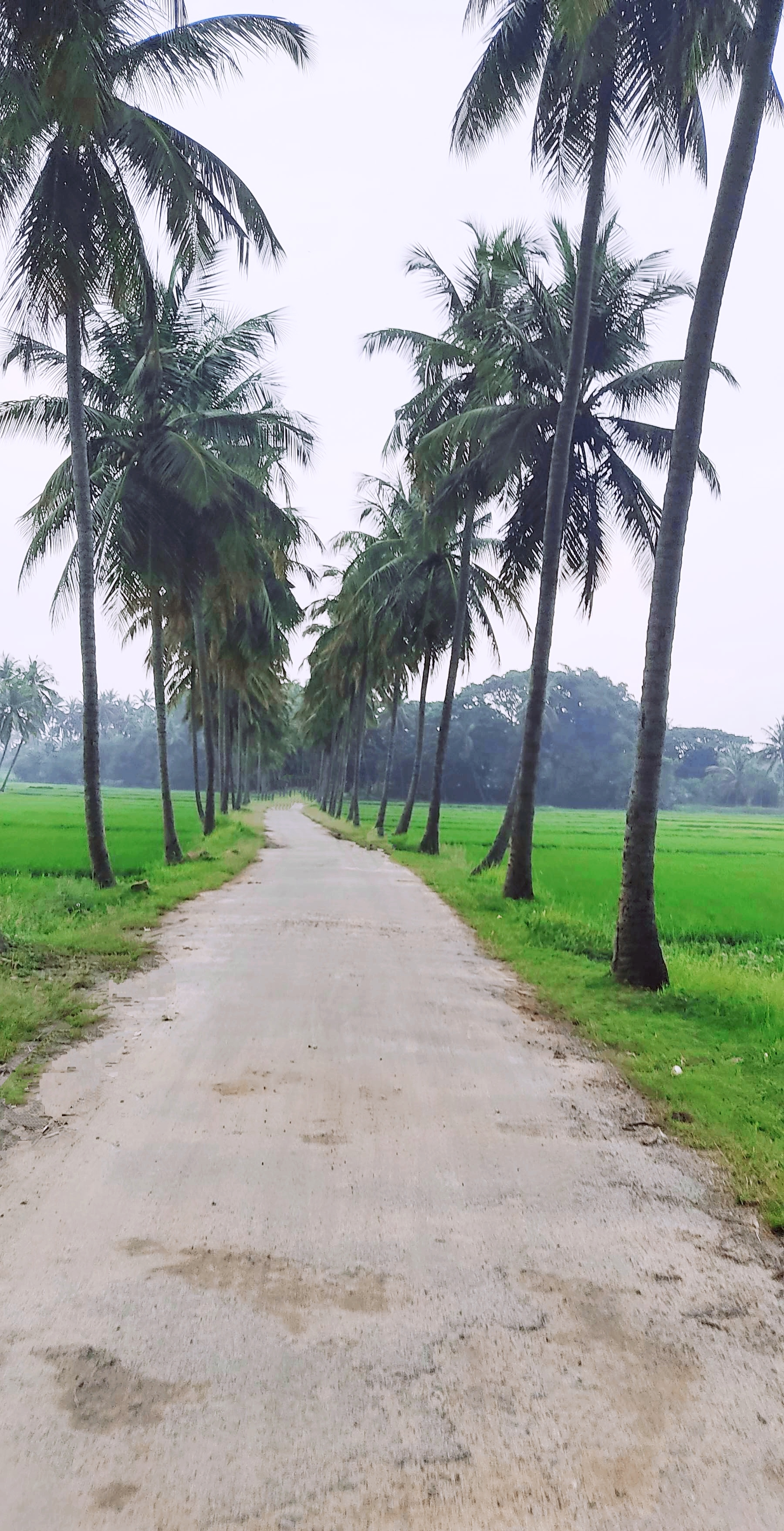
- A shooting spot, Mahadevapura
- Interactive map of Mahadevapura, Mandya
- Coordinates: 12.39701°N 76.77555°E
- Country: India
- State: Karnataka
- District: Mandya
- Time zone: UTC+5:30 (IST)
- PIN: 571415

Mahadevapura is a village in Mandya district of Karnataka province in India. It is 16 kilometres (9.9 mi) from Mysore city. The village and its surrounding places are known for film shooting.

== Transportation ==
The road from Mysore to Mahadevapura starts from Sathgully bus station in East Mysore. It goes through Ramanahalli village before reaching Mahadevapura bridge. The river Kaveri has a bund here.

== Image gallery ==
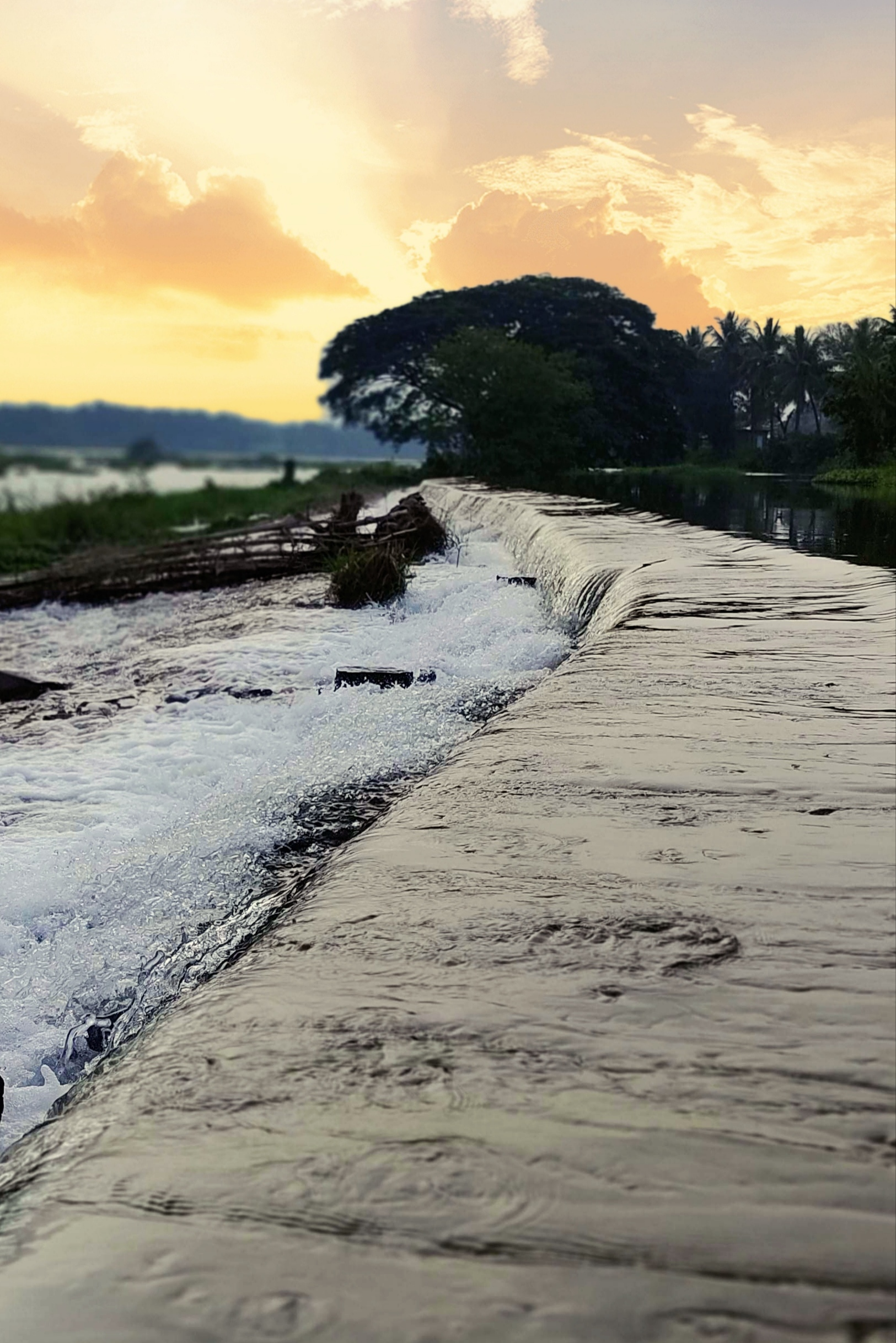
The Kaveri river point, Mahadevapura

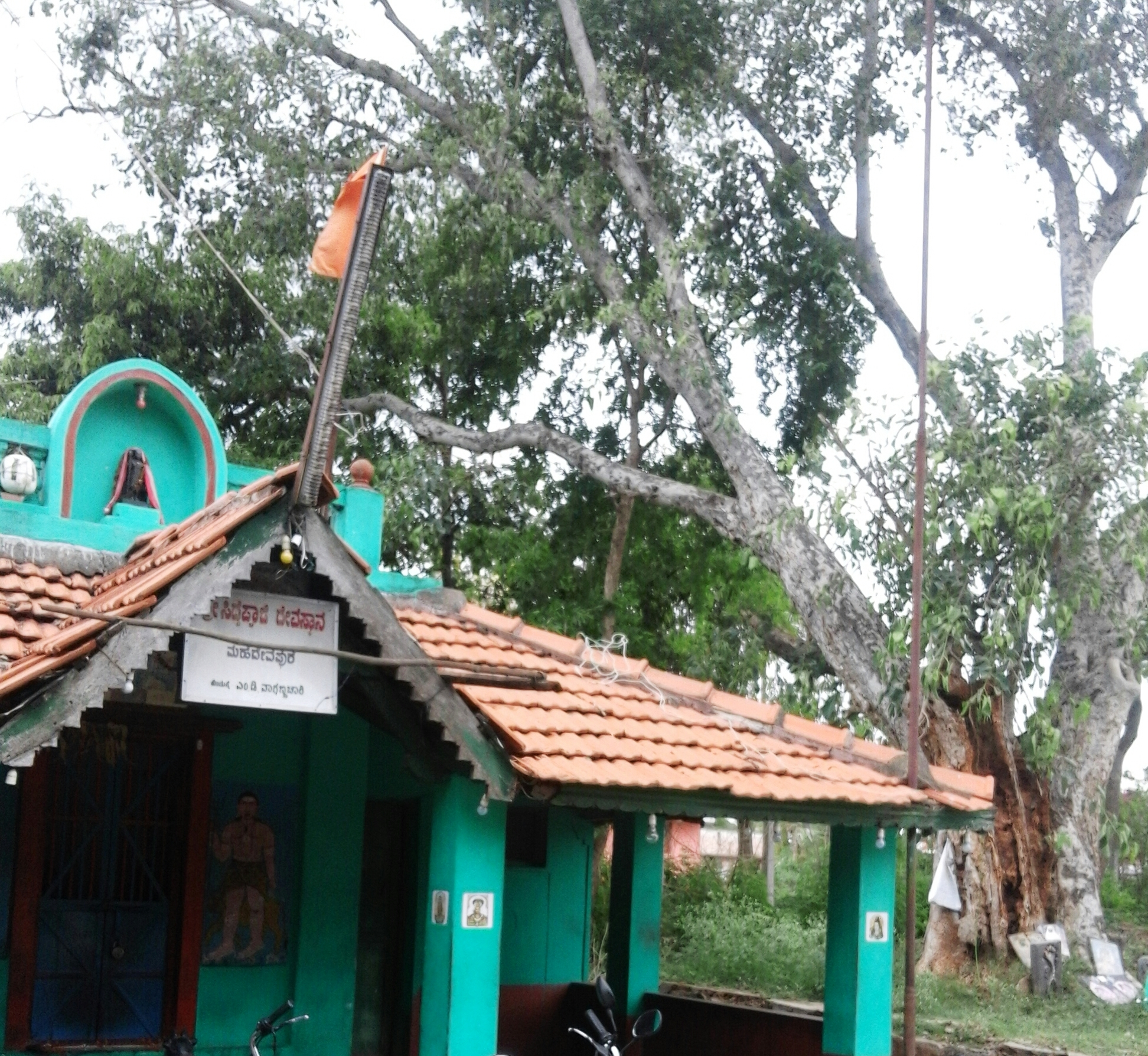
Small temple on the river

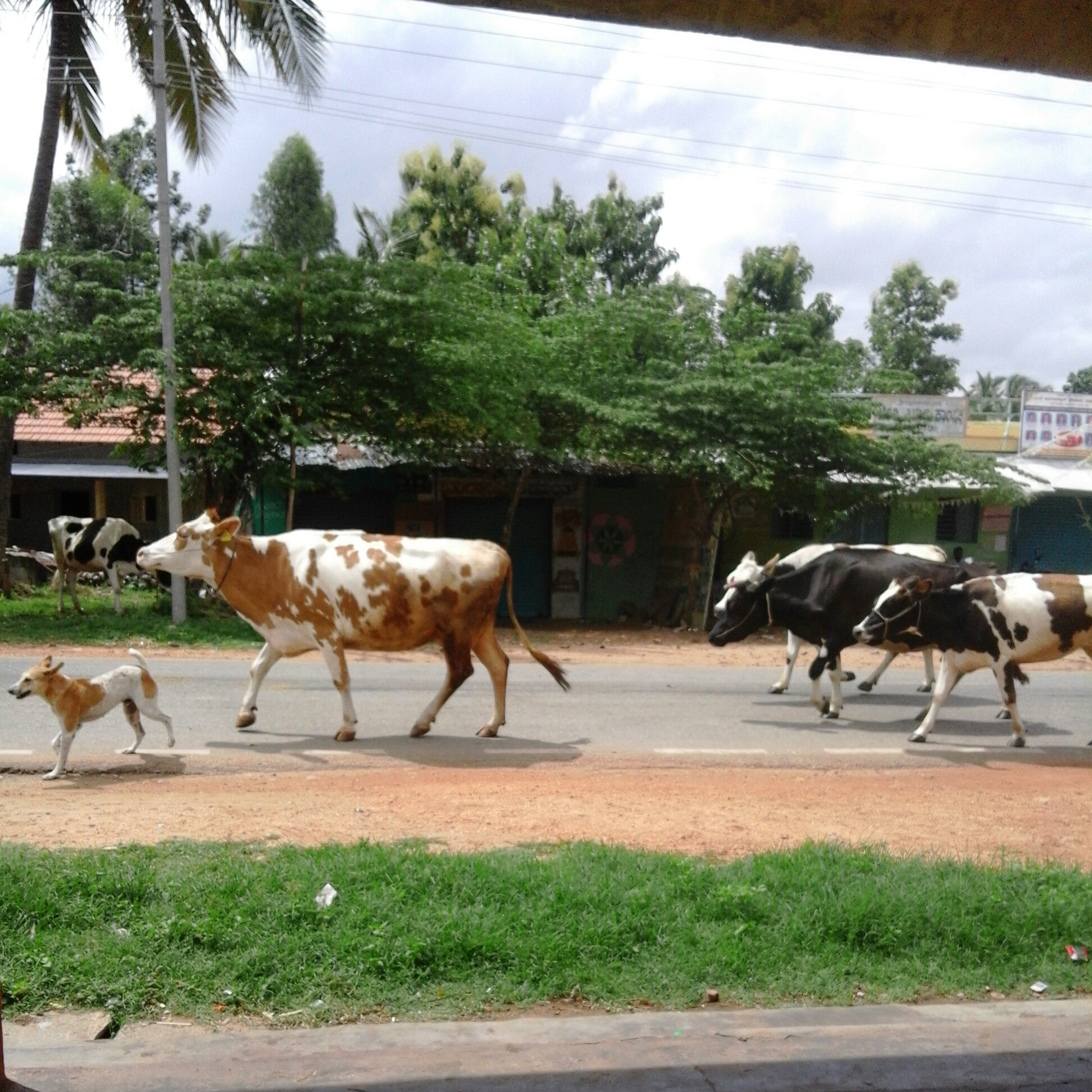
Mahadevapura bus stand

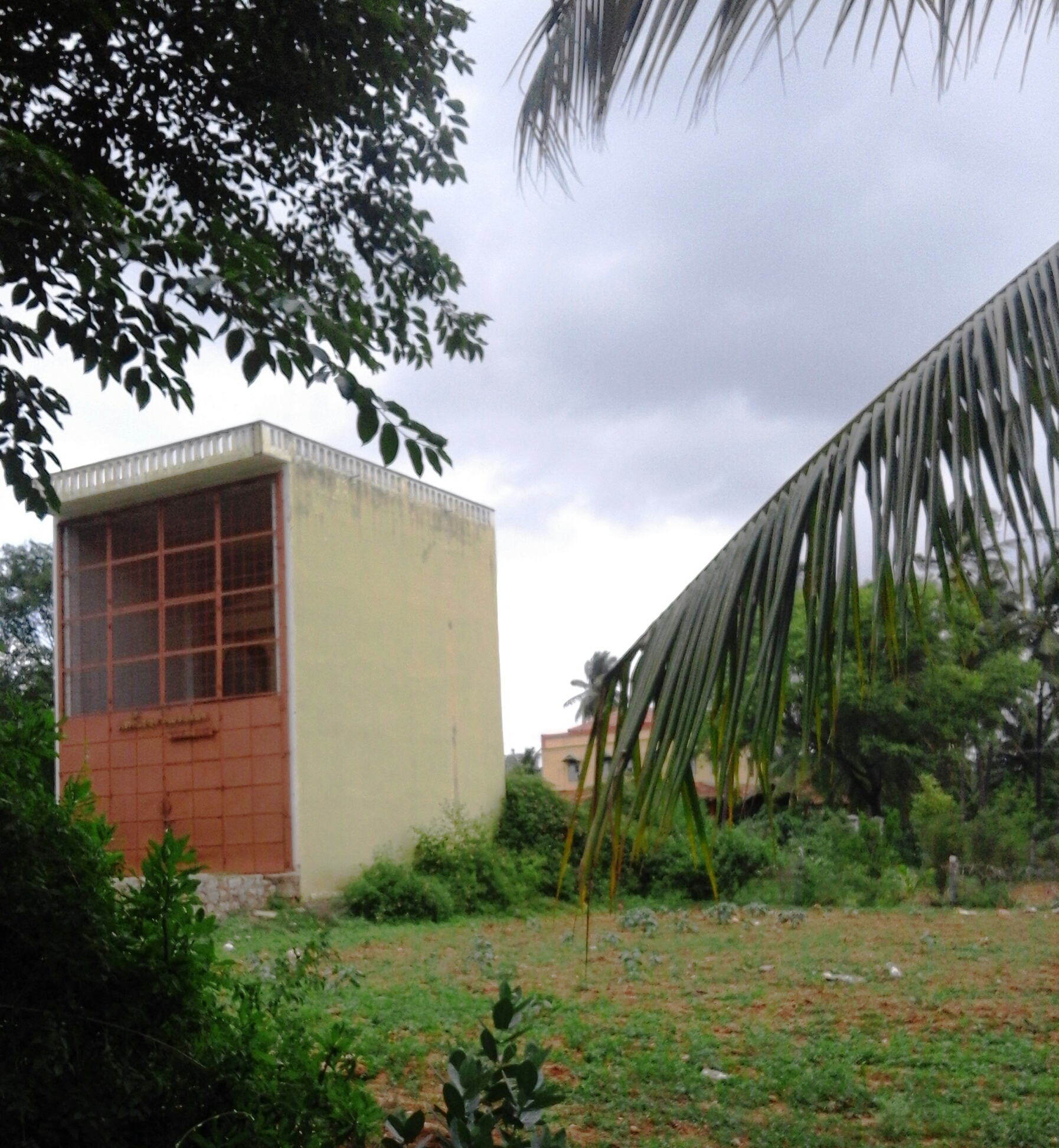
Chariot shed

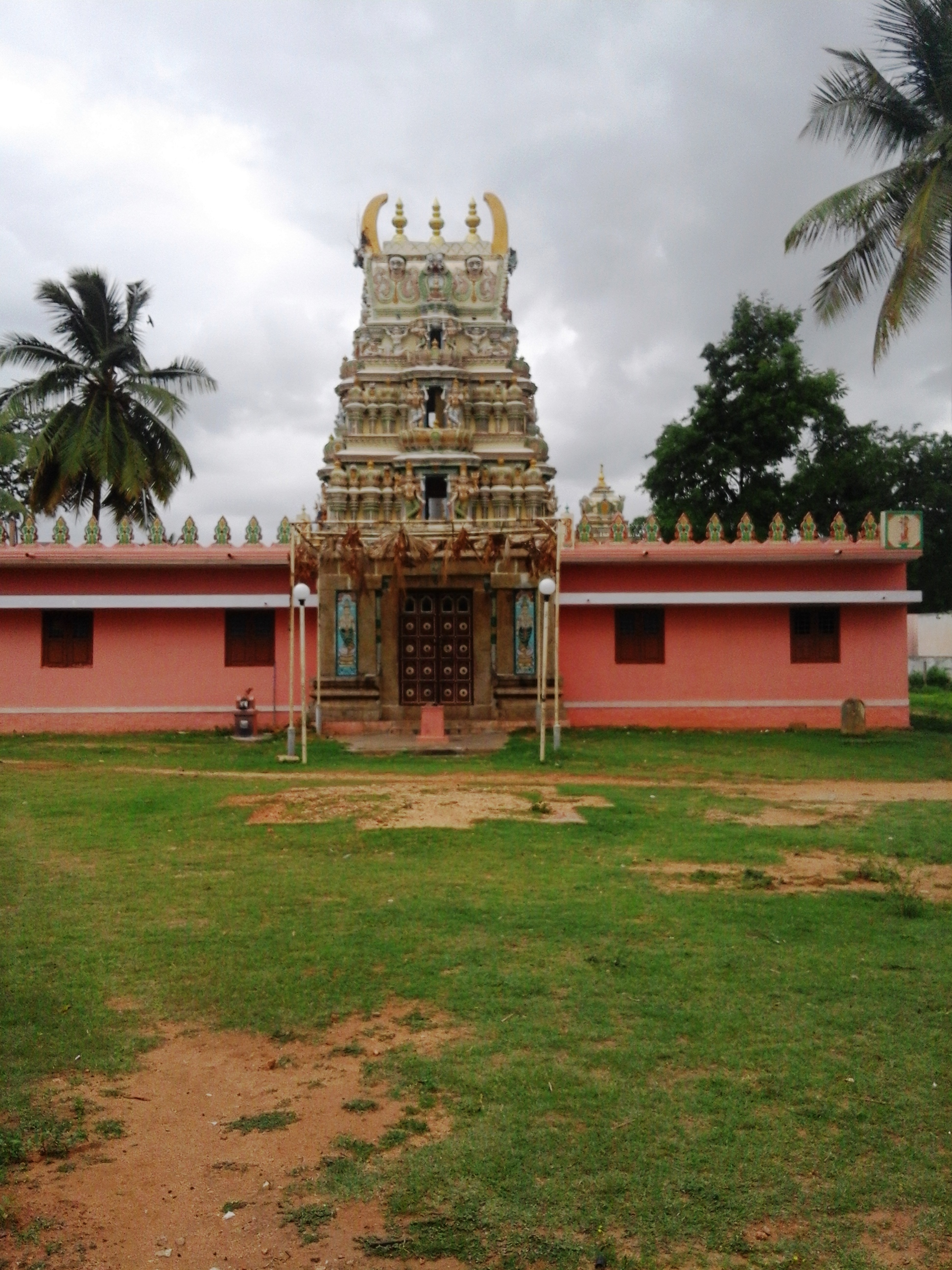
Temple in Mahadevpura

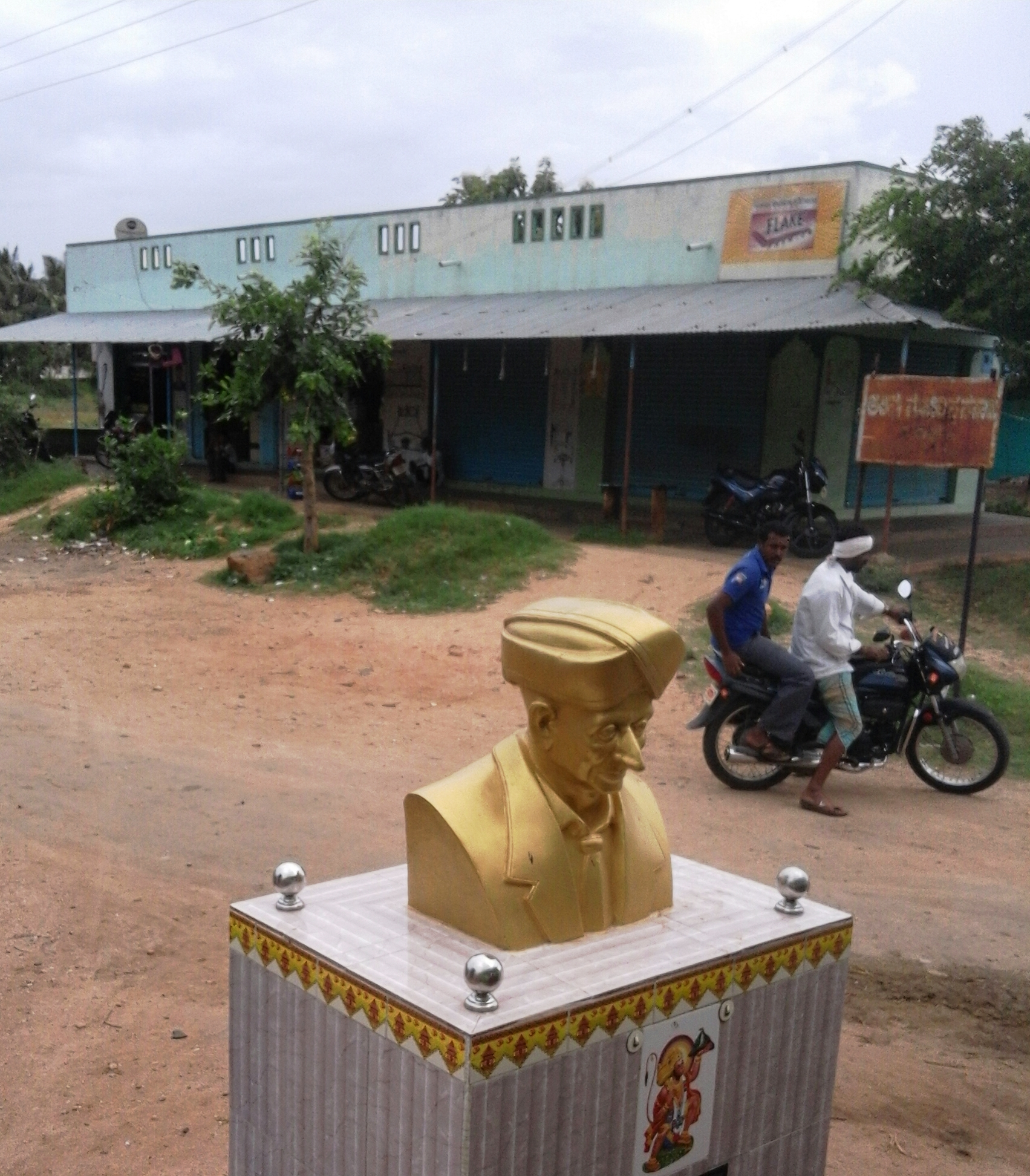
Village scene

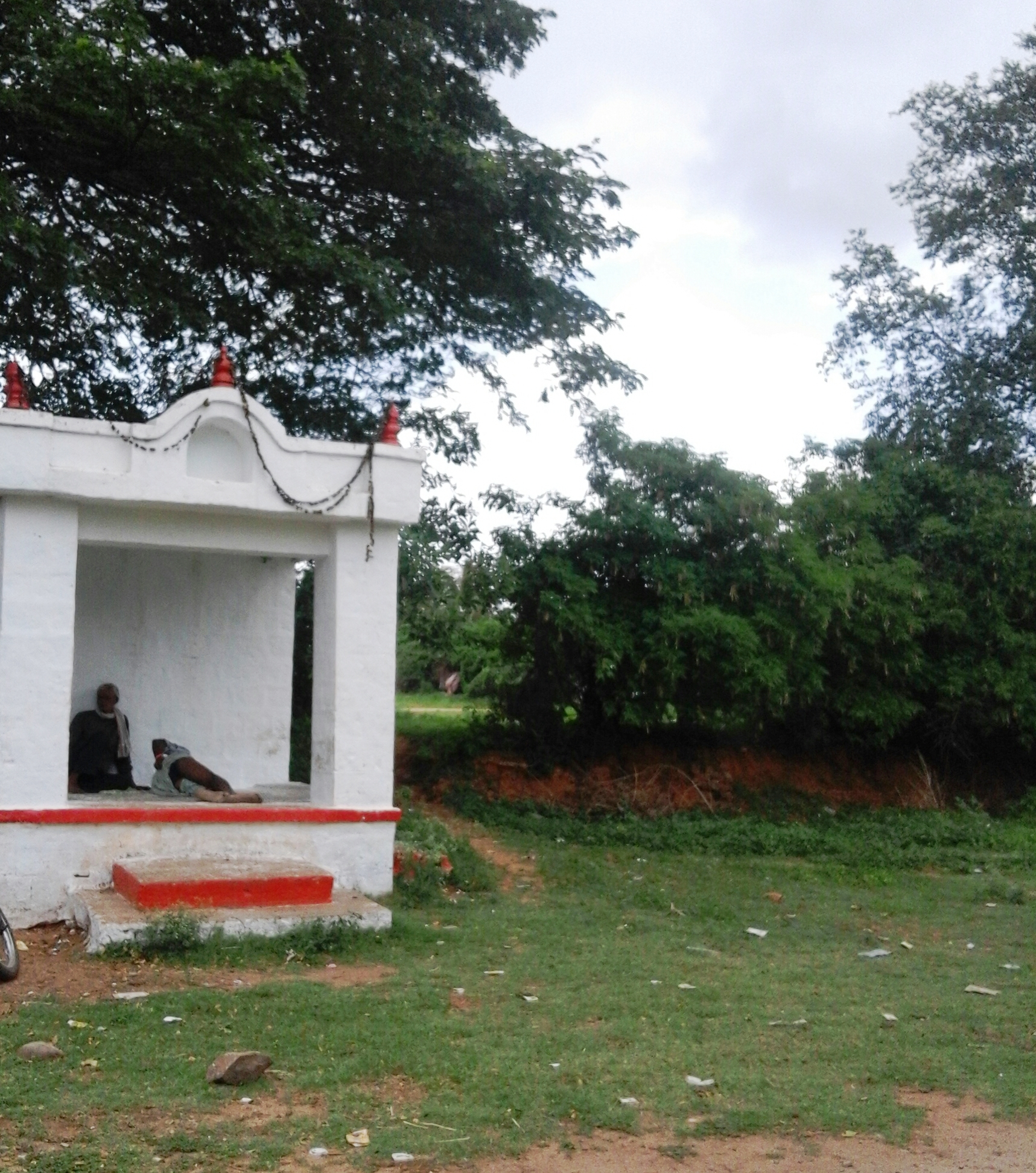
Village seat

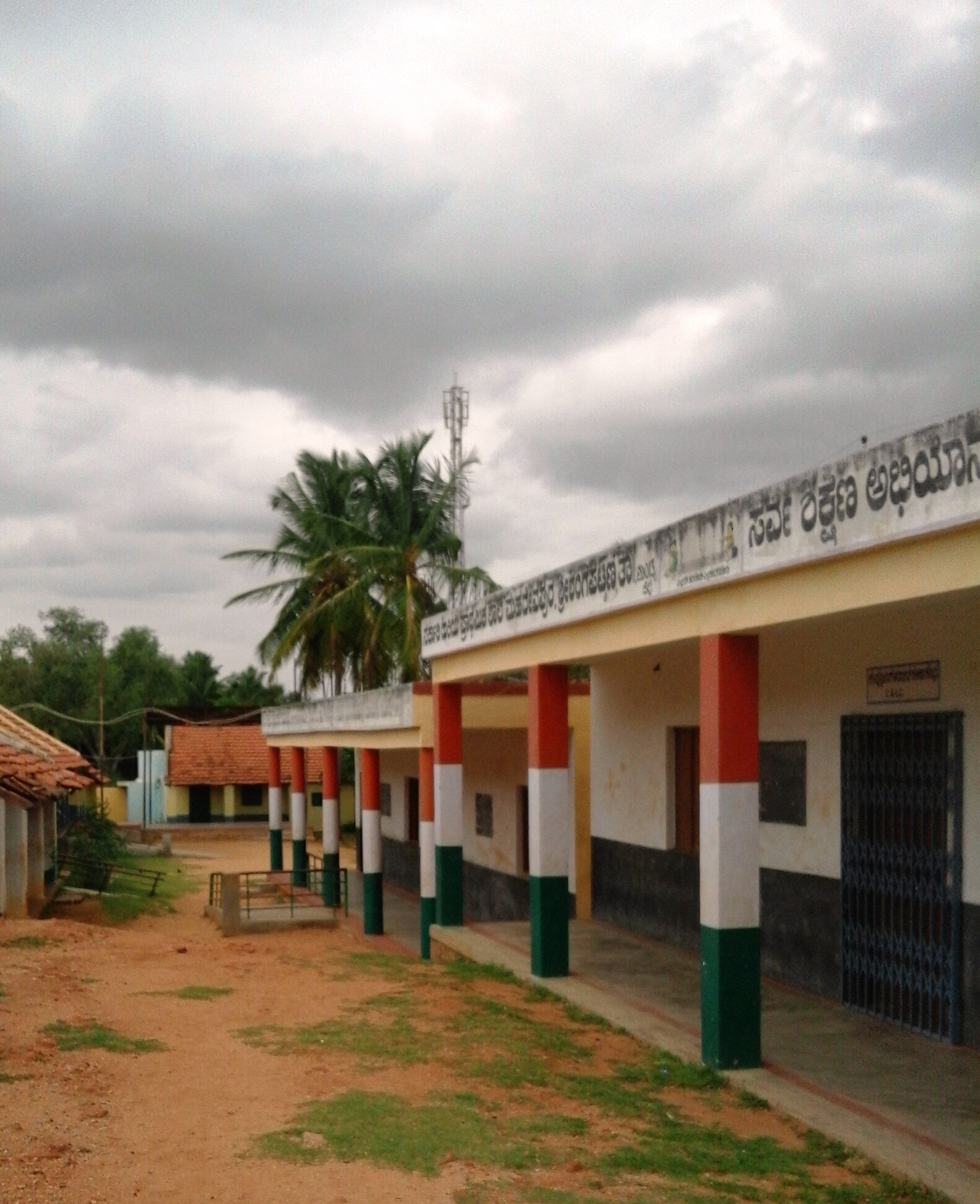
Primary school
