= Administrative Training Institute, Mysore =

Training institute in Mysore, India

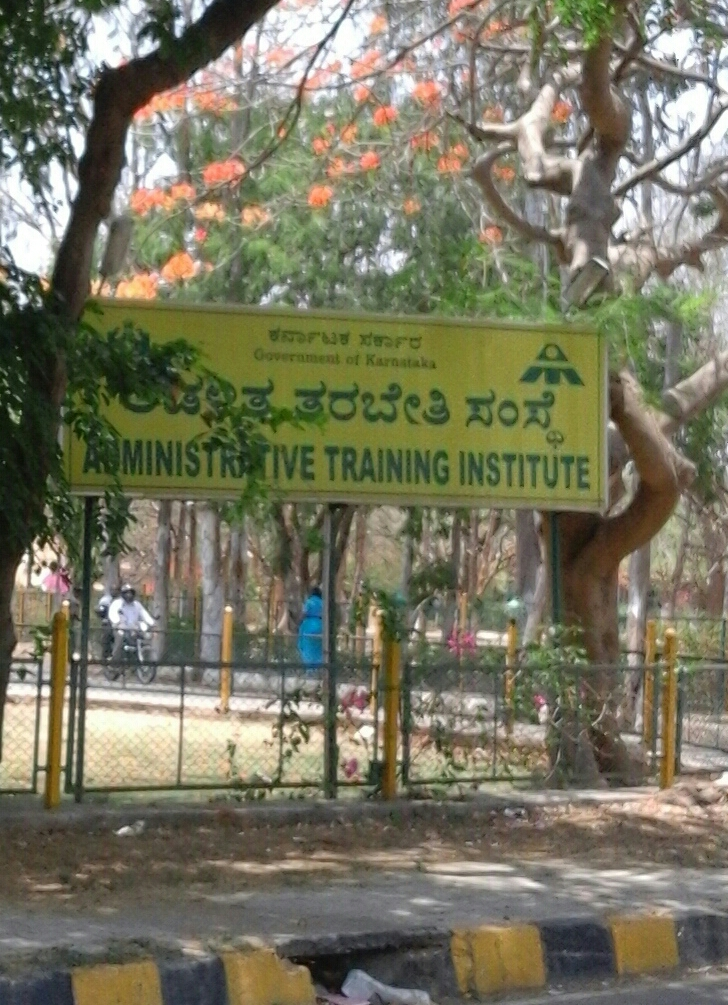
- Type: Public
- Location: Mysore, Karnataka, India
- Website: Website

Administrative Training Institute, Mysore is a major federally funded training organization of the government of Karnataka located in Mysore, India.

From 2002 to 2006, Anita Kaul was the director general of the institute.

== Facilities ==
ATI, Mysore has a campus of 35 acres on the foothills of Chamundi hills near the Karanji lake. The State Institute for Urban Development is inside the same campus. ATI is the apex training organization of the provincial government. Being a nationally important and prestigious organization, ATI Mysore also conducts training for federal officers of IAS, IPS and IFS cadres. ATI Mysore has an auditorium that can accommodate 70 trainees.

== SIRD Mysore ==
Abdul Nasir Sab State Institute of Rural Development or A.N.S.S.I.R.D. is a campus inside ATI, Mysore funded by the Government of Karnataka. This second organization gives training to local body employees.

== ATI Library ==
The library inside the campus has 55,000 government records and other study material.

== Hostels ==
ATI Mysore has hostel facility for 165 trainees.

== See also ==
- Mysore East
