= Raghavendra Nagar =

Suburb in Karnataka, India

Coordinates: 12.313419°N 76.690161°E

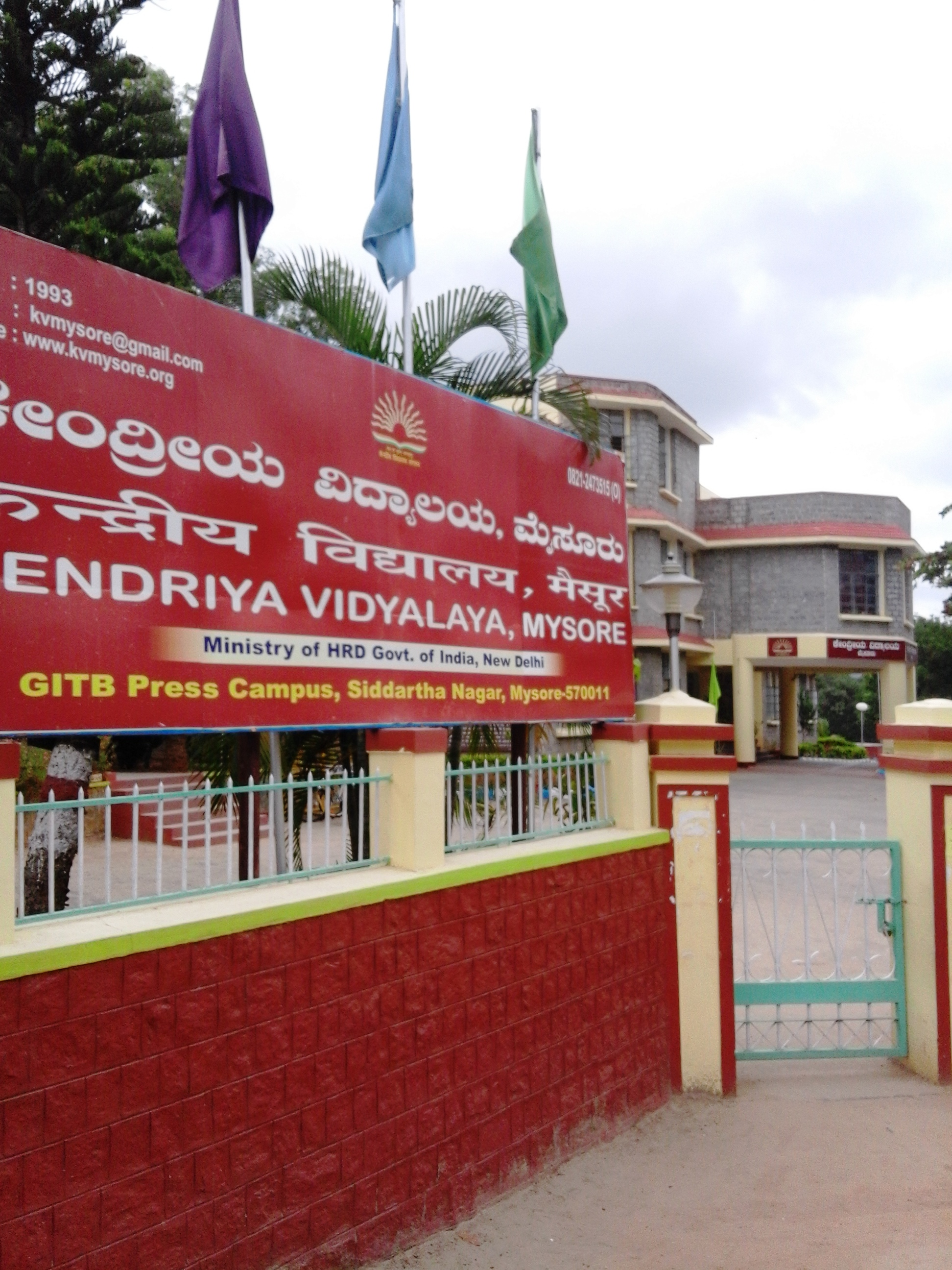
A picture of PM SHRI Kendriya Vidyalaya at Raghavendra Nagar, Mysuru

Raghavendra Nagar (IPA: raːɡʱaʋeːn̪d̪ra n̪agara) is a suburb of Mysuru in Karnataka, a state of India.

== Location ==
Raghavendra Nagar is located on the eastern side of Mysore city. It is an important residential locality. Various religious centres such as Ayyappa Temple, Sri Raghavendra Swamy Temple, Bethel Arunodaya Yesu Church and Sri Bettada Maramma Temple is situated here. Many Government offices, General stores and Schools are present nearby.

== Post office ==
There is a post office at Raghavendra Nagar and the pin code is 570011.

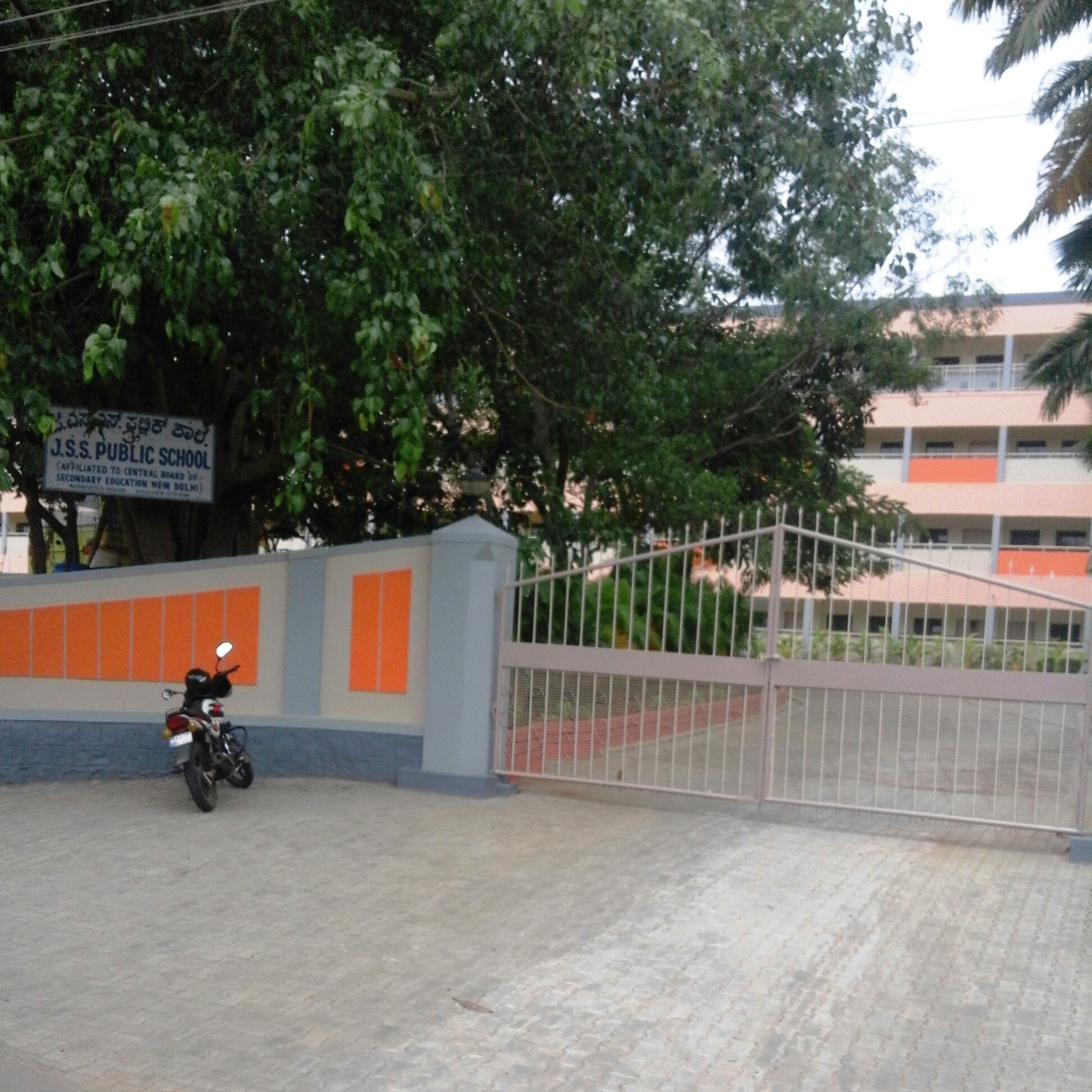
JSS School, Sidharthanagar

== Important landmarks ==
- Urban Primary Health Centre
- PM SHRI Kendriya Vidyalaya Mysuru
- Dr. Sathyanarayana Hospital
- Government High School
- KVS Zonal Institute of Education & Training
- Shri Bettada Maramma Temple
- Shubhodaya Hospital
- Bhagya Jyothi School

== Educational Institutions ==
- PM SHRI Kendriya Vidyalaya, Mysore
- Bhagya Jyothi School
- Government High School
- JSS School
- Leads Nursery
- Leads Play Home

== See also ==
- Mysore East
- Kalyanagiri
