= Kalyanagiri =

Coordinates: 12.325189°N 76.688914°E

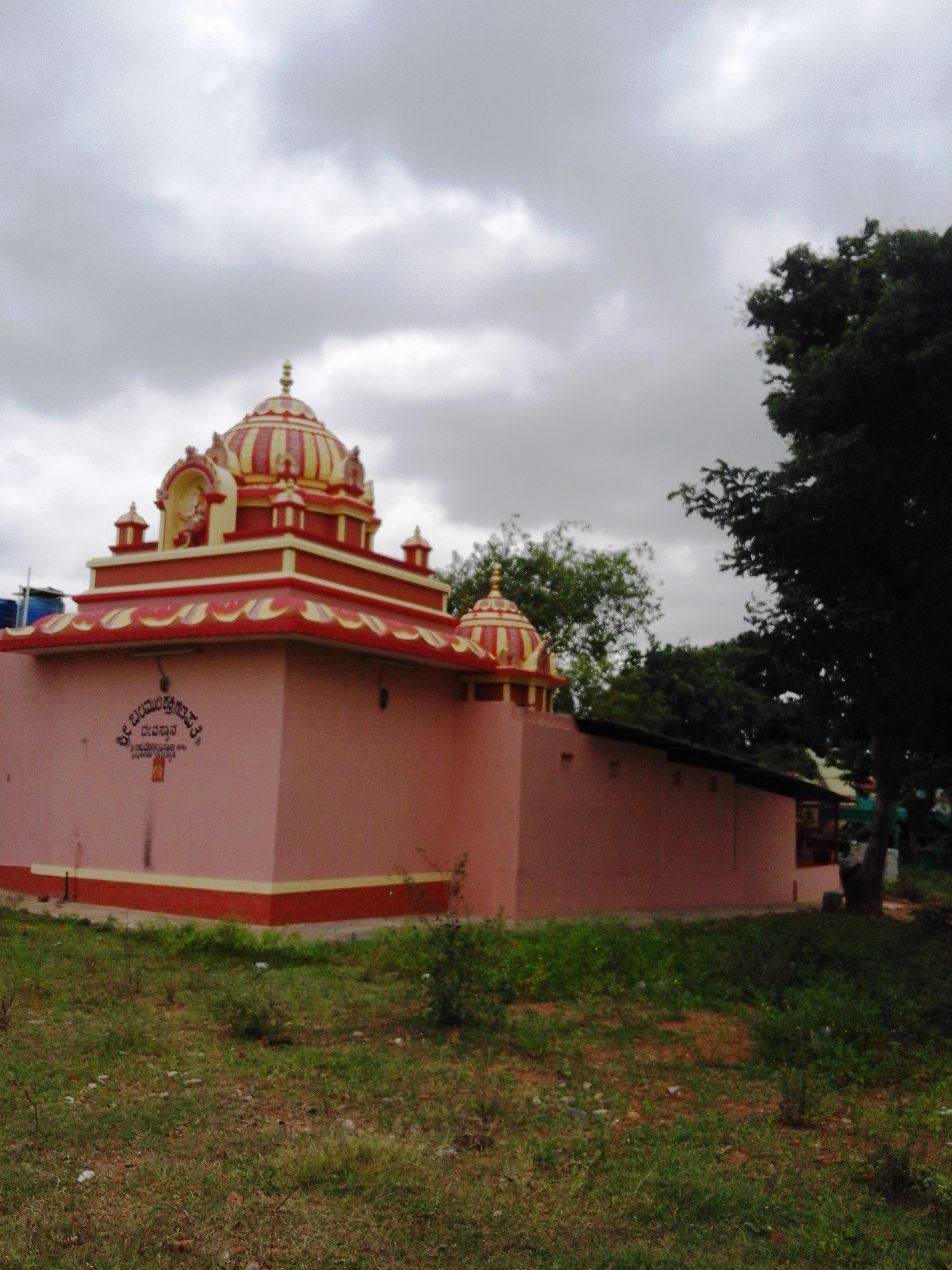
A Temple next to Dr. Rajkumar Road in Kalyanagiri

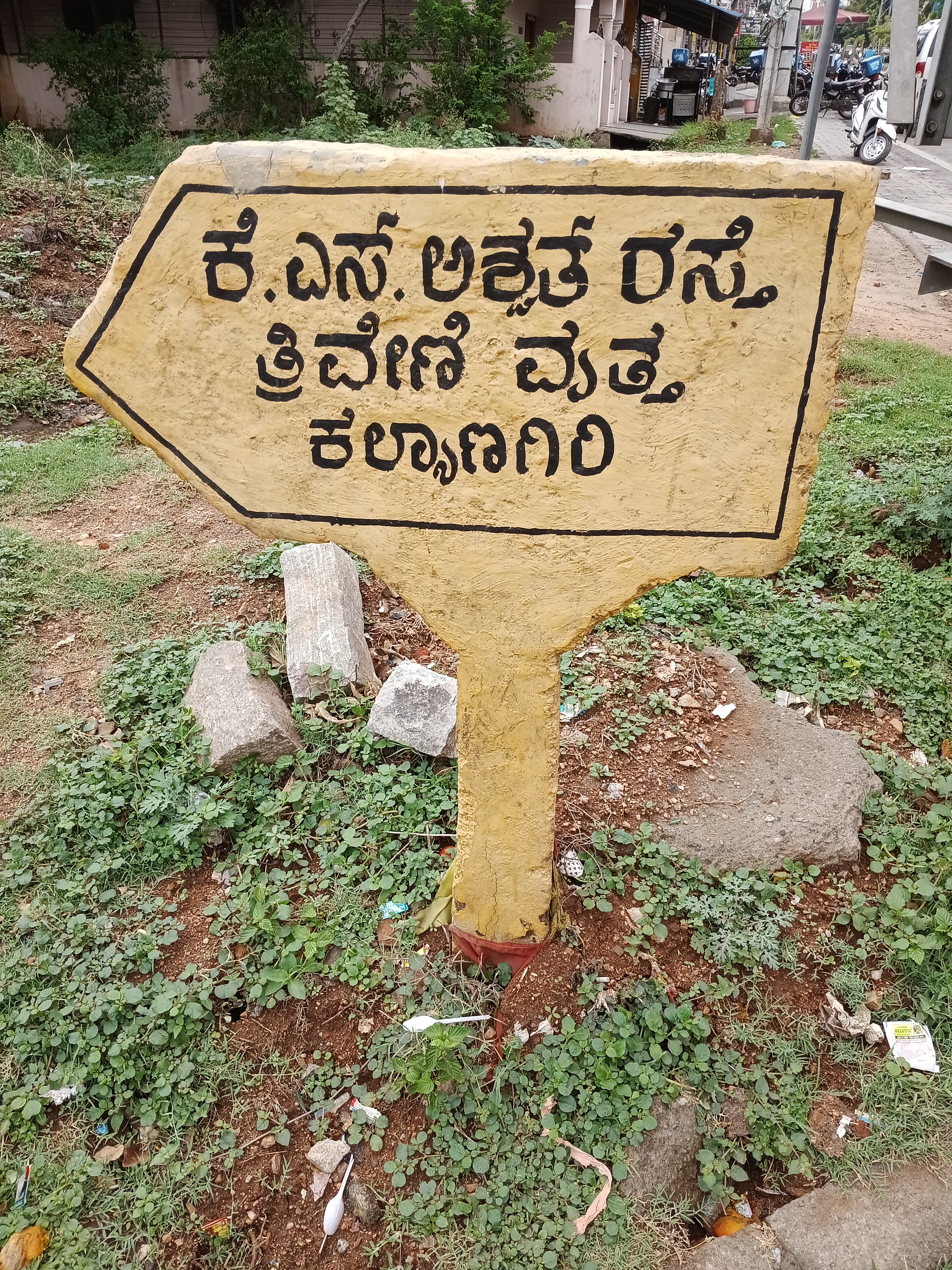
A stone signboard in Kalyanagiri

Kalyanagiri (Kannada: ಕಲ್ಯಾಣಗಿರಿ, pronounced [kal̪jaːɳagiri] in IPA) is a suburb of Mysuru in Karnataka which in turn is a state of India.

== Location ==
Kalyanagiri is located on the eastern side of Mysore city.

== Demographics ==
Kalyanagiri is a predominantly Muslim area with many mosques around. The Hindu population is also sizeable.

== See also ==
- Mysore East
- Raghavendra Nagar
