= State Highway 122 (Rajasthan) =

State Highway in Rajasthan, India

State Highway 122
- State Highway 122 in Red on India map

Route information
- Part of NH 552
- Maintained by Public Works Department, Rajasthan
- Length: 158 km (98 mi)

Major junctions
- West end: NH 52 in Baroni
- East end: NH 23 at Kurgaon

Location
- Country: India
- State: Rajasthan
- Districts: Rajasthan: Tonk district, Sawai Madhopur district and Karauli district
- Primary destinations: Baroni, Shiwar, Sarsop, Encher, Bageena, Adalwara Kalan, Sawai Madhopur, Bhoori Pahari, Haroti, Sapotra, Kurgaon

Highway system
- Roads in India; Expressways; National; State; Asian; State Highways in Rajasthan
← SH 121	→ SH 123

State Highway 122 (RJ SH 122, SH-122) is a State Highway in Rajasthan state of India that connects Baroni in Tonk district of Rajasthan with Kurgaon in Karauli district of Rajasthan. The total length of RJ SH 122 is 158 km.

State Highway 122 has been made by upgrading Major District Road 111. This highway connects NH 52 in Baroni to NH 23 in Kurgaon.

== Route ==
SH122 connects Shiwar, Sarsop, Encher and Sawai Madhopur in the state of Rajasthan.

== Junctions ==
NH 52 Terminal near Baroni.
NH 552 near Sawai Madhopur.
NH 23 Terminal near Kurgaon.
