= Chauth Ka Barwara Tehsil =

- Tehsil
- Country: India
- State: Rajasthan
- District: Sawai Madhopur
- Headquarters: Chauth Ka Barwara
- Villages: List: Abhaipura; Adalwara Kalan; Adalwara Khurd; Andholi; Bageena; Balriya; Banderiya; Banjari; Bansla; Bansra; Bhagwatgarh; Bhedola; Bhedoli; Borda; Chainpura; Chaukri; Chauth Ka Barwara; Deoli; Deopura; Dholi; Didayach; Ekra; Encher; Ganeshganj; Gardwas; Girdharpura; Gopalpura; Gunseela; Isarda; Jagmoda; Jajera; Jharoda; Jhonpra; Jola; Kachhipura; Kanwarpura; Kawad; Kumhariya; Mahapura; Manpur; Murli Manoharpura; Nahri Kalan; Nahri Khurd With Jharkund; Nayagaon; Paondera; Peeplya; Raipur; Rajwana; Ramsinghpura; Ratanpura; Rewatpura; Roopnagar; Samundrapura; Sarsop; Sawai Ganj; Shersinghpura; Shiwar; Sirohi; Solpur; Tapur; Teendoo; Thekra; Torda; Trilokpura; Vijaipura

Population (2011)
  - Total: 97,500

Demographics
  - Literacy: 61.73
  - Sex ratio: 926

Chauth Ka Barwara Tehsil is one of the seven Tehsils of Sawai Madhopur District, Rajasthan state, India.
