= Sawai Madhopur District Council =

Type
- Type: District Council of Sawai Madhopur
- Term limits: 5 years

Leadership
- Zila Pramukh: TBD
- Deputy Zila Pramukh: TBD

Structure
- Seats: 31
- Political groups: Government (26): INC (26); Opposition (5): BJP (4); IND (1)

Elections
- Voting system: First-past-the-post
- Last election: 14 November 2026
- Next election: 2031

Sawai Madhopur District Council is the district-level local government body of Sawai Madhopur district in Rajasthan, India. It is officially known as Sawai Madhopur Zila Parishad and forms part of the state's three-tier Panchayati raj system.

== Zila Parishad Ward Members ==
=== 2026 Zila Parishad Ward Members ===
Zila Pramukh: TBD
Deputy Zila Pramukh: TBD
Area	Ward No.	Zila Parishad member	Party	Remarks
Bamanwas	1	Ramnari	Indian National Congress	
Bamanwas	2	Satish Kumar Nagar	Indian National Congress	
Bamanwas	3	Kaluram Gurjar	Bhartiya Janata Party	
Bamanwas	4	Kunji Lal	Indian National Congress	
Bamanwas	5	Shivcharan	Indian National Congress	
Bonli	6	Ramnari Devi	Indian National Congress	
Bonli	7	Kailashi	Indian National Congress	
Bonli	8	Dhara Singh	Bhartiya Janata Party	
Bonli	9	Sonu Devi	Indian National Congress	
Chauth Ka Barwara	10	Vandana	Indian National Congress	
Chauth Ka Barwara	11	Sayer	Indian National Congress	
Chauth Ka Barwara	12	Santo	Indian National Congress	
Chauth Ka Barwara	13	Rambhajan	Indian National Congress	
Khandar	14	Chataru Lal Meena	Indian National Congress	
Khandar	15	Asha Devi	Indian National Congress	
Khandar	16	Rajjo Devi	Indian National Congress	
Khandar	17	Roopnarayan	Indian National Congress	
Khandar	18	Devi Lal	Indian National Congress	
Sawai Madhopur	19	Anita Meena	Indian National Congress	
Sawai Madhopur	20	Ashok Raj Meena	Bhartiya Janata Party	
Sawai Madhopur	21	Santosh Devi	Indian National Congress	
Sawai Madhopur	22	Filma Bai	Indian National Congress	
Malarna Dungar	23	Seema Meena	Indian National Congress	
Malarna Dungar	24	Jasmine Bano	Indian National Congress	
Malarna Dungar	25	Jayprakash	Independent politician	
Gangapur City	26	Mukesh	Indian National Congress	
Gangapur City	27	Pooja Bai	Indian National Congress	
Gangapur City	28	Girraj	Indian National Congress	
Wazirpur	29	Pinki	Bhartiya Janata party	
Wazirpur	30	Farebi Singh	Indian National Congress	
Wazirpur	31	Ganga	Indian National Congress	

=== 2021 Zila Parishad Ward Members ===
Zila Parishad Members - Sawai Madhopur 2021
Party	Candidate	Votes	%	±%
BJP	Babudi			
INC	Foranti Devi			
INC	Mamta			
BJP	Beena Devi			
INC	Babulal			
BJP	Bharti Gujjar			
INC	Sana Parvin			
INC	Sunita			
INC	Kailashi			
BJP	Satyaprakash Gujjar			
INC	Sudama			
INC	Mamta			
INC	Babulal			
BJP	Premprakash			
INC	Dhanpal			
INC	Prm Devi			
INC	Ashok			
INC	Seema Devi			
BJP	Rajni			
INC	Gajanand			
BJP	Rampati			
Independent	Pukhraj			
BJP	Chote Lal			
INC	Hardayal Jatav			
INC	Raj Bai			

== Structure ==
The following is the administrative structure of Sawai Madhopur Zila Parishad, including its Panchayat Samitis and Gram Panchayats.

- Sawai Madhopur Zila Parishad
  - Bamanwas Panchayat Samiti
  - Bonli Panchayat Samiti
  - Chauth Ka Barwara Panchayat Samiti
    - Adalwara Kalan Gram Panchayat
    - Encher Gram Panchayat
    - Bagina Gram Panchayat
    - Balriya Gram Panchayat
    - Bhagwatgarh Gram Panchayat
    - Bhedola Gram Panchayat
    - Binjari Gram Panchayat
    - Chauth Ka Barwara Gram Panchayat
    - Deka Gram Panchayat
    - Didayach Gram Panchayat
    - Isarda Gram Panchayat
    - Jhonpra Gram Panchayat
    - Jola Gram Panchayat
    - Khijoori Gram Panchayat
    - Kustla Gram Panchayat
    - Mahapura Gram Panchayat
    - Kumhariya Gram Panchayat
    - Mui Gram Panchayat
    - Neemli Kalan Juwad Gram Panchayat
    - Pancholas Gram Panchayat
    - Pavdera Gram Panchayat
    - Rajwana Gram Panchayat
    - Rawanjna Chaur Gram Panchayat
    - Rawanjna Doongar Gram Panchayat
    - Sarsop Gram Panchayat
    - Shiwar Gram Panchayat
    - Tapur Gram Panchayat
  - Gangapur City Panchayat Samiti
  - Khandar Panchayat Samiti
  - Malarna Dungar Panchayat Samiti
  - Sawai Madhopur Panchayat Samiti
  - Wazirpur Panchayat Samiti
