= Chauth Ka Barwara Panchayat Samiti =

Panchayat Samiti in Rajasthan, India

Type
- Type: Block Council of Chauth Ka Barwara
- Term limits: 5 years

Leadership
- Pradhan: TBD
- Deputy Pradhan: TBD

Structure
- Seats: 21
- Political groups: Government (14): INC (14); Opposition (7): BJP (3); BSP (2); IND (2)

Elections
- Voting system: First-past-the-post
- Last election: 14 November 2026
- Next election: 2031

Chauth Ka Barwara Panchayat Samiti is a Panchayat Samiti in the Sawai Madhopur District Council (Zila Parishad) of Sawai Madhopur district, Rajasthan, India. It is the intermediate tier of the Panchayati Raj system between the district-level Zila Parishad and the Gram Panchayats. Its headquarters are at Chauth Ka Barwara. The Panchayat Samiti has the Local Government Directory (LGD) code 262680. The Ministry of Panchayati Raj's current village-wise record lists 23 gram panchayats under the Panchayat Samiti.

== History ==
=== Formation ===
The proposal to establish Chauth Ka Barwara as a new Panchayat Samiti was approved by the Government of Rajasthan in 2014. The proposed Panchayat Samiti was to comprise 23 Gram Panchayats, of which 19 were to be transferred from Sawai Madhopur Panchayat Samiti and four from Khandar Panchayat Samiti. The proposed Panchayat Samiti had a population of 135,405, and objections to the proposal were invited from local residents until 11 September 2014.

The 19 Gram Panchayats proposed to be transferred from Sawai Madhopur were Adalwara, Balriya, Binjari, Bhagwatgarh, Bhedola, Chauth Ka Barwara, Didayach, Isarda, Jhopra, Jola, Mahapura, Pavdera, Rajwana, Sarsop, Shiwar, Tapur, Deka, Kustla and Mui. The four Gram Panchayats proposed to be transferred from Khandar were Khijuri, Pancholas, Rawanjna Doongar and Rawanjna Chaur.

The proposal also involved the reorganisation and creation of Gram Panchayats. Mui and Rawanjna Chaur were described as reorganised Gram Panchayats, while Rawanjna Doongar was proposed as a new Gram Panchayat to be included in the new Panchayat Samiti.

Chauth Ka Barwara was granted Panchayat Samiti status in 2015. The Panchayat Samiti began functioning with the 23 Gram Panchayats included in the approved administrative structure. The first Block Development Officer, Subedar Singh, assumed office on 5 February 2015.

=== Early administrative period ===
During its early years, the Panchayat Samiti operated from an alternative office in the southern premises of a higher secondary school. Contemporary reporting also documented frequent changes in the post of Block Development Officer during the Panchayat Samiti's first years.

The initial administrative arrangement remained based on the 23 Gram Panchayats transferred from the Sawai Madhopur and Khandar Panchayat Samitis. This 23-Gram-Panchayat structure is also reflected in government records from the 2020s, which identify Chauth Ka Barwara as a Panchayat Samiti and list Gram Panchayats under it with their local government codes.

=== Reorganisation of Gram Panchayats ===
In 2025, the Government of Rajasthan undertook a statewide reorganisation, delimitation and creation of Gram Panchayats. The process also affected the Gram Panchayats within Chauth Ka Barwara Panchayat Samiti.

Four new Gram Panchayats were created in the Chauth Ka Barwara Panchayat Samiti area during the 2025 reorganisation: Aicher, Bagina, Kumhariya and Neemli Kalan-Juwad. The reorganisation also defined the villages forming part of these new Gram Panchayats. Aicher included Aicher, Abhaypura and Samudrapura; Bagina included Bagina and Bandedya; Kumhariya included Kumhariya, Jajeda, Ratanpura and Kanwarpura; and Neemli Kalan-Juwad included Juwad, Vijaypura, Neemli Kalan and Arampura.

=== Administrative structure after the 2025 reorganisation ===
The four newly created Gram Panchayats were subsequently included in the Panchayat Samiti's 2026 administrative and electoral records. The 2026 list contains 27 Gram Panchayats in the Chauth Ka Barwara Panchayat Samiti area, compared with the 23-Gram-Panchayat structure that existed before the 2025 reorganisation.

== Panchayat Samiti Sadasy ==
=== 2026 ===
Elected members of Chauth Ka Barwara Panchayat Samiti (2026)
Area	Ward no.	Panchayat Samiti member	Party
Shiwar	1	Mevish	INC
Isarda	2	Raji	INC
	3	Pooja Bairva	INC
	4	Sima Bai	Independent
	5	Tikaram	INC
	6	Shankar Lal	INC
	7	Anita	INC
	8	Deshraj	INC
	9	Virmala Meena	INC
	10	Rajesh	Independent
	11	Ratna	BSP
	12	Jagdishi	INC
	13	Prem Kumar	BJP
	14	Nirmala	INC
	15	Boltaram	BSP
	16	Suraj	BJP
	17	Pyarsingh	INC
	18	Tejraj	INC
	19	Bachchhraj	INC
	20	Ramprasad	INC
Mahapura & Tapur	21	Asha	BJP

=== 2021 ===
Panchayat Samiti Sadasy Chauth Ka Barwara 2021: Chauth Ka Barwara
Party	Candidate	Votes	%	±%
INC				
BJP				
INC				
BJP				
INC				
INC				
BJP				
INC				
INC				
BJP				
INC				
INC				
BJP				
BJP				
INC				
BJP				
INC				
INC				
Independent				
INC				

== Gram Panchayat segments ==
Sr. No.	Gram Panchayats	Sarpanch
1	Adalwara Kalan	Vimal Kumar Meena
2	Balriya	Seema Meena
3	Banjari	Rambilash Gujjar
4	Bhagwatgarh	Kedar Mal Gujjar
5	Bhedola	Deepti Rajawat
6	Chauth Ka Barwara	Sita Devi
7	Dahakwa	Kailash Chand Meena
8	Didayach	Hansraj Bairwa
9	Isarda	Pukhraj Gujjar
10	Jhonpra	Ganga Devi Meena
11	Jola	Jai Kishan Meena
12	Khizoori	Keshanti Devi
13	Kushtala	Kishan Gopal
14	Mahapura	Chanda Devi
15	Mui	RamJi Lal
16	Pacholash	Rajesh Gujjar
17	Pavdera	Laxmi Meena
18	Rajwana	Gendi Devi
19	Rawanjna Choud	Anokhi Devi
20	Rawanjna Doongar	Suman Kiwad
21	Sarsop	Manni Devi
22	Shiwar	Prem Devi
23	Tapur	Tara Devi

== Gram panchayats ==
The Panchayat Samiti comprises the following gram panchayats:

No.	Gram panchayat	Gram panchayat code
1	Adalwada Kalan	41472
2	Aicher	
3	Bagina	
4	Baleria	
5	Bhagwatgarh	41478
6	Bhadora	41479
7	Binjari	41480
8	Chauth Ka Barwara	41482
9	Deka	
10	Didayach	41485
11	Isarda	41488
12	Jhopra	41492
13	Jola	41493
14	Khijoori	41456
15	Kustla	41498
16	Mahapura	41500
17	Kumhariya	
18	Mui	41503
19	Neemli Kalan Juwad	
20	Pancholas	41464
21	Pawadera	41507
22	Rajwana	41508
23	Khawanja Chaur	
24	Khawanja Doongar	
25	Sarsoop	41511
26	Shivad	41514
27	Tapur	41518
