= Gokulpur =

- Village
- Location in Rajasthan, India Gokulpur (India)
- Coordinates: 25.9894°N 76.6902°E
- Country: India
- State: Rajasthan
- District: Sawai Madhopur

Languages
- Time zone: UTC+5:30 (IST)
- Climate: Normal (Köppen)

Gokulpur is a village in the Khandar tehsil of the Sawai Madhopur in Rajasthan, India. It is 60 km from district headquarters. As of 2013 it had a population of 375.

The nearest post office is in Khandar. Its Pin code is 322025.

The main occupation for the people of Gokulpur is agriculture.

The nearest river is the Banas River.
