= Isarda Dam =

- Location within Rajasthan Location within India
- Interactive map of Isarda Dam
- Official name: ईसरदा बांध
- Country: India
- Location: Isarda, Rajasthan
- Coordinates: 26.1105°N 76.0076°E

The Isarda Dam is located in the-Tonk district in the Indian state of Rajasthan, on the banks of the Banas River in between the villages of Isarda(Sawai Madhopur District) and Banetha(Tonk District).

While the name is officially Isarda Dam but the project is located in Tonk District.

This dam is constructed on Banas river, 75 km away from Bisalpur dam. With a total capacity of 10.77 TMS, 3.5 TMC water will be used for drinking supply only. Dam height will be of 262 meters. It will have 26 gates in it.

== Drinking Water ==
isarda Dam will provide drinking water in the second phase of project to 2547 villages and 11 towns. It includes 1118 villages and 4 towns of Alwar district and remaining 1429 villages and 60 towns are included in Jaipur district.

In total project drinking water will be supplied to six towns and 1,256 villages of Dausa and Sawai Madhopur districts.

SPML Infra has received a new bulk water supply project order from Public Health Engineering Department, Tonk, Rajasthan under the flagship scheme of Jal Jeevan Mission.

== See also ==
Dheel Dam
