= Isarda railway station =

Railway station in Rajasthan, India

Isarda

General information
- Location: Isarda, Sawai Madhopur district, Rajasthan; India
- Coordinates: 26.170186°N 76.030506°E
- Elevation: 271 metres (889 ft)
- System: Indian Railways station
- Owner: Indian Railways
- Operator: North Western Railway
- Line: Jaipur–Sawai Madhopur railway line
- Platforms: 2
- Tracks: 2

Construction
- Structure type: Standard (on ground station)
- Parking: Yes

Other information
- Status: Functioning
- Station code: ISA
- Zone(s): North Western Railway
- Division(s): Jaipur
Location
- Location within India Location within Rajasthan

Isarda railway station is a railway station in Sawai Madhopur district, Rajasthan. Its code is ISA. It serves Isarda. The station consists of 2 platforms. Passenger, Express and Superfast trains halt here.
