= Todra =

- Census town
- Location in Rajasthan, India Todra (India)
- Coordinates: 25.8571°N 76.358°E
- Country: India
- State: Rajasthan
- District: Sawai Madhopur

Population (2001)
  - Total: 5,245

Languages
  - Official: Hindi
- Time zone: UTC+5:30 (IST)
- ISO 3166 code: RJ-IN

Todra is a census town in Sawai Madhopur district in the Indian state of Rajasthan.

== Demographics ==
As of 2001 India census, Todra had a population of 5245. Males constitute 51% of the population and females 49%. Todra has an average literacy rate of 58%, lower than the national average of 59.5%: male literacy is 72%, and female literacy is 43%. In Todra, 17% of the population is under 6 years of age.
