= MLZ =

MLZ or mlz may refer to:

- Cerro Largo International Airport (IATA: MLZ), Melo, Uruguay
- Malarna railway station (Indian Railways station code: MLZ), Rajasthan, India
- Malaynon language (ISO 639-3: mlz), a Filipino Australian language
