= Bonli =

Bonli बौंली
- City
- Location in Rajasthan, India Bonli (India)
- Coordinates: 26.329°N 76.220°E
- Country: India
- State: Rajasthan
- District: Sawai Madhopur
- Sub-division: Bonli

Government
  - Type: Municipality
  - Body: Bonli Municipality

Population (2011)
  - Total: 15,300

Languages
  - Official: Hindi
  - Native: Dhundhari, Meenawati
- Time zone: UTC+5:30 (IST)
- PIN: 322023
- Telephone code: 07466
- Vehicle registration: RJ-25
- Website: sawaimadhopur.rajasthan.gov.in

Bonli is a prominent town and a tehsil headquarters in the Sawai Madhopur district of the Indian state of Rajasthan. Located in the eastern part of the state, it serves as a significant administrative and commercial hub for the surrounding rural areas.

== Administration and politics ==
Bonli is a Tehsil and Panchayat Samiti Headquarter. Administratively, it falls under the Sawai Madhopur district.

Politically, the town is part of the Bamanwas Assembly Constituency (Vidhan Sabha) and the Tonk-Sawai Madhopur Parliamentary Constituency (Lok Sabha). The local governance is managed through a Gram Panchayat system, though it functions with the infrastructure of a growing urban town.

== Geography ==
Bonli is situated at an average elevation of 240 metres (787 feet). It is strategically located on the highway connecting Lalsot and Sawai Madhopur.

Nearby Cities: Lalsot (approx. 30 km), Sawai Madhopur (approx. 40 km), Niwai (approx. 45 km).

Climate: The region experiences a semi-arid climate with extremely hot summers (reaching up to $45^\circ\text{C}$) and cool winters. The monsoon season occurs between July and September.

== Demographics ==
According to the 2011 Census of India, Bonli had a total population of 15,300.

Gender Ratio: 7,874 males (51.5%) and 7,426 females (48.5%).

Child Population: 2,299 (approx. 15% of the total population) are in the 0–6 age group.

Literacy: The town has a literacy rate of 73.23%, significantly higher than the Rajasthan state average of 66.11%.

  - Male literacy: 86.91%
  - Female literacy: 58.85%

The primary languages spoken are Hindi and the local Dhundhari dialect.

== Religious and cultural significance ==
Bonli is known for its local temples and traditional Rajasthani culture.

Balaji Temple: A famous temple dedicated to Lord Hanuman located on the Bonli–Lalsot Highway, attracting devotees from nearby districts.

Festivals: Like most of Rajasthan, festivals such as Diwali, Holi, Makar Sankranti, and Gangaur are celebrated with great fervor.

== Infrastructure and healthcare ==
The town serves as a medical and educational hub for the surrounding villages.

Healthcare:

  - Government Hospital, Bonli (Community Health Centre).
  - Government Ayurvedic Aushadhalya, Jhanoon.

Education: The town hosts several government and private schools offering primary and secondary education, along with colleges affiliated with the University of Rajasthan.

== Economy ==
The economy is primarily driven by:

Agriculture: Most of the surrounding rural population depends on farming (Mustard, Wheat, and Bajra).

Trade: Bonli market is a central trading point for agricultural produce and daily commodities in the region.

Stone Mining: The district is known for its stone resources, which contribute to local employment.

== Transportation ==
Road: Well-connected by Rajasthan State Road Transport Corporation (RSRTC) buses and private operators to Jaipur, Sawai Madhopur, and Lalsot.

Rail: The nearest major railway station is Sawai Madhopur (SWM).

Air: The nearest airport is Jaipur International Airport, approximately 110 km away.

== See also ==
Sawai Madhopur

Ranthambore National Park

Ranthambore Fort

Lalsot
