= Murli Manoharpura =

- Village
- Location within Rajasthan Location within India
- Coordinates: 26.143464°N 76.02255°E
- Country: India
- State: Rajasthan
- District: Sawai Madhopur

Government
  - Type: Gram panchayat
  - Body: Mahapura Gram Panchayat
  - sarpanch: Chanda Devi

Population (2011)
  - Total: 710

Demographics
  - Literacy: 48.94
  - Sex ratio: 978
  - Official: Hindi

Languages
- PIN: 322704

Murli Manoharpura village is located in Chauth ka Barwara tehsil of Sawai Madhopur district, Rajasthan, India.
