= Khandar Fort =

Fort in Sawai Madhopur, Rajasthan, India

Khandar Fort Taragarh Fort
- Fort
- Location in Rajasthan, India Khandar Fort (India)
- Coordinates: 26°1′24″N 76°36′25″E
- Country: India
- State: Rajasthan
- District: Sawai Madhopur

Languages
  - Official: Hindi
  - Other: Hindi, Harauti, Dundhani
- Time zone: UTC+5:30 (IST)
- PIN: 322025
- Telephone code: 07468
- Vehicle registration: RJ-25
- Nearest city: Sawai Madhopur
- Lok Sabha constituency: sawai madhopur-tonk
- Climate: Normal (Köppen)

Khandar Fort is an ancient fort located in Khandar Tehsil, Sawai Madhopur district, Rajasthan, India. This fort is on the boundary of Ranthambore National Park. The fort has three big entrances, but they are damaged.

== Geography ==
It is located at 26°1′24″N 76°36′25″E.

== Location ==
The fort is 40 km away from the main city.

== History ==
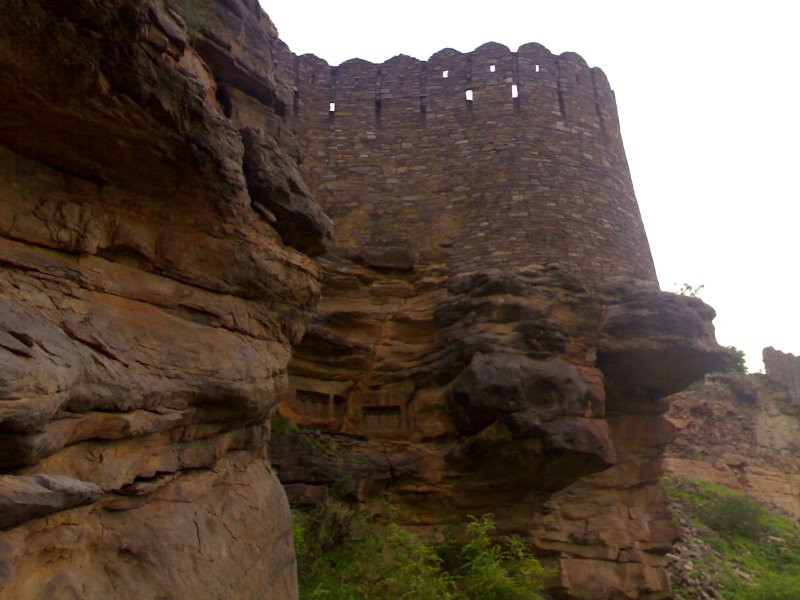
Walls of Khandar Fort

Khandar fort was built by Kshatriya Badgujar rulers. But eventually due to internal conflicts between Rajput rulers Badgujar lost its control and thus was a major setback for Badgujars. After losing their lands in fight against Kachhwaha rajputs. Badgujars migrated to neighbouring states of Madhya Pradesh, Gujarat, Maharashtra. Located on top of a strategic vertical hill, the Khandar Fort in Sawai Madhopur could never come under an easy attack and thus was truly regarded as invincible and was a favorite of many dynasties in India. It is also said that king of this fort never lost in the war. This fort also tells some historical stories by the damaged walls and gates.

The fort was long ruled by the Sisodia kings of Mewar after which it was taken over by the Mughals for a short while before coming under the direct control of the Maharajas of Jaipur in the 18th century.

This fort also belonged to Badgujar Kings and was attacked by Allaudin Khilji.

== Attractions within the Khandar Fort ==
There are seven temples within the Khandar Fort. There is an old Jain temple which displays an exquisite work of carved rock idols of Jain Gurus. There is also a Hanuman temple with a single stone idol of Lord Hanuman with a demon under its feet. The other temples at the Khandar Fort are Chaturbhuja Temple, Gobind Devji Temple, Jagatpalji Temple, and Jayanti Mata Temple. Chaturbhuja Temple houses an impressive idol of the four-armed God. An annual fair is held at the Jayanti Mata Temple. There is also the beautiful Rani Temple of the Khandar Fort located on top of the highest platform of the fort and perhaps the most magnificent part of the Fort. There are a lot of damaged sculptures here.

Other attractions at the Khandar Fort are the two huge water tanks of Ramkunda and Laxmankunda. Seven small ponds are also there but due to lack of maintenance, only four ponds are clearly visible. Tigers, leopards, and many other wild animals can be easily seen in the fort.
