= State Highway 123 (Rajasthan) =

Road in Rajasthan, India

State Highway 123

Route information
- Length: 155 km (96 mi)

Major junctions
- From: NH 552 in Bhahrowanda
- To: SH 39 at Jagner

Location
- Country: India
- State: Rajasthan
- Primary destinations: Bhahrowanda, Khandar, Baler, Karanpur, Kaila Devi, Karauli, Machalpur, Jagner(up to State Border)

Highway system
- Roads in India; Expressways; National; State; Asian; State Highways in Rajasthan
← SH 122	→ SH 124

State Highway 123 (RJ SH 123, SH 123) is a state highway in Rajasthan state of India that connects Bhahrowanda in Sawai Madhopur district of Rajasthan with Jagner in Agra district of Uttar Pradesh. The total length of SH 123 is 155 kilometres (96 mi).

SH-123 was designated by upgrading Major District Road 3. This highway connects NH 552 in Bhahrowanda to SH 39 in Jagner.
