= Sawai Madhopur Wildlife Sanctuary =

Wildlife sanctuary in Rajasthan, India

- IUCN category IV (habitat/species management area)
- Interactive map of Sawai Madhopur Wildlife Sanctuary
- Location: Sawai Madhopur district, Rajasthan, India
- Coordinates: 25.9833°N 76.3667°E
- Area: 131.30 km^{2} (50.70 sq mi)
- Established: 1955
- Governing body: Rajasthan Forest Department

Sawai Madhopur Wildlife Sanctuary is a protected wildlife sanctuary in Sawai Madhopur district in the Indian state of Rajasthan. The sanctuary is part of the larger Ranthambore landscape and is administered by the Rajasthan Forest Department. It covers an area of 131.30 km^{2} and was originally designated as a game sanctuary in 1955.

== Wildlife and habitat ==
The sanctuary lies in a semi-arid zone at the junction of the Aravalli and Vindhya hill systems. The landscape comprises dry deciduous forest, rocky outcrops, seasonal waterbodies, and grassland patches supporting large carnivores, ungulates, and diverse birdlife. The sanctuary forms part of the Ranthambore–Kailadevi–Sawai Mansingh complex and contributes to regional habitat connectivity.

Large mammals recorded in the Ranthambore landscape include Bengal tiger (Panthera tigris tigris), leopard (Panthera pardus), sloth bear (Melursus ursinus), striped hyena (Hyaena hyaena), sambar (Rusa unicolor), chital (Axis axis), nilgai (Boselaphus tragocamelus), and jackal (Canis aureus).

== Conservation and management ==
The sanctuary is managed by the Rajasthan Forest Department under state and national protected area legislation. It contributes to the Ranthambore Tiger Reserve's conservation objectives. Management actions include anti-poaching patrols, habitat protection, regulated visitor access in adjoining protected areas, and population monitoring of tigers using camera traps and surveys.

== Threats ==
Key threats to the sanctuary and the surrounding landscape include:

- Illegal mining and quarrying which is in and around the reserve, damaging habitat and increasing human disturbance.
- Large infrastructure projects and proposed reservoirs, that may submerge forest areas and fragment wildlife corridors.
- Unregulated visitor influx to temples and cultural sites, increasing disturbance inside critical habitats.

Conservation measures focus on landscape-level planning, maintaining connectivity, and regulating extractive activities.

== See also ==
- Marat Longri Wildlife Sanctuary
