= Mahapura Gram Panchayat =

Gram Panchayat in Rajasthan, India

Type
- Type: Local government
- Term limits: 5 years

Leadership
- Sarpanch: Chanda Devi
- Deputy Sarpanch: Kanha Mali
- Seats: 9

Elections
- Voting system: First-past-the-post
- Last election: 16 November 2026
- Next election: 2031

Mahapura Gram Panchayat is a gram panchayat in Chauth Ka Barwara Panchayat Samiti of Sawai Madhopur district, Rajasthan, India. It is assigned Gram Panchayat code 41500 by the Ministry of Panchayati Raj.

== Gram Panchayat Sadasy ==
Ward members of Gram Panchayat
Ward No.	Member	Reservation
1	—	OBC (Open)
2	—	SC (Women)
3	—	ST (Open)
4	—	SC (Women)
5	—	SC (Open)
6	—	General (Open)
7	—	General (Open)
8	—	General (Women)
9	—	ST (Women)

== Elections ==
=== 2026 election ===
The 2026 Rajasthan Panchayati Raj elections are scheduled to be held for the election of the sarpanch and ward panchs of Mahapura Gram Panchayat. The reservation process for sarpanch and ward panch posts in Sawai Madhopur district was completed on 24 September 2026.

For the 2026 election, the sarpanch post of Mahapura Gram Panchayat is reserved for a woman belonging to the Scheduled Tribes (ST) category.

The gram panchayat has nine wards. The reservation categories for the wards for the 2026 election are as follows:

Ward members of Gram Panchayat
Ward No.	Member	Reservation
1	—	OBC (Open)
2	—	SC (Women)
3	—	ST (Open)
4	—	SC (Women)
5	—	SC (Open)
6	—	General (Open)
7	—	General (Open)
8	—	General (Women)
9	—	ST (Women)

=== Wards ===
Mahapura Gram Panchayat is divided into 9 wards. The details of the wards, including the areas/mohallas covered, number of electors, and polling booth numbers (as per the 2026 electoral roll) are as follows:

Ward No.	Area / Mohallas	Electors	Booth No.
1	Meena Dhani, near Tutayas Jain Mandir, Mahapura Jat Mohalla	375 (Male 197 · Female 178)	20
2	Jat Mohalla Mahapura, near the pond	337 (Male 172 · Female 165)	20
3	Near the pond, Mahapura Meena Basti, Gurjar Mohalla Mahapura	383 (Male 206 · Female 177)	21
4	Bairwa Basti Mahapura, Meena ki Dhani, Piplaya, Bairwa Basti Pratham, Piplaya Bag ki Dhani, Piplaya	407 (Male 210 · Female 197)	21
5	Bairwa Basti Pratham, Naveen Piplaya, Main village Piplaya	316 (Male 168 · Female 148)	22
6	Main village Piplaya, Bairwa Basti Dwitiya, Kothyari ki Dhani	312 (Male 158 · Female 154)	22
7	Kumharo ki Dhani, Murli Manoharpura, partial Gurjar Mohalla	340 (Male 178 · Female 162)	23
8	Brahman Mohalla, Meena Mohalla, Maliyo ka Mohalla	341 (Male 167 · Female 174)	23
9	Mali Mohalla, Raigar Basti, Dhandh ki Dhani	326 (Male 165 · Female 161)	22

Total electors: 3,137 (Male 1,621 · Female 1,516)

== Administration ==
Mahapura Gram Panchayat is administered through the elected sarpanch, deputy sarpanch and ward panches. In September 2022, the deputy sarpanch and ward panches approached the Chauth Ka Barwara Panchayat Samiti office over the lack of development works and public-interest issues in the panchayat area. They subsequently withdrew their intention to resign after the Block Development Officer asked them to submit their grievances in writing for resolution.

== List of villages ==
1. Mahapura

2. Peeplya

3. Murli Manoharpura

4. Parvati Nagar

A report by the State Level Bankers' Committee, Rajasthan, listed four villages under Mahapura Gram Panchayat: Mahapura, Peeplya, Murli Manoharpura and Bandh Gopalpura. The report recorded their combined population as 3,078.
