= Chhoti Udai railway station =

Railway station in Rajasthan, India

Chhoti Udai railway station छोटी उदई रेलवे स्टेशन

General information
- Location: Chhoti Udai, Gangapur City tehsil, Sawai Madhopur district, Rajasthan; Sawai Madhopur; India
- System: Passenger train station
- Owner: Indian Railways
- Operator: West Central Railway zone
- Line: New Delhi–Mumbai main line
- Train operators: West Central Railway

Other information
- Status: Active
- Station code: COO
- Fare zone: West Central Railway zone
Location

Chhoti Udai railway station is a railway station in Sawai Madhopur district of Rajasthan, India. The station falls under the Kota division of the West Central Railway zone of Indian Railways.

The station lies on the New Delhi–Mumbai main line. The station code of Chhoti Udai railway station is COO.
