= Chauth Mata Temple =

Temple in Rajasthan, India

- Location in Chauth Ka Barwara, Rajasthan.

Religion
- Affiliation: Hinduism
- District: Sawai Madhopur

Location
- Location: Chauth Ka Barwara
- State: Rajasthan
- Country: India
- Interactive map of Chauth Mata Temple
- Coordinates: 26.051085°N 76.1361334°E

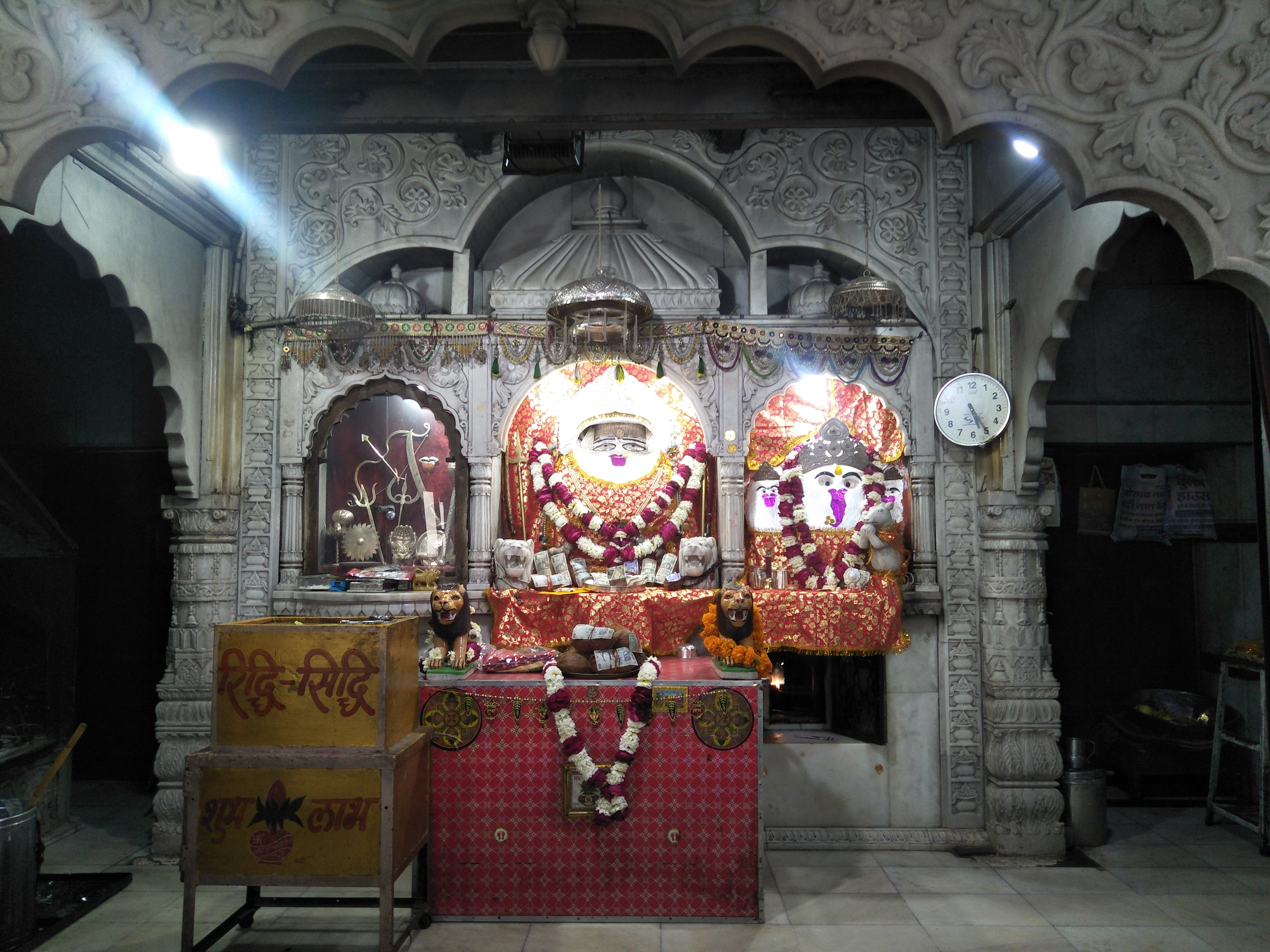
Chauth Mata

Chauth Mata Temple is located in a village named Chauth Ka Barwara in Sawai Madhopur district of Indian state of Rajasthan.

== History ==
This is one of the oldest temple of Rajasthan. This was built by Bhim Singh of Marwar, brought the Chauth Mata idol from a nearby village.
