= Ghushmeshwar Temple =

Jyotirlinga of Lord Shiva

- घुश्मेश्वर मन्दिर
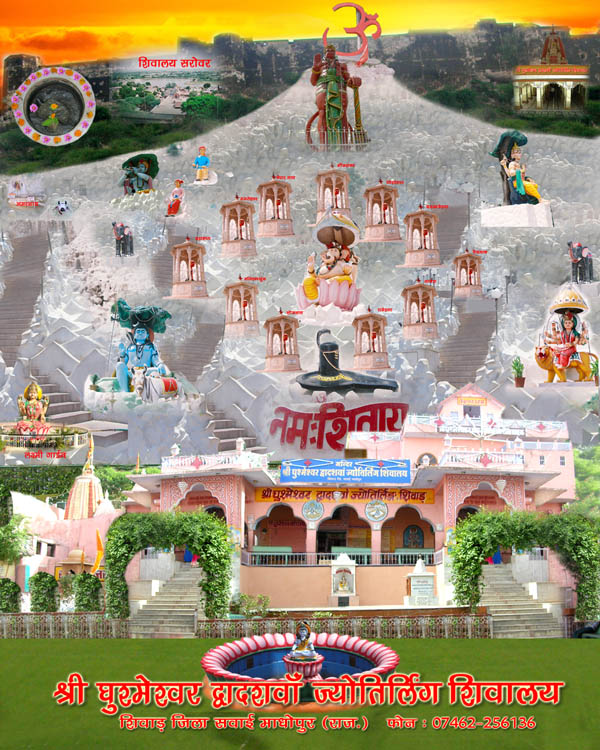

- Location in Shiwar, Rajasthan.

Religion
- Affiliation: Hinduism
- District: Sawai Madhopur
- Deity: Ghushmeshwar
- Festival: Maha Shivaratri

Location
- Location: Shiwar
- State: Rajasthan
- Country: India
- Interactive map of Ghushmeshwar Temple
- Coordinates: 26.1970014°N 76.0227566°E

Website
- ghushmeshwar.com

Ghushmeshwar is a Shiva temple, claimed by devotees to be the twelfth Jyotirlinga of Lord Shiva in the Hindu religion, which is located in the village of Shiwar, Rajasthan, India.
