= Dheel Dam =

Ancient dam in India

- Interactive map of Dheel Dam
- Official name: Dheel Dam
- Location: Tapur, Sawai Madhopur district, Rajasthan
- Coordinates: 26°13′22.48″N 76°7′1.79″E

Dheel Dam is a earthen dam on the Dheel River near Tapur and Taroli in Sawai Madhopur district, Rajasthan, India.

In 2022 Dam recorded the highest rainfall, 176mm.

== History ==
The Dheel Dam was constructed on the Dheel River in the former Jaipur State of Rajputana as part of the Dhil River Irrigation Works. The project, designed by engineer Charles Egremont Strother, was carried out between 1905 and 1912. The works included a masonry dam across the Dheel River, three earthen dams and a masonry escape, together with a main irrigation canal.

Contemporary official records of the British Indian Government also mention the Dhil Nadi Bund as one of the principal irrigation works in progress in Jaipur State during the year 1911–12.

The British Library's Charles Egremont Stotherd Collection contains photographs of the Dhil Nadi Dam dating from 1909–1910, including views of the dam when overflowing.
