= Khandar =

- Town
- Location in Rajasthan, India Khandar (India)
- Coordinates: 26°1′24″N 76°36′35″E
- Country: India
- State: Rajasthan
- District: Sawai Madhopur

Government
  - Body: Tehsil Municipality

Population
  - Total: 15,000

Languages
  - Official: Hindi
  - Other: Hindi, Harauti, Dundhani
- Time zone: UTC+5:30 (IST)
- PIN: 322025
- Telephone code: 07468
- Vehicle registration: RJ-
- Nearest city: Sawai Madhopur
- Literacy: 70%%
- Lok Sabha constituency: tonk sawaimadhopur
- Civic agency: tehsil
- Climate: Normal (Köppen)

Khandar is a town and tehsil in district Sawai Madhopur, Rajasthan. The river Banas River flows through Khandar.

== Geography ==
It is located at 26°00′00″N 76°36′00″E.

== See also ==
- Khandar Fort
- Ranthambore National Park

There also is a fort here named 'Taragrah'. A famous temple "Shri Ji Mandir" is situated at the heart of Khandar.
