= Dheel =

- Interactive Map The Dheel River (shown in red), a tributary of the Banas River (shown in Saffron)
- Native name: ढील (Hindi)

Location
- Country: India
- State: Rajasthan
- Districts: Tonk, Sawai Madhopur

Physical characteristics
- Source
  - location: Plains near Niwai, Tonk District
  - coordinates: 26°23′59″N 76°0′47″E
- Mouth: Banas-Dheel sangam confluence
  - location: near Rathod Village, Sawai Madhopur district
  - coordinates: 26°10′36″N 76°10′46″E
- Length: 64 km (40 mi)

Basin features
- Tributaries
  - left: Unnamed River
  - right: Gudia River, Unnamed River

The Dheel (also spelled Dhil) is a river in the Indian state of Rajasthan. It originates in the plains near Niwai in Tonk district and flows from north to south through the districts of Tonk and Sawai Madhopur. It is a tributary of the Banas River, itself a tributary of the Chambal River, which in turn merges into the Yamuna. According to the National Council of Applied Economic Research (NCAER), the average annual flow of the Dheel River is 0.0043 m.ham.m.

The Dheel is approximately 64 kilometres in length. It has a catchment area of 890 sq.m. Dheel Dam is built on the Dheel River. The ancient archaeological site of Rairh (often referred to as the 'Tatanagar of Ancient India' due to the discovery of a massive hoard of ancient punch-marked coins) is located right on the banks of this river network in Tonk.

== History ==
In the early 20th century, the Dheel River was the site of irrigation works in Jaipur State. In his 1924 paper, Ramgarh and Dhil River Irrigation Works, Jaipur State, Rajputana, Charles Egremont Stotherd described irrigation works carried out on the Dheel River between 1905 and 1912. The works included a masonry dam across the river, three earthen dams, a masonry escape, and a main irrigation canal.

The Dheel River became associated with irrigation development in Jaipur State in the early 20th century. The British Library's Charles Egremont Stotherd Collection records a masonry dam on the Dhil Nadi in 1906 and later photographs of the Dhil Nadi Irrigation Dam dated 5 January 1923. The photographs identify the dam as having been designed and constructed by C. E. Stotherd between 1905 and 1910.

== See also ==
- Banas River
- List of rivers of Rajasthan
