= Bageena =

- Village
- Location within Rajasthan Location within India
- Coordinates: 26°08′51″N 76°07′24″E
- Country: India
- State: Rajasthan
- District: Sawai Madhopur

Population (2011)
  - Total: 1,348

Demographics
  - Literacy: 58.36%
  - Sex ratio: 817

Bageena is a village located in Chauth Ka Barwara tehsil of Sawai Madhopur district, Rajasthan, India.
