= Encher =

Encher ऐंचेर
- Village
- Country: India
- State: Rajasthan
- District: Sawai Madhopur

Government
  - Type: Panchayati raj (India)
  - Body: Gram panchayat
  - sarpanch: Tara Devi

Population
  - Total: 1,627

Demographics
  - Literacy: 58.38%
  - Sex ratio: 916
- PIN: 322703

Encher is a village located in Chauth Ka Barwara tehsil of Sawai Madhopur district, Rajasthan, India.
