= Tapur =

- Village
- Location within Rajasthan Location within India
- Coordinates: 26.2087029°N 76.1044608°E
- Country: India
- State: Rajasthan
- District: Sawai Madhopur

Government
  - Type: Panchayati raj (India)
  - Body: Gram panchayat
  - sarpanch: Tara Devi

Population (2011)
  - Total: 1,537

Demographics
  - Literacy: 65.20
  - Sex ratio: 951
  - Official: Hindi

Languages
- Time zone: UTC+5:30
- PIN: 322703
- ISO 3166 code: IND

Tapur is a village and gram panchayat headquarters located in the Sawai Madhopur district of Rajasthan.
