= Kurgaon =

- Village
- Location within Rajasthan Location within India
- Coordinates: 26°27′22″N 76°51′15″E
- Country: India
- State: Rajasthan
- District: Karauli

Population (2011)
  - Total: 4,113

Demographics
  - Literacy: 69.06%
  - Sex ratio: 909

Kurgaon is a village located in Sapotra Tehsil of Karauli district, Rajasthan, India.
