= Peeplya =

- Village
- Location within Rajasthan Location within India
- Coordinates: 26.223359°N 76.0089603°E
- Country: India
- State: Rajasthan
- District: Sawai Madhopur

Government
  - Type: Panchayati raj (India)
  - Body: Gram panchayat
  - sarpanch: Chanda Devi

Population (2011)
  - Total: 1,312

Demographics
  - Literacy: 53.41
  - Sex ratio: 915
  - Official: Hindi

Languages
- PIN: 322704

Peeplya village is located in Chouth ka Barwara tehsil of Sawai Madhopur district, Rajasthan, India.
