= Sarsop =

- Village
- Location within Rajasthan Location within India
- Coordinates: 26.161271°N 76.075819°E
- Country: India
- State: Rajasthan
- District: Sawai Madhopur

Population (2011)
  - Total: 5,356

Demographics
  - Literacy: 59.77
  - Sex ratio: 963

Sarsop village is located in Chauth ka Barwara tehsil of Sawai Madhopur district, Rajasthan, India.

There is a famous and grand temple of Chamunda Mata in Sarsop village on top of the fort
