= Shiwar Gram Panchayat =

Type
- Term limits: 5 years

Leadership
- Sarpanch: Prem Devi

Shiwar Gram Panchayat is one of the 23 Gram Panchayat in the block of Chauth ka Barwara in Sawai Madhopur.

== List of villages ==
1. Shiwar

2. Sitarampura
