= Baroni, India =

Baroni
- Village
- Location within Rajasthan Location within India
- Coordinates: 26°16′45″N 75°53′34″E
- Country: India
- State: Rajasthan
- District: Tonk

Population (2011)
  - Total: 1,695

Demographics
  - Literacy: 66.12%
  - Sex ratio: 1030

Baroni is a village located in Tonk Tehsil of Tonk district, Rajasthan, India.
