= Adalwara Kalan =

Village in Rajasthan, India

- village
- Location in Rajasthan, India Adalwara Kalan (India)
- Coordinates: 26.083352°N 76.235806°E
- Country: India
- State: Rajasthan
- District: Sawai Madhopur

Population
  - Total: 1,914

Languages
  - Official: Hindi
  - Other: Hindi, Harauti, Dundhani
- Time zone: UTC+5:30 (IST)
- PIN: 322701
- Telephone code: 07468
- ISO 3166 code: RJ-IN
- Vehicle registration: RJ-25
- Nearest city: Sawai Madhopur
- Literacy: 56.13%
- Lok Sabha constituency: tonk sawaimadhopur
- Civic agency: tehsil
- Climate: Normal (Köppen)

Adalwara Kalan is an Indian village located at Sawai Madhopur, Rajasthan.

== Demography ==
As of the 2011 census, Adalwara Kalam has a population of 1914, of which 979 are males and 935 are females.
