= Isarda =

- Village
- Location within Rajasthan Location within India
- Coordinates: 26.156°N 76.028°E
- Country: India
- State: Rajasthan
- District: Sawai Madhopur

Government
  - Type: Panchayati raj (India)
  - Body: Gram panchayat
  - sarpanch: Pukhraj Gujjar

Population (2011)
  - Total: 5,523

Demographics
  - Literacy: 62.06
  - Sex ratio: 928
  - Official: Hindi

Languages
- PIN: 322703

Isarda is a village and gram panchayat headquarters located in the Sawai Madhopur district of Rajasthan.

== History ==
Isarda was a Thikana estate that was founded in the early 17th century as a feudal vassal state to the erstwhile Kingdom of Jaipur.
