= Chauth Ka Barwara =

- Village
- Location within Rajasthan Location within India
- Coordinates: 26.051085°N 76.1361334°E
- Country: India
- State: Rajasthan
- District: Sawai Madhopur

Government
  - sarpanch: Sita Devi

Population (2011)
  - Total: 14,038

Demographics
  - Literacy: 69.28
  - Sex ratio: 937

Chauth Ka Barwara is a town and tehsil headquarters situated in Sawai Madhopur district, Rajasthan. It is also known for Chauth Mata Temple in the region.
