= Shiwar =

Shiwar (Shivad) Shiwad
- Village
- Location within Rajasthan Location within India
- Coordinates: 26.1991517°N 76.0319319°E
- Country: India
- State: Rajasthan
- District: Sawai Madhopur

Government
  - Village sarpanch: Prem Devi Prashant Bairwa

Population (2011)
  - Total: 7,798

Demographics
  - Literacy: 69.33
  - Sex ratio: 936
- Time zone: UTC+5:30 (IST)
- PIN: 322704

Shiwar is a village and gram panchayat headquarters located in the Sawai Madhopur district of Rajasthan.

The temple of Ghushmeshwar, the last Jyotirlinga of Lord Shiva, is located in this village.
