= Ranthambore National Park =

National park in Rajasthan, India

- IUCN category II (national park)
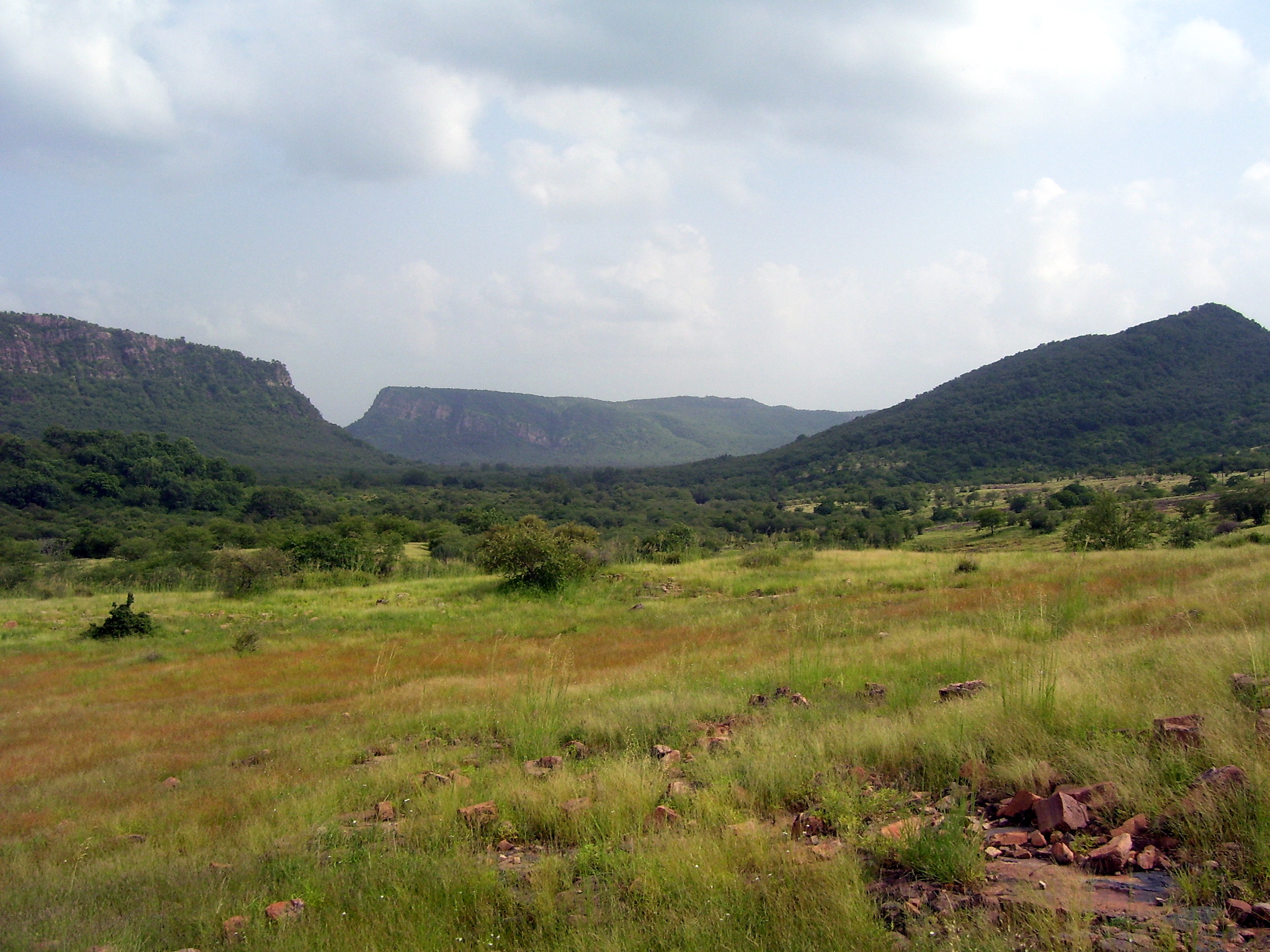

- Location within Rajasthan Location within India
- Interactive map of Ranthambore National Park
- Location: Sawai Madhopur, Rajasthan, India
- Nearest city: Sawai Madhopur
- Coordinates: 26°01′02″N 76°30′09″E
- Area: 1,334 km^{2} (515 sq mi)
- Established: 1974 (as Tiger Reserve); 1980 (as National Park)
- Governing body: Ministry of Environment and Forests, Project Tiger

Ranthambore National Park is a national park in the Indian state of Rajasthan with an area of 1,334 km^{2} (515 sq mi). It is bounded to the north by the Banas River and to the south by the Chambal River. It is named after the historic Ranthambore Fort, which lies within its boundaries in Sawai Madhopur district.

== History ==
Ranthambore National Park was established as the Sawai Madhopur Game Sanctuary in 1955, initially covering an area of 282 km^{2} (109 sq mi). It was declared one of the Project Tiger reserves in 1974. It was declared a national park in 1980.

== Geography ==
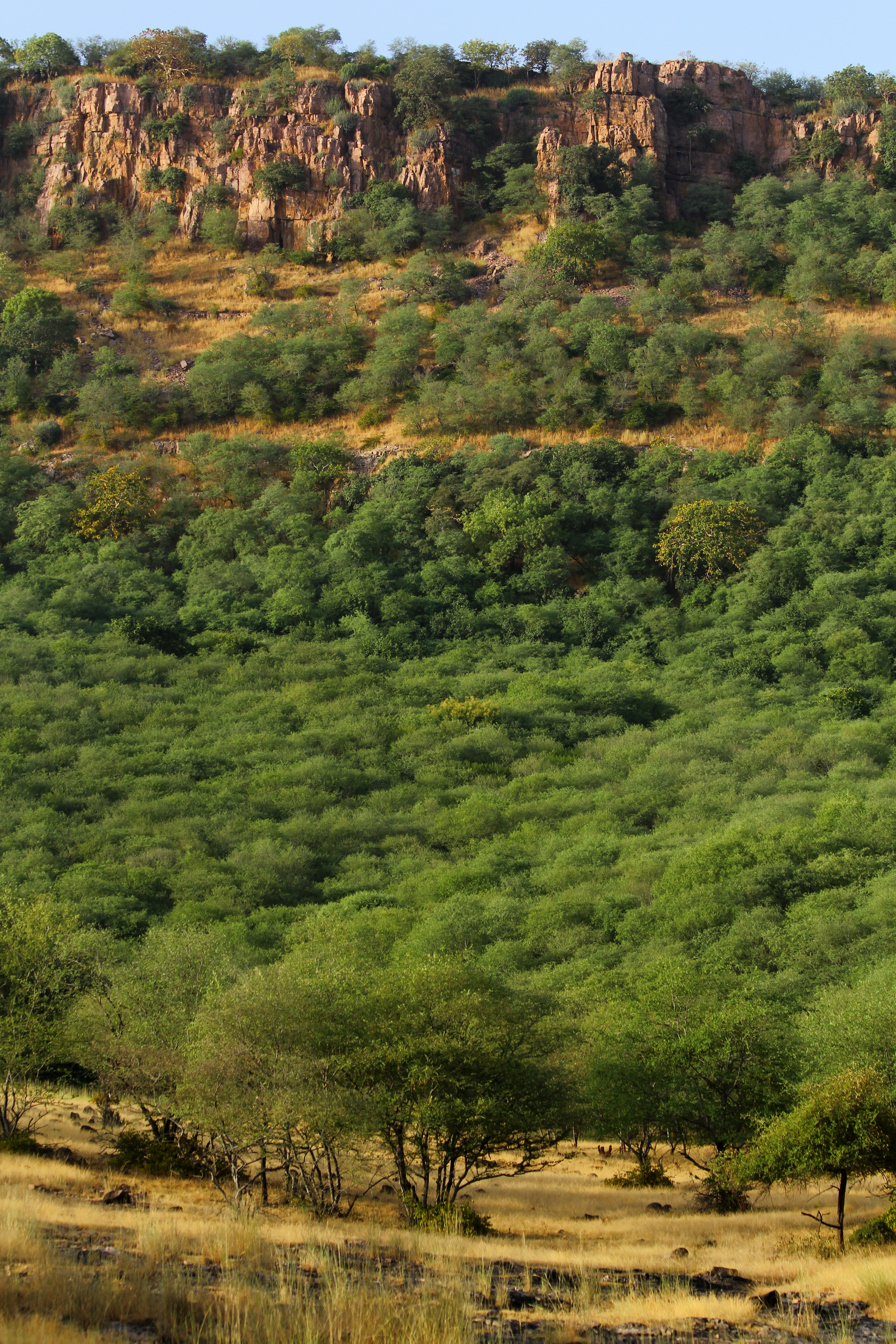
Landscape of Ranthambore National Park

Ranthambore National Park covers a total area of 1,334 km^{2} (515 sq mi) including the Kailadevi Wildlife Sanctuary and Sawai Man Singh Sanctuary. The core area spans approximately 275 km^{2} (106 sq mi). It harbours dry deciduous forests and open grassy meadows at an elevation of about 215–505 m (705–1,657 ft).

Ranthambore Fort was built in the 10th century at 210 m (700 ft) above the surrounding plain. Inside the fort are three red-stone temples devoted to Ganesh, Shiva, and Ramlalaji, and a Digambara temple of Sumatinatha and Sambhavanatha that were constructed in the 12th and 13th centuries. Padam Talao is the largest of the many lakes in the park, with a historic rest house on its edge.

== Flora ==
Ranthambore National Park harbours over 300 tree species, including more than 100 of medicinal importance. The land features dense tropical dry forest, open bushland, and rocky terrain, interspersed with lakes and streams. The ecoregion includes the Khathiar-Gir dry deciduous forests. The characteristic tree of Ranthambore National Park is the dhonk (Anogeissus pendula) which is dry and brown in the summers but even few drops of rain turn the trees green.

== Fauna ==
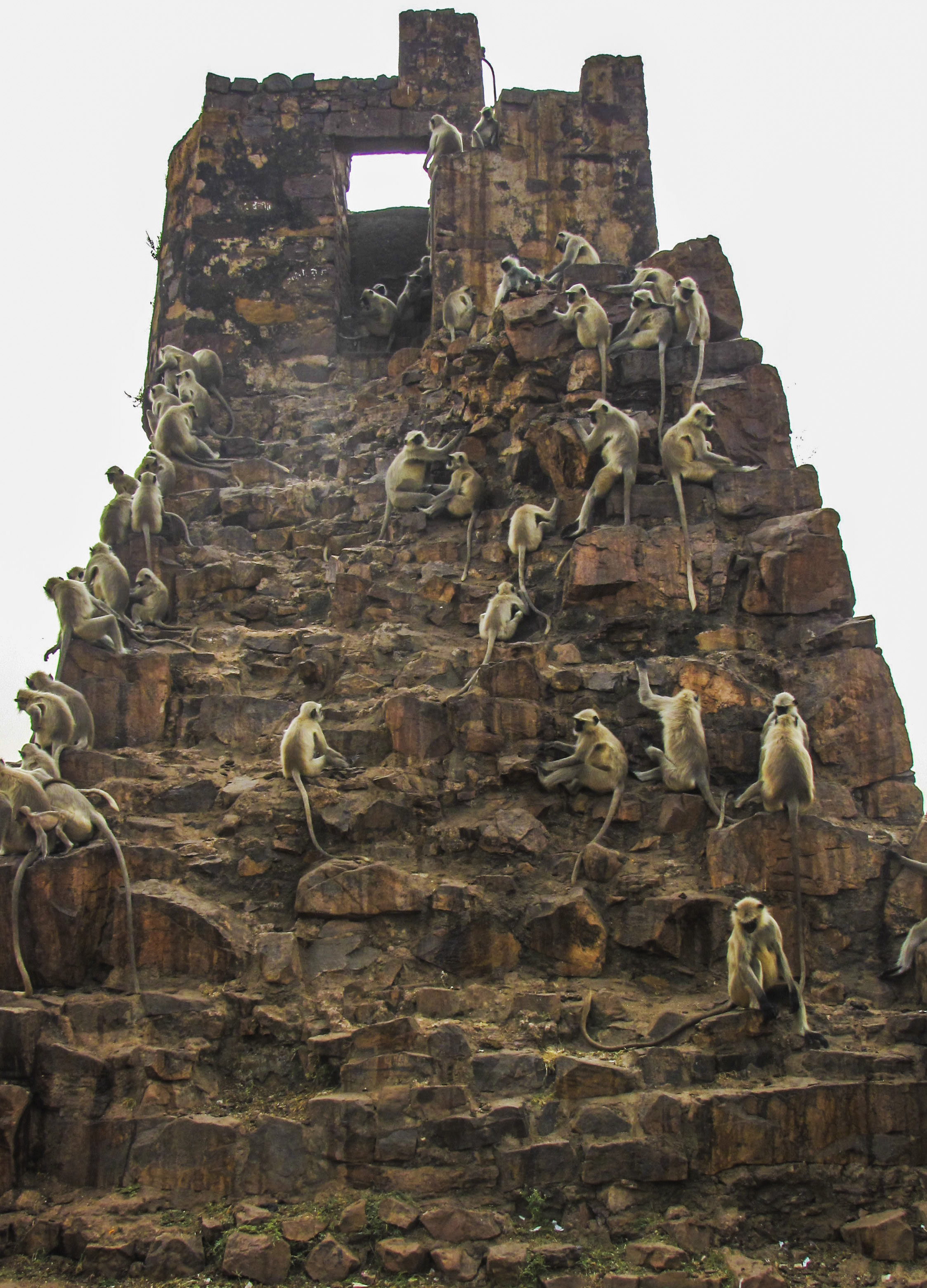
A group of gray langurs at Ranthambore fort

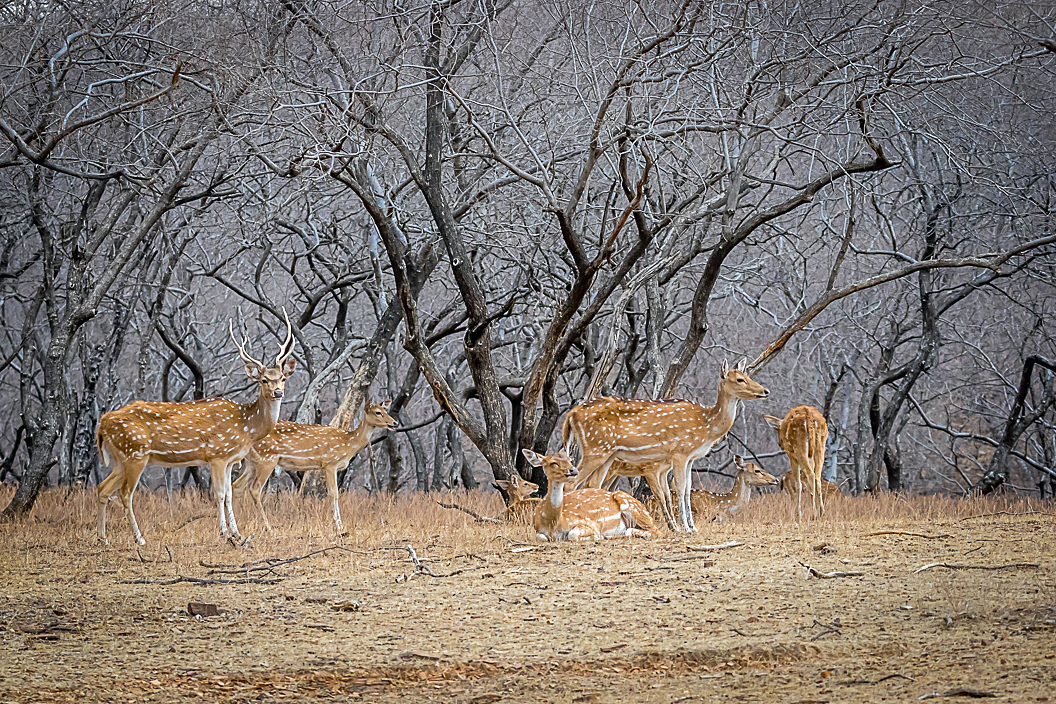
Spotted deer herd in Ranthambore National Park

Ranthambore National Park hosts many wild animals including chital, sambar, blackbuck, chinkara, nilgai, langurs, rhesus macaque, golden jackal, striped hyena, jungle cat, caracal, Indian leopard, Bengal tiger and sloth bear. More than 270 bird species have been recorded, including peafowl, crested serpent eagle, painted francolin, and Indian paradise flycatcher. It is also home to many species of reptiles such as monitor lizard, Indian rock python, Indian cobra, Indian softshell turtle and mugger crocodile. Cheetahs occasionally wander in from nearby Kuno National Park.

=== Tigers ===
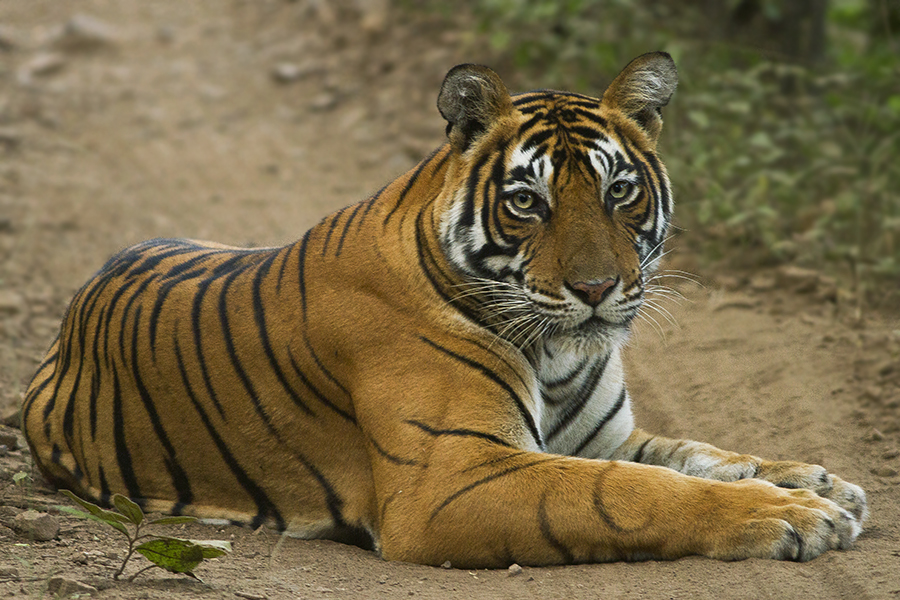
Tiger in Ranthambore National Park

Ranthambore National Park is known for its Bengal tiger population. During the past few years, there has been a decline in numbers due to poaching and other reasons. The population declined to about 15 individuals in the early 2000s. A genomic study indicated that the tigers might be inbred, but there are no visible signs of inbreeding depression. As of 2022, there were 69 tigers in the national park.

== Ecosystem valuation ==
Economic valuation of the tiger reserve estimated that its flow benefits are worth 8.3 billion rupees (0.56 lakh/hectare) annually. Gene-pool protection services (7.11 billion), provisioning of water to the neighbouring region (115 million) and provisioning of habitat and refuge for wildlife (182 million) were some of the important services that emanated from the tiger reserve. Other services included nutrient cycling (34 million) and sequestration of carbon (69 million).

== See also ==
- Indian Council of Forestry Research and Education
- Rajiv Gandhi Regional Museum of Natural History
