= Sawai Madhopur district =

Coordinates: 26°00′52″N 76°21′08″E

Sawai Madhopur district Sawai Madhopur
- District of Rajasthan
- Sawai Madhopur
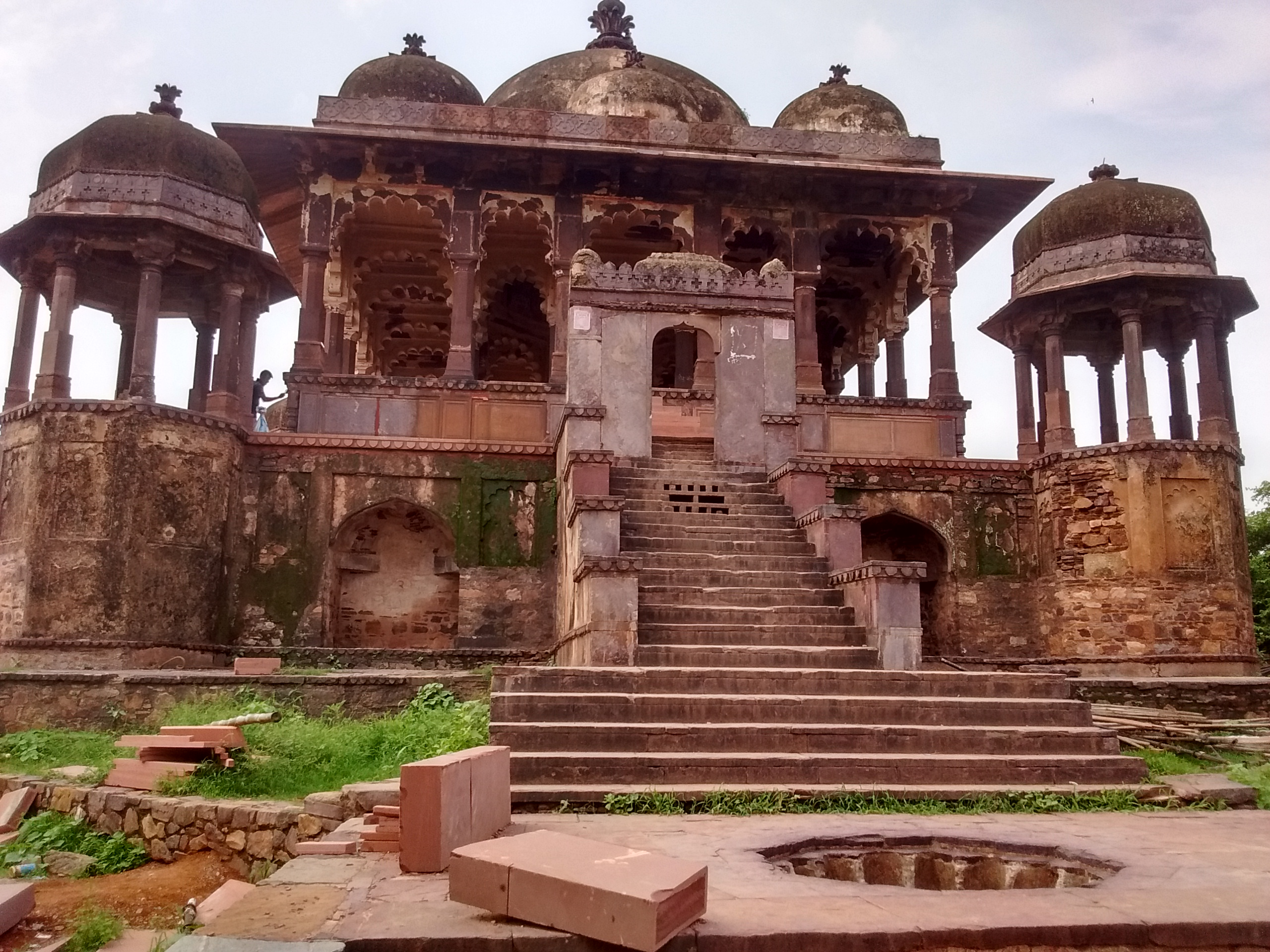
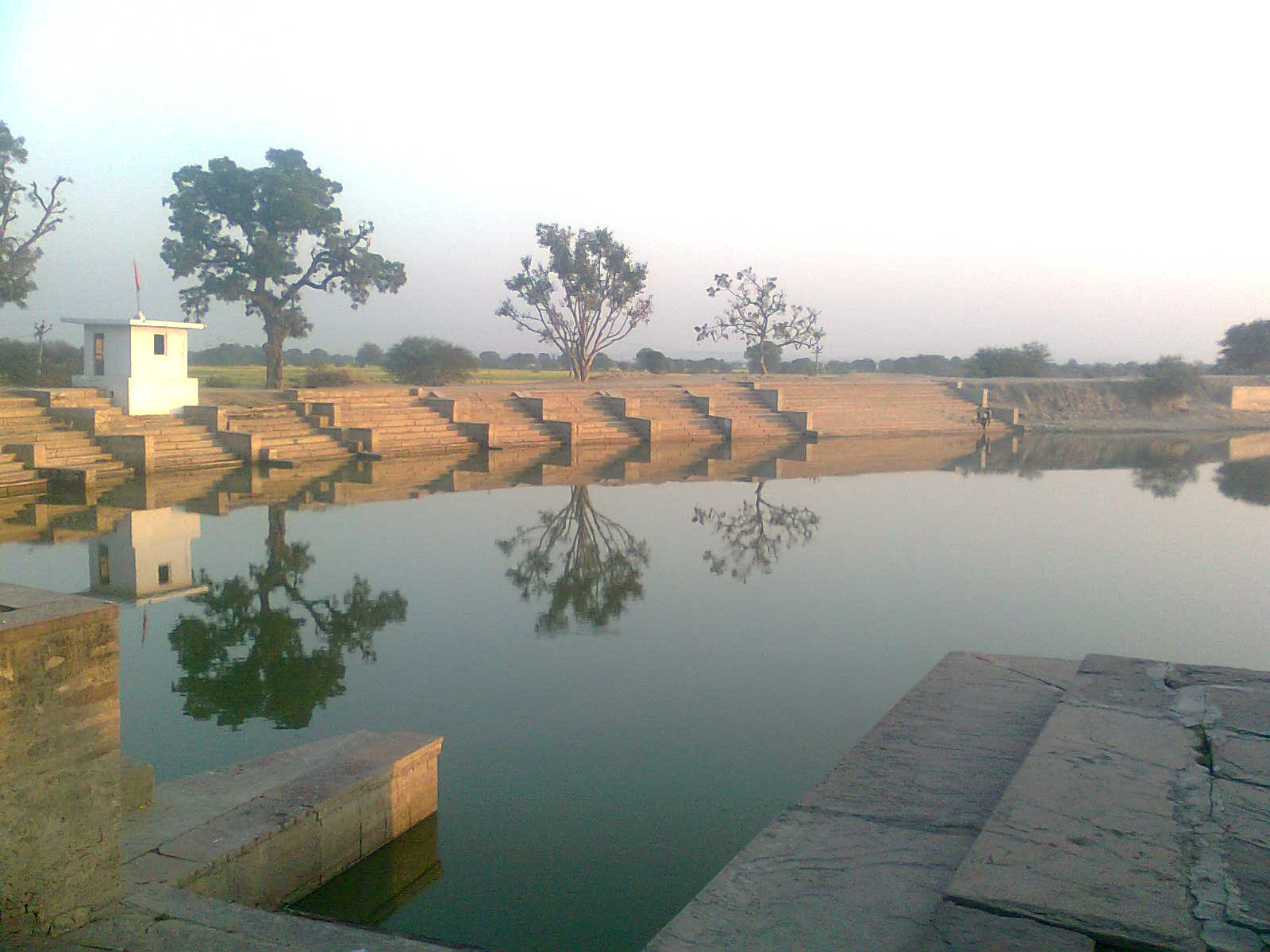
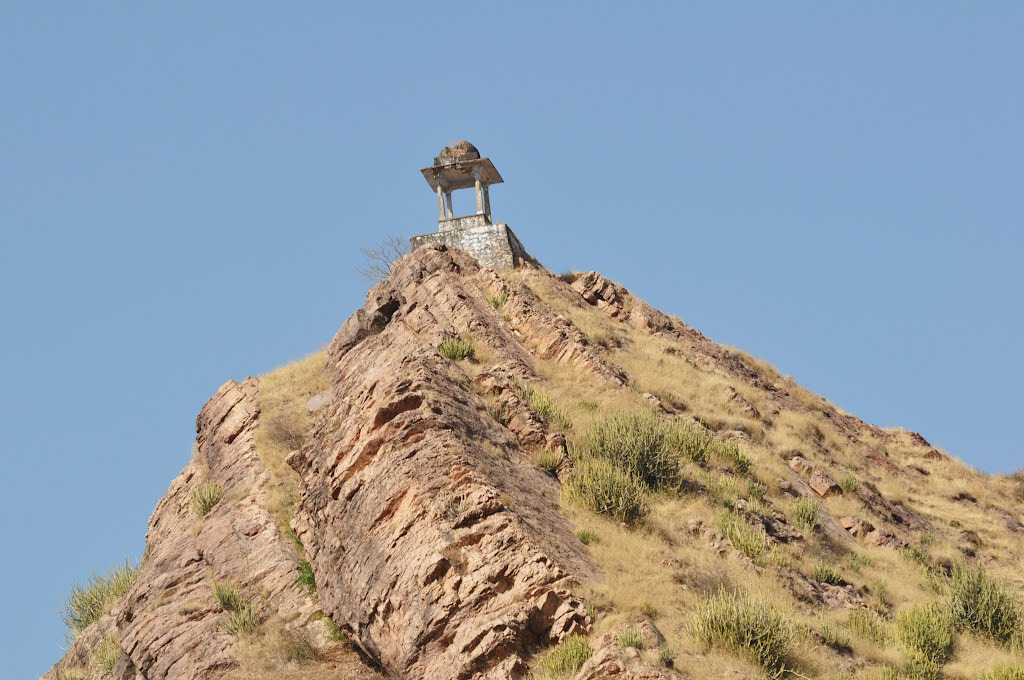
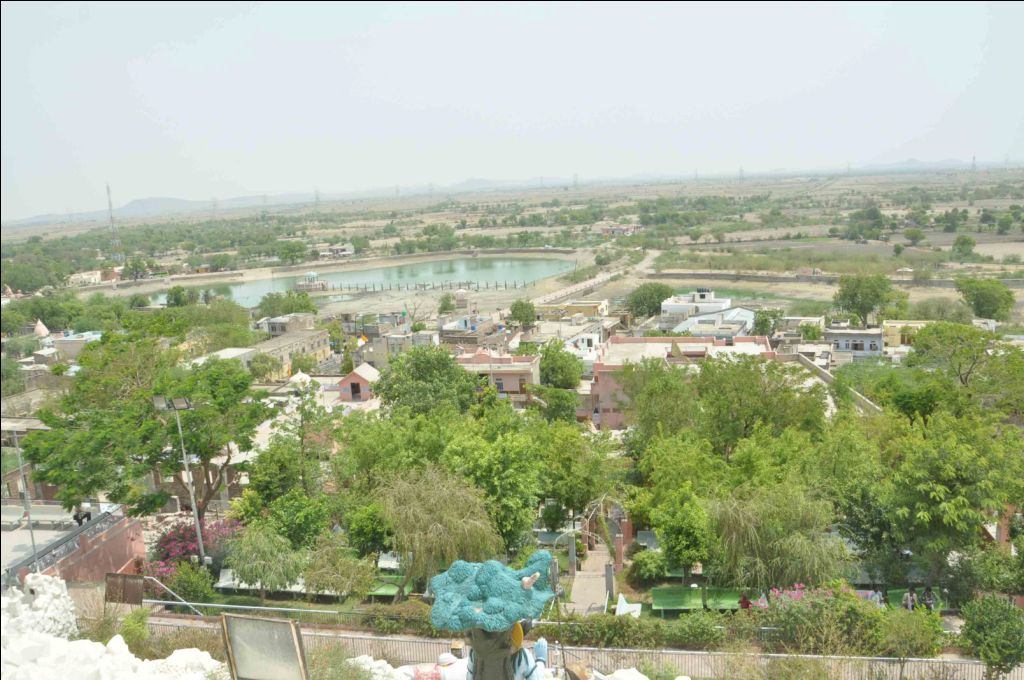
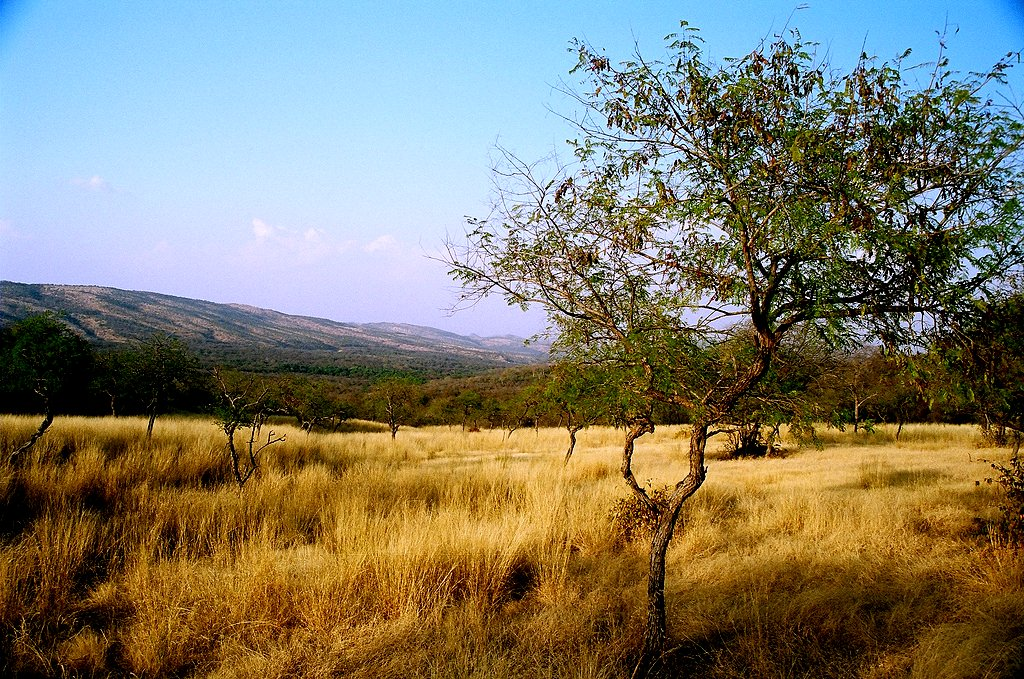
- Clockwise from top-left: 36 Pillar Chhatri in Ranthambore Fort, Temple tank near Lakhod, Ghushmeshwar Temple in Shiwar, Aravalli Range in Ranthambore Tiger Reserve, Watchtower near Sawai Madhopur

- Location of Sawai Madhopur district in Rajasthan
- Country: India
- State: Rajasthan
- Division: Bharatpur
- Headquarter: Sawai Madhopur

Government
  - District Collector & Magistrate: Kanaram Sirvi, IAS
  - Superintendent of Police: Dr. Mamta Gupta, IPS

Area
  - Total: 10,527 km^{2} (4,064 sq mi)

Population (2011)
  - Total: 1,335,551
  - Density: 126.87/km^{2} (328.59/sq mi)

Demographics
  - Literacy: 65.39
  - Sex ratio: 897
- Time zone: UTC+05:30 (IST)
- Website: Sawai Madhopur District

Sawai Madhopur district is one of the 41 districts of the Indian state of Rajasthan, located in its south-eastern region and forming part of the Bharatpur Division. The district covers an area of 5051.9 square kilometres (1950.9 sq mi) and has its administrative headquarters at Sawai Madhopur city. It is bounded by Dausa and Karauli districts to the north, Madhya Pradesh to the east, Kota and Bundi to the south, and Tonk to the west. The district is traversed by the Dheel, Banas, Chambal, and Morel rivers and contains a mix of plains, plateaus, and hill ranges of the Aravalli system.

Sawai Madhopur is best known for the Ranthambore National Park, a major tiger reserve and UNESCO World Heritage site forming part of the Hill Forts of Rajasthan. The district’s economy is based on agriculture, animal husbandry, hospitality, tourism, and small-scale industries. As of the 2011 Census of India, it had a population of 1.33 million, with a density of around 265 inhabitants per square kilometre.

== Geography and climate ==
Sawai Madhopur District spans an area of 4,498 square kilometres. It is bordered by Dausa district to the north, Karauli district to the northeast, Sheopur district of Madhya Pradesh to the southeast, and Kota and Bundi districts to the south. To the west lies Tonk district. Geographically, it is situated between 25°-45’ to 26°-41’ northern latitude and 75°-59’ to 77°-0’ eastern longitude.

The district features a mix of plains and undulating hills, with significant portions characterized by the Aravalli ranges. The Ranthambore Tiger Reserve, part of the Aravalli Hills, is a globally recognized wildlife sanctuary and heritage site. The Chambal River forms the southeastern boundary of the district, separating it from Madhya Pradesh. Other important rivers include the Dheel, Banas and Morel, which contribute to the district's riverine system.

The district's elevation ranges between 450 and 600 meters above sea level, with the highest peak in the northwestern Aravalli range in Bamanwas Tehsil reaching 527 meters. The southern and southeastern regions of the district are marked by rugged terrain and ravines along the Chambal Valley, while the Gangapur subdivision is primarily flat, interspersed with isolated hills. The district is not classified as a desert area, and it lacks perennial natural springs. However, seasonal waterfalls like Amareshwar Mahadev, Sita Mata Temple, and Jhojheshwar flow during the rainy season.

Sawai Madhopur experiences a semi-arid climate characterized by hot summers, a monsoon season, and mild winters. Temperatures range from a maximum of 45°C in summer to a minimum of 4°C in winter. The average annual rainfall ranges between 600 and 800 mm, with the monsoon months of June to September accounting for most precipitation.

== Notable sights ==
- Dheel Dam
- Isarda Dam
- Ranthambore National Park
- Sawai Madhopur Wildlife Sanctuary

== Division ==
As of 2025, Sawai Madhopur district has 7 revenue subdivisions, each headed by a Sub-Divisional Officer (SDO/SDM) and 11 Tehsil, each headed by a Tehsildar for revenue and land records management.

- Sawai Madhopur
- Gangapur City
- Chauth Ka Barwara
- Khandar
- Bonli
- Malarna Dungar
- Bamanwas
- Wazirpur
- Barnala
- Talavada
- Mitrapura

Sawai Madhopur District: Revenue Scheme
Subdivision	Tehsil(s)	Land Record Circles (ILRCs)	Patwar Circles	Villages Total
Sawai Madhopur	Sawai Madhopur	7	48	152
Chauth Ka Barwara	Chauth Ka Barwara	3	24	64
Khandar	Khandar, Talawara	6	37	128
Bonli	Bonli, Wazirpur	4	31	104
Malarna Dungar	Malarna Dungar	3	24	76
Gangapur City	Gangapur City, Barnala	6	48	144
Bamanwas	Bamanwas, Mitrapura	7	55	150
		36	267	818

=== District Court ===
The Sawai Madhopur judgeship was established as an independent entity in 1977, having separated from the Bharatpur judgeship. Shri O.P. Jain was the inaugural District & Sessions Judge of this newly formed judgeship. Currently, Sawai Madhopur judgeship comprises a total of 22 courts. Of these, 11 courts, including the District & Sessions Court, operate at the district headquarters. Additionally, there are seven courts at the Gangapur City headquarters, and one court each at Bonli, Khandar, and Chauth ka Barwara.

Previously, all courts located at the district headquarters were housed in the collectorate building. However, on November 10, 2011, they were relocated to a new building.

At present, Shri Justice Atul Kumar Saxena serves as the District & Sessions Judge of Sawai Madhopur.

== Economy ==
In 2006 the Ministry of Panchayati Raj named Sawai Madhopur one of the country's 250 most backward districts (out of a total of 640). It is one of the 12 districts in Rajasthan currently receiving funds from the Backward Regions Grant Fund Programme (BRGF).

== Demographics ==
Historical population
Year	Pop.	±% p.a.
1901	264,632	—
1911	262,575	−0.08%
1921	236,115	−1.06%
1931	259,852	+0.96%
1941	293,648	+1.23%
1951	329,206	+1.15%
1961	421,063	+2.49%
1971	537,675	+2.47%
1981	688,360	+2.50%
1991	875,752	+2.44%
2001	1,117,057	+2.46%
2011	1,335,551	+1.80%

Religions in residual Sawai Madhopur district (2011)
Religion	Percent
Hinduism	86.70%
Islam	11.91%
Jainism	1.04%
Other or not stated	0.35%

According to the 2011 census Sawai Madhopur district has a population of 1,335,551, roughly equal to the nation of Mauritius or the US state of Maine. This gives it a ranking of 362nd in India (out of a total of 640). The district has a population density of 297 inhabitants per square kilometre (770/sq mi) . Its population growth rate over the decade 2001-2011 was 19.79%. Sawai Madhopur has a sex ratio of 894 females for every 1000 males, and a literacy rate of 66.19%. 19.95% of the population lives in urban areas. Scheduled Castes and Scheduled Tribes make up 20.87% and 21.40% of the population respectively.

After reorganisation, the residual district has a population of 817,289. The residual district has a sex ratio of 908 females per 1000 males. 136,406 (16.69%) lived in urban areas. Scheduled Castes and Scheduled Tribes made up 173,831 (21.27%) and 175,113 (21.43%) of the population respectively.

Languages of residual Sawai Madhopur district (2011)
1. Hindi (89.3%)
2. Rajasthani (5.23%)
3. Urdu (3.67%)
4. Dhundhari (0.97%)
5. Others (0.83%)

At the time of the 2011 census of India, 89.30% of the population in the district spoke Hindi, 5.23% Rajasthani, 3.67% Urdu and 0.97% Dhundhari as their first language. The main dialect of the district is Dhundari.

== Fairs and festivals ==
=== Ganesh Chaturthi Fair ===
Ganesh Chaturthi Fair is the largest fair of Sawai Madhopur. It is organised on Bhadav Shukla Chaturthi at Ganesh Temple, Ranthambhore Fort. People of Rajasthan and outside Rajasthan visit for this fair. Every year 3-4 lacs devotees participates in this fair. This fair is organised for three days.

=== Chauth Mata Fair ===
Chauth Mata Temple is about 25 km from the Sawai Madhopur city in Chauth Ka Barwara town. This fair is organised on Magh Krishna Chaturthi. Lacs of people around Rajasthan and other states visit here for this Fair.

=== Shiv Ratri Fair ===
The Ghushmeshwar Mahadev temple is located 3 km from Isarda Railway Station in Kota-Jaipur on the train route to Shiwar Town, at 100 km from Jaipur and 40 km from Sawai Madhopur in Rajasthan, India, near Ranthambore National Park. Annual fair is organised near the temple during Shiv Ratri.

=== Rameshwar Dham ===
The Rameshwaram Temple is 60 km from Sawai Madhopur on the confluence of Banas and Chambal River. It has a Shiva temple where a fair is held annually on Shiv Ratri. Lakhs of people Rajasthan and Madhya Pradesh visit here for this Fair.

=== Kalyan Ji Fair ===
Every year the Besakh Shukla Puranmasi fair is organised at Gangapur City for seven days. Thousands of people join this fair.

=== Chamatkar Ji Fair ===
A fair is organised at Chamatkarji on Sharad Purnima.

== See also ==
- Chauth Ka Barwara Tehsil
- Chauth Mata Temple
- Ghushmeshwar Temple
- Khandar Fort
- Rajiv Gandhi Regional Museum of Natural History
- Ranthambore Fort
- Sawai Madhopur Wildlife Sanctuary
- Ranthambhore Ganesh Temple
- Ranthambore National Park
- Sawai Madhopur
- Sawai Madhopur railway station
- Shilpgram, Sawai Madhopur
