= Battle of Kumher =

1754 Indian battle

Coordinates: 27.3148°N 77.3792°E

- Part of Maratha-Jat Wars
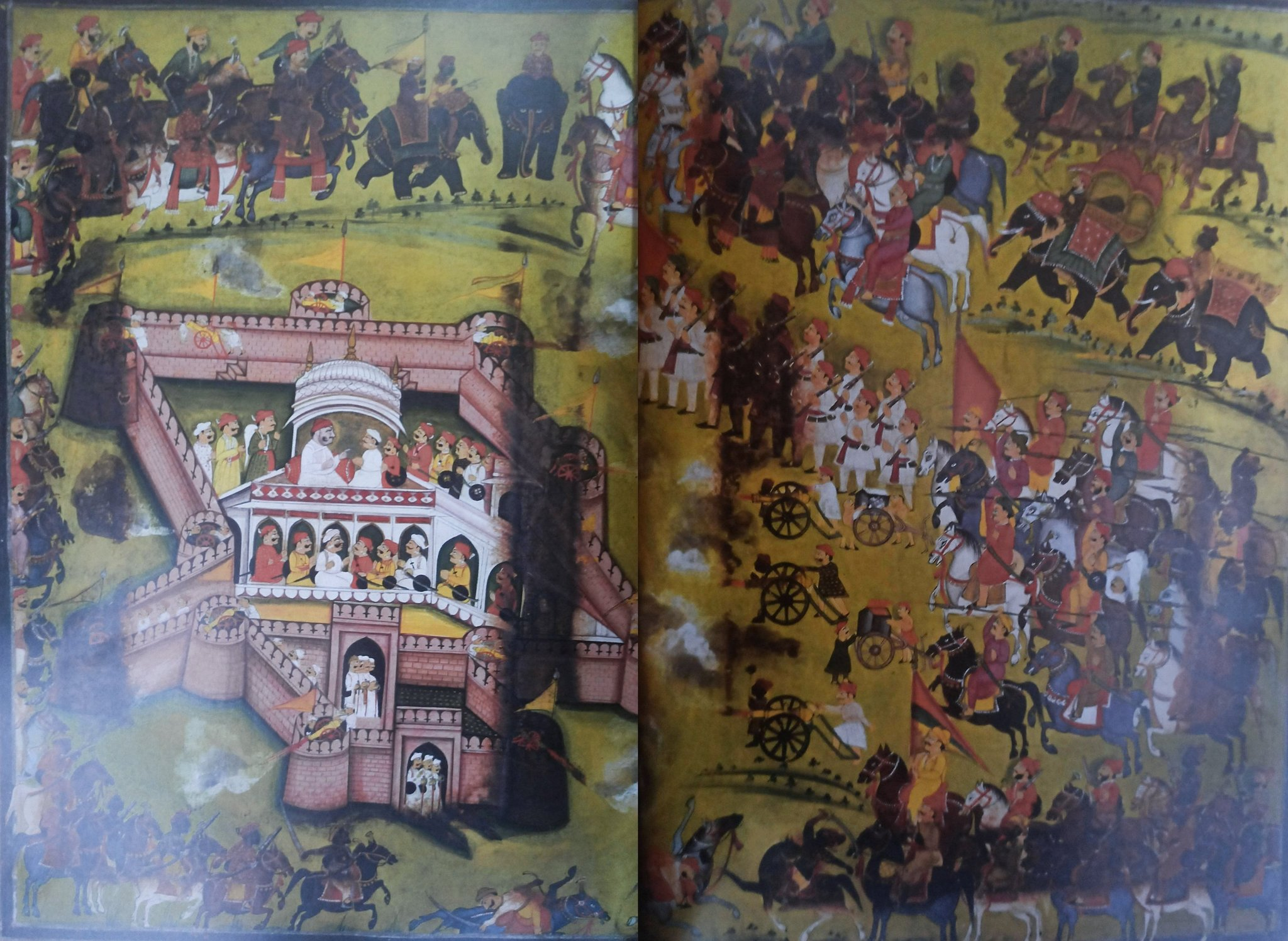
- Painting of the Siege of Kumher (1754), by Ramji, circa mid-to-late 18th century
Date	20 January 1754 – 18 May 1754
Location	Kumher
Result	Jat/Bharatpur victory

Belligerents
Kingdom of Bharatpur	Mughal Empire; Jaipur State; Maratha Confederacy

Commanders and leaders
Maharaja Suraj Mal	Imad-ul-Mulk; Amir Bakshi; Har Govind Natani; Raghunathrao; Khanderao Holkar †

Strength
Unknown	80,000

The Battle of Kumher was a conflict between the Kingdom of Bharatpur, led by Maharaja Suraj Mal, and the Mughal Empire, supported by its allies, including the Marathas.

== Battle ==
Kumher was founded by a Jat chieftain Kumbh. In 1754, when Suraj Mal was the king, the fort came under siege by Marathas, as peshwa Balaji Baji Rao's younger brother Raghunathrao (Supported by Scindias and Holkars) wanted to be subservient to them. However the siege did not succeed. In 1754, on behest of Mughal Emperor Alamgir II, Khanderao laid the siege of Kumher fort of Suraj Mal of Bharatpur, who had the sided with the Alamgir II's adversary Siraj ud-Daulah. Soon after, Gaziuddin Khan, the Amir Bakshi or supreme commander of the Emperor's forces, allied with the Marathas, bringing with him a considerable force of royal troops estimated to be between twenty-five to thirty thousand strong. This alliance, combined with the remaining troops under the Har govind Natani of Jaipur, resulted in the complete encirclement of Kumbher by an overwhelming army of over 80,000 men. Notably, these soldiers were considered superior to any others present in the region at that time.Despite facing a formidable defense led by Suraj Mal against 80,000 men, including Malhar Rao Holkar and Imad-ul-Mulk, the besiegers were compelled to retreat.

At Kumher, Malhar Rao Holkar's son, Khande Rao, was killed by a Jat swivel-gun. Accounts vary: one suggests he was lured by a 'nautch' girl, another claims he was killed inspecting a battery. Sir Jadunath Sarkar suggests Khande Rao was shot while drunk inspecting trenches. Nine wives self-immolated on his pyre, except Ahilya Bai, pregnant then. Malhar Rao, grief-stricken, vowed revenge. Suraj Mal, unusually decent, sent condolences and robes. A temple marks Khande Rao's fall.

Following the retreat, the Jats, buoyed by their successes at Kumher, seized the opportunity to plunder the surrounding areas near the imperial capital. Subsequently, an understanding was brokered between Suraj Mal and Raghunath Rao. Suraj Mal pledged not to oppose the Marathas' incursions into North India, while Raghunath Rao agreed to accept the occupation of much of the territory of the Agra subah. This diplomatic arrangement greatly facilitated the territorial expansion of the Jat power.By 1758, these events had significantly altered the political landscape of the region, marking a crucial turning point in the power dynamics of North India.
