= Punyashlok Ahilyabai =

Indian historical television series

- Genre: Historical drama
- Directed by: Jackson sethi
- Starring: See below
- Country of origin: India
- Original language: Hindi
- No. of seasons: 1
- No. of episodes: 735

Production
- Producers: Nitin Vaidya; Ninad Vaidya
- Camera setup: Multi-camera
- Running time: 20-23 minutes
- Production company: Dashami Creations

Original release
- Network: Sony Entertainment Television
- Release: 4 January 2021 – 27 October 2023

Punyashlok Ahilyabai is an Indian Hindi-language historical drama television series that aired from 4 January 2021 to 27 October 2023 on Sony TV. It's digitally available on Sony LIV. It is based on the life of queen Ahilyabai Holkar, who reigned over the region of Malwa from 1767 to 1795 and Produced by Dashami Creations.

== Cast ==
=== Main ===
- Aetashaa Sansgiri as Queen Ahilyabai Shinde Holkar: Mankoji and Sushilabai's daughter; Mahadji and Vitthoji's sister; Khanderao's first wife turned widow; Malerao and Muktabai's mother (2021–2023)
  - Aditi Jaltare as young Ahilyabai Holkar (2021)
- Rajesh Shringarpure as Subedar Malhar Rao Holkar: The King of Malwa region under the Maratha empire; Gautamabai, Dwarkabai, Banabai and Harkubai's husband; Khanderao and Seetabai's father; Malerao and Muktabai's grandfather (2021–2023) (deceased)
- Snehlata Tawde Vasaikar / Shruti Ulfat as Queen Gautama Bai Holkar: Malwa's Chief Queen; Malharrao's first wife; Khanderao's mother; Malerao and Muktabai's grandmother (2021-2022) / (2022–2023) (deceased)
- Gaurav Amlani as Khanderao Holkar: Malharrao and Gautamabai's son; Seetabai's half-brother; Ahilyabai and Parvatibai's husband; Malerao and Muktabai's father (2021–2022) (deceased)
  - Krish Chauhan as young Khanderao Holkar (2021) and Male Rao Holkar: Ahilyabai and Khanderao's son; Muktabai's brother; Mainabai's husband (2023) (deceased)
  - Diaan Talaviya as Child Malerao Holkar (2022–2023)

=== Recurring ===
- Srijana Tejveeri / Sanika Gadgill / Surabhi Hande / Gayatri Datar as Queen Harkubai Sahib Holkar: Malharrao's fourth wife, Khanderao's choti aai (2021) / (2022–2023) / (2023) / (2023)
- Sukhada Deshpande Khandkekar / Resham Tipnis as Queen Dwarkabai Sahib Holkar: Malharrao's second wife; Seetabai's mother (2021–2022) / (2022-2023) (deceased)
- Siddharth Banerjee / Sandeep Vasantrao Gaikwad as Tukoji Rao Holkar: Malhar Rao and Gautama's foster-nephew; Khanderao and Ahilya's brother-figure; Rakhmabai's husband. (2021–2023)
  - James Naivedhya Ghadge as Child Tukojirao Holkar (2021)
- Saachi Tiwari / Tanvi Sawant as Muktabai Holkar Phanse: Ahilyabai and Khanderao's daughter; Malerao's sister; Yashwantrao's wife (2023)
  - Jazlyn Tanwani as Child Muktabai Holkar (2022–2023)
- Aman Jaiswal / Vikas Singh Rajput as Yashwantrao Phanse: Muktabai's husband (2023) / (2023)
- Lateesha Dorik as Mainabai Holkar: Malerao's wife (2023)
  - Hansika Jangid as Child Mainabai (2023)
- Alihassan Turabi as Saubhag Singh Chandravat (2023) (deceased)
- Varada Patil / Trishaa Kamlakar as Seetabai Holkar: Dwarkabai and Malharrao's daughter; Khanderao's half-sister; Gunojirao's widow. (2021) / (2022–2023)
- Harsh Joshi / Kanan Malhotra as Gunojirao: Dhanajirao's son; Seetabai's husband; Malwa's ex-"sardar" (2021–2022) / (2022–2023) (deceased)
- Abhay Harpale as Gangoba Pant Tatya: Malharrao's trusted noble (2021–2023)
- Saundarya Sheth as Saraja: Ahilyabai and Renu's best friend; Dushyant's wife. (2021–2023) (deceased)
- Kamal Krishna Paudial as Dhanajirao: Gunojirao's father. (2021–2022) (deceased)
- Neil Sharma as Santaji: Malerao's sword-fighting mate. (2022)
- Vallari Viraj Londhe as Parvatibai Sahib Holkar: Gawdeji and Yashoda's daughter; Khanderao's second widow; Malerao and Muktabai's step-mother. (2022)
- Akanksha Pal as Rakhmabai Holkar: Tukoji's wife. (2021–2023)
  - Charmi Dhami as Young Rakhmabai Holkar. (2021)
- Sameer Deshpande as Mankoji Shinde: Sushilabai's husband; Mahadji, Vithoji and Ahilyabai's father; Malerao and Muktabai's grandfather. (2021–2022)
- Sulakshana Joglekar / Sangeeta Adhikari as Sushilabai Shinde: Mankoji's wife; Mahadji, Vithoji and Ahilyabai's mother; Malerao and Muktabai's grandmother. (2021) / (2022)
- Aryan Preet Mishra as Mahadji Shinde: Mankoji and Sushilabai's elder son; Vitthoji and Ahilya's brother. (2021)
- Sarthak Joshi as Vitthoji Shinde: Mankoji and Sushilabai's younger son; Mahadji and Ahilyabai's brother. (2021)
- Unknown as Krishna: Gomati's mother; Ahilyabai's therapist. (2022)
- Anjali Ujawane as Yamuna Bai: Dwarkabai's assistant. (2021–2023)
- Bhagyashree Nhalve as Banabai Sahib Holkar: Malharrao's third wife. (2021)
- Madhura Joshi as Renu: Ahilya and Sraja's best friend; Parikshit's wife. (2021)
  - Shreya Choudhary as Young Renu. (2021)
- Saundarya Seth as Sarja: Ahilya and Renu's best friend (2021–2022)
  - Snigdha Suman as Young Sarja. (2021)
- Harshit Keshawani as Kanhoji: Khanderao's childhood friend who helps him in his plans. (2021)
- Snehal Waghmare as Godabai: Rayaji's mother. (2021)
- Anonymous as Rangrao: Malhar Rao's spy. (2021–2022)
- Kajal Singh Maurya as Manjula (2021)
- Jenil Panchamia as Parikshit: Khanderao's friend; Renu's husband (2021)
- Twinkle Saini as Ramzani Bai: Khanderao's court dancer gifted to him by Madho Singh I (2022) (deceased)
- Manoj Kolhatkar as Acharya (2021)/(2022)/(2023)
- Javed Pathan as Ahmad Shah Abdali (2023)
- Pallavi Mukherjee as Kesar; Malerao's lover; Gulabbai's daughter (2023) (deceased)
- Pallavi Mukherjee as Gulab Bai; Kesar's mother (deceased)
- Krishnakant Singh Bundela as Brahmin Father

== Production ==
=== Development ===
The series was announced by Dashami Creations and was confirmed in December 2020 by Sony TV.

=== Casting ===
Marathi actress Aetashaa Sansgiri was cast to portray the elder version of Ahilya Bai. Kinshuk Vaidya was supposed to play the elder version of Khanderao, but he opted out and was replaced by Gaurav Amlani.

== Dubbed version ==
Language	Title	Original release	Network(s)	Last aired
Tamil	Ahilyabai அகில்யாபாய்	20 May 2024	Thanthi One	Ongoing

== Awards and nominations ==
Year	Award	Category	Recipient	Result	Ref.
2022	Indian Television Academy Awards	Best Actor in a Supporting Role	Rajesh Shringarpure	Nominated	
2022	Indian Television Academy Awards	Best Historical Show	Punyashlok Ahilyabai	Nominated	
2023	Indian Telly Awards	Best Actor in a Supporting Role - Jury	Rajesh Shringarpure	Won	
2023	Indian Telly Awards	Best Historical Show	Punyashlok Ahilyabai	Won	

== See also ==
- List of programs broadcast by Sony Entertainment Television
