= Alampur, Madhya Pradesh =

Alampur
- town
- Location in Madhya Pradesh, India
- Coordinates: 26.023753°N 78.785418°E
- Country: India
- State: Madhya Pradesh
- District: Bhind

Area
  - Total: 12.11 km^{2} (4.68 sq mi)
- Elevation: 159 m (522 ft)

Population (2011)
  - Total: 22,000
  - Density: 1,800/km^{2} (4,700/sq mi)

Languages
  - Official: Bundelkhandi, Hindi
- Time zone: UTC+5:30 (IST)
- PIN: 477449
- ISO 3166 code: IN-MP
- Vehicle registration: MP

Alampur is a town and a nagar panchayat in Bhind district in the Indian state of Madhya Pradesh. Alampur is known for its history, for the chhatri of Malhar Rao Holkar which is in Alampur.

== Geography ==
Alampur is located at 26.02°N 78.79°E. It has an average elevation of 159 metres (521 feet). It is 110 km from district headquarters Bhind. It is 100 km from Gwalior and 60 km from Datia.

== Demographics ==
As of 2001 India census, Alampur had a population of 9,350. Males constitute 54% of the population and females 46%. Alampur has an average literacy rate of 61%, higher than the national average of 59.5%: male literacy is 64%, and female literacy is 36%. In Alampur, 16% of the population is under 6 years of age.

== Origin of the name ==
Alampur was built on the name of Alam Shah Pavar who came here as the governor of province. No one knows about the origin of the Alampur Fortress but we can make supposition according to its architecture that this must have been built around the 14-15th century.

== History ==
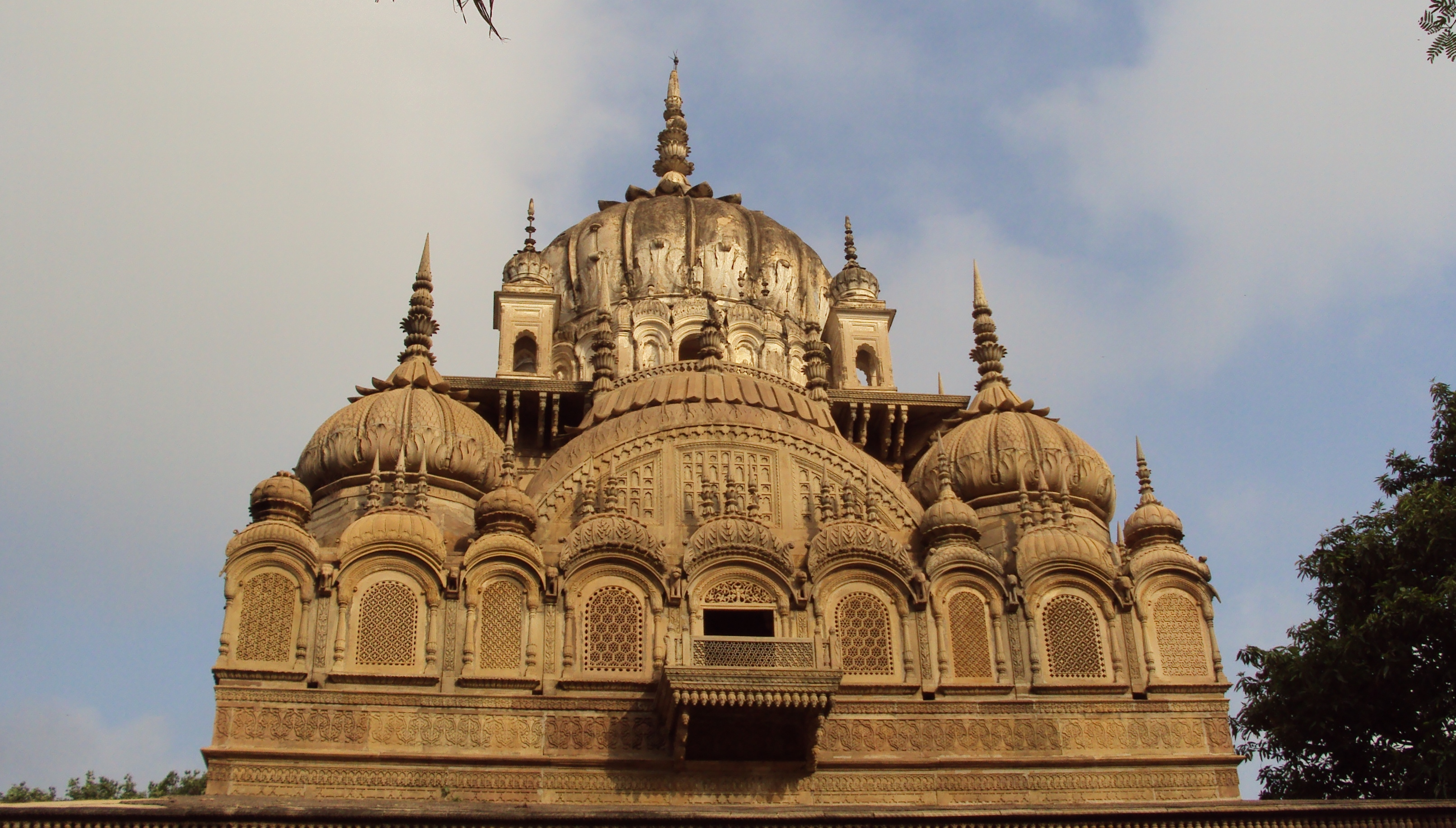
Malhar Rao Holkar's Chhatrisamadhi, built by his daughter-in-law Maharani Ahilya Bai Holkar, at Alampur

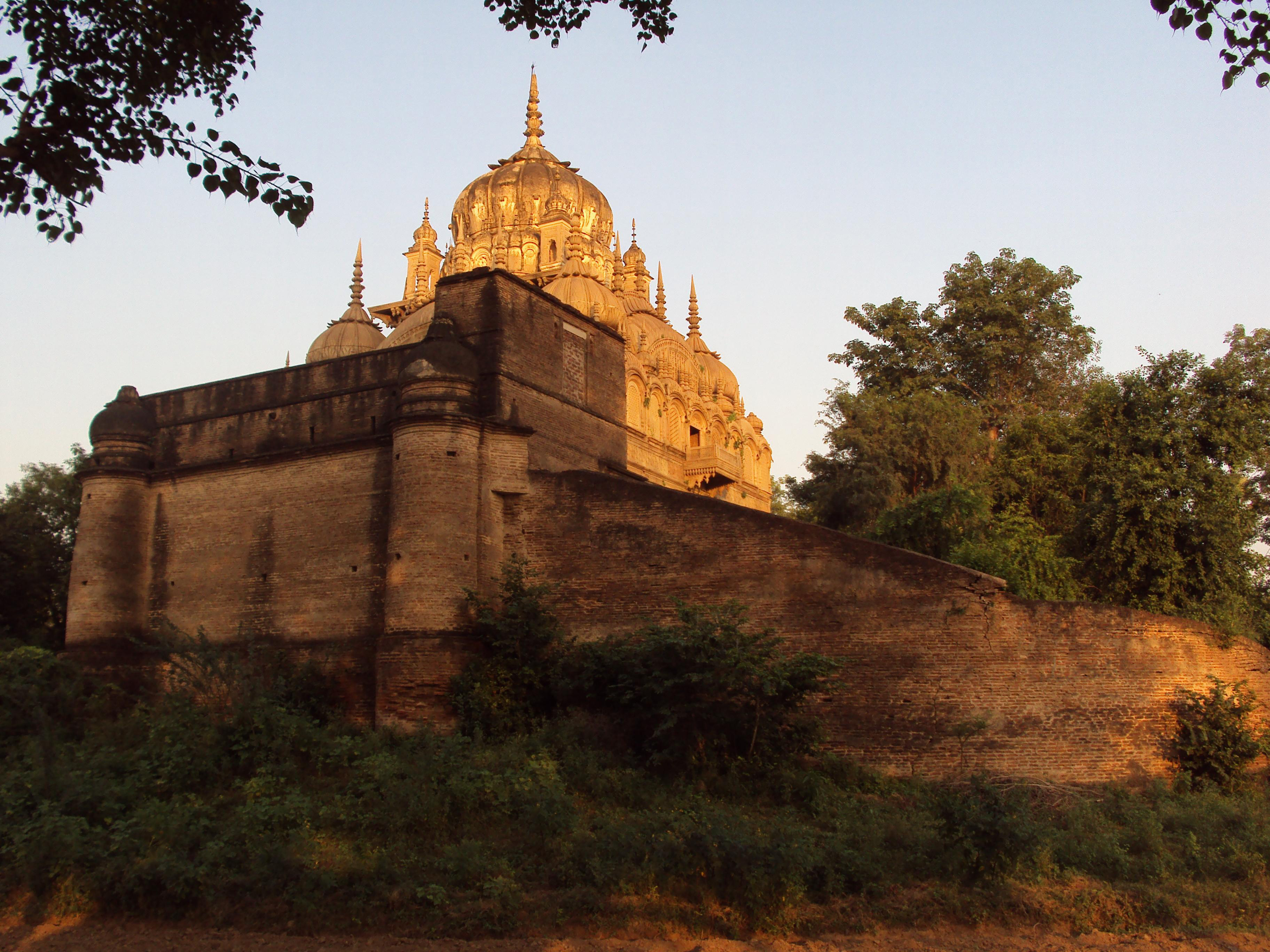
Back view of Malhar Rao Holkar's Chhatrisamadhi at Alampur

Alampur is a historical town. It was a tehsil in Indore state. It is holy land of Malhar Rao Holkar and Ahilyabai Holkar. There is an ancient chhatri of Malhar Rao Holkar and a Fortress at Alampur.

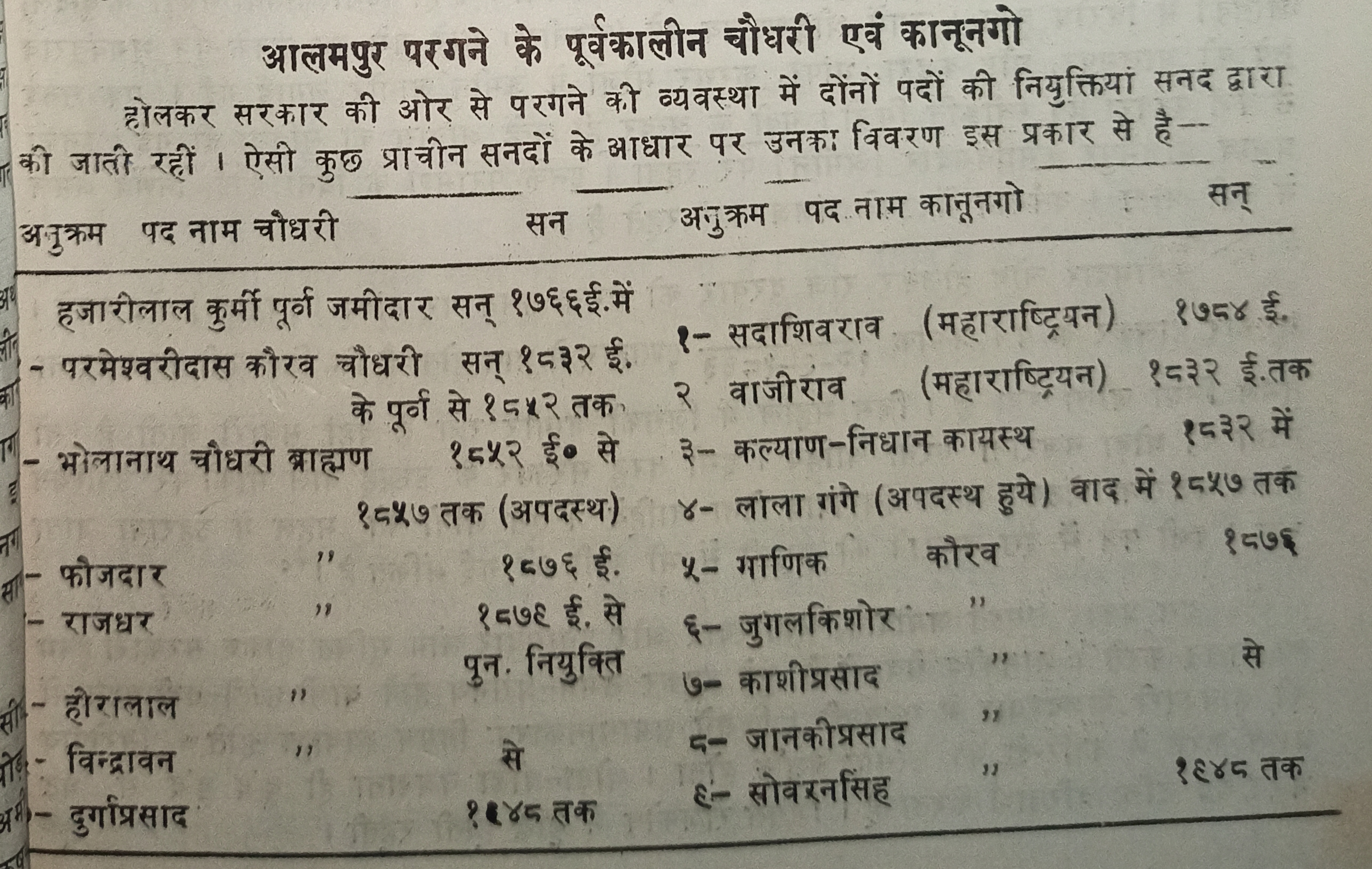

=== Alampur Pargana ===
Alampur was a small, isolated pargana belonging to Indore State but situated in the Bundelkhand Agency, Central India, with an area of 37 square miles, lying round the town of Alampur. The pargana was formed in 1766 when Malhar Rao Holkar, the founder of the house of Indore, died suddenly at the village of Alampur. To provide for the upkeep of his last resting place, 27 villages were obtained from the neighbouring chiefs of Gwalior, Datia, Jalaun, and Jhansi, and their revenues devoted to this purpose. The Rajput chiefs, from whom the villages were probably taken by force, were long opposed to the erection of the dead Maharaja's cenotaph, and destroyed it several times; finally, however, with the support of Sindhia the work was finished. The pargana was managed directly from Indore, and yielded a revenue of Rs. 59,000. The population in 1901 was 16,711, compared with 17,038 in 1891. There were 26 villages in the pargana. The largest is Alampur, also called Malharnagar, with a population (1901) of 2,843. A school, a dispensary, and a British post office were situated here.

=== Chhatri ===
Maharani Ahilya Bai Holkar built the chhatri of Malhar Rao Holkar at Alampur in Bhind district in 1766 A.D. Built on the pattern of the chhatris of Holkar rulers at Indore, the chhatri is famous for its carvings of floral and leaf patterns. The Maratha style chhatri represents a blend of shikhar dome and arch, on which Kalash has been made. The first storey of the chhatri is a pillared hall decorated with paintings. This canopy is located on the left side of the entrance of Alampur. In 1766, Malhar rao Holkar camped here during the battle with Jaat Rulers during which he died here and a canopy was built here in his memory and it is currently known as Malhar Rao Holkar Chhatri. Chatri is built on a 6-foot-high scaffold with a sanctorum in the middle and encompass a path around it founded on the pillars. Colorful carvings are on the roof of the encompassing path and vines are carved on the walls of sanctorum inspired by Iranian Style. Carvings are also on the balcony of the sanctorum (गर्भगृह) with sun on the middle of the north, east and south and a tortoise on the west balcony. Sanctorium remain above the main peak which is oval in shape amra vase (आम्र कलश) at its top. Several other peaks are around the main peak. The sanctorum also has windows all around. The wall on the left side of the canopy has statues of the ruling family with five panels of such. Some statues are also there on the walls of the canopy. At present a trust is looking after the Chhatri.

=== Fortress ===
No one knows about the origin of the Alampur Fortress but one can make supposition according to its architecture that it must have been built around the 14-15th century. There are two entrances, one east and other one north. The door at the east was the main entrance of the fortress, and it seems that the door at the north was built later. The ramparts of the fortress are damaged at present but it can be supposed that the fortress was very strong in the past. Shala Bhavan inside the fortress which looks similar to darbaar has cracks in many places but can be reinforced again after little maintenance. Currently a trust office is running at the second Building which is in good condition; possibly this was the residence of the governor of the province. A shrine and a Shiv temple are situated just in front of this building.

=== Other historical temples, monuments, and sites in Alampur ===
Harihareshwar (Badi Mata) temple, Murli Manohar Mandir, Batuk, Malharimarthand, Surya, Renuka, Ram Hanuman Temples, Shriram Temple, Laxmi Narayan Temple, Maruti Temple, Narsinh Temple, Khanderao Martand Temple, Memorial of Malhar Rao.

== People and culture ==
There is a large number of Hindus in Alampur, and Muslims also live here. Alampur is a historical town and Maharani Ahilyabai Holkar built many temples in Alampur. Major festivals are Holi, Diwali, Eid, Christmas and Raksha bandhan. Alampur is also in Bundelkhand, so there is effect of Bundelkhand's culture in Alampur.

== Administration ==
Alampur was governed by a municipality (nagar panchayat) under the Madhya Pradesh municipality act in 1978. There are 15 wards in nagar panchayat Alampur.

== Education ==
According to the census of 2001, there are 5,700 literate people in Alampur.

=== Educational institutions ===
- Govt. Boys Higher Secondary School, Alampur
- Govt. Girls High School
- Aadarsh Public School Alampur
- Anandvardhan Sanskrit Vidyapeeth
- Saraswati Higher Secondary School
- Sharda Public School
- G.P. High School
- S.S. Vidyapeeth
- Saraswati Shiksha Mandir
- City Central High School
- Rainbow High School
- Raghuvar Shiksha Academy
- Sanskar Velley Public School
- Little Flower Convent School
- Sharda Public School
- Dr.BR Ambedkar School
- Sharda Public School
- Anushka International School
- The Orient ITI College
- RITM Computer College Alampur (computer courses are BBA, BCA, DCA, PGDCA)
- Govt. Degree College Alampur (courses are B.A., M.A., B.Sc. in each subject)

== Agriculture and business ==
There is a Krisi Upaj Mandi that is one of the six Krishi Upaj Mandies in Bhind district.

== Banks ==
=== National banks ===
- State Bank of India, near bus stand Alampur.

=== Other banks ===
- Co-operative Bank
- Kisan Bachat Bank.

== Excursions ==
- Ratangarh Mata Temple - Ratangarh mata mandir is located about 21 km from Alampur,10 km from rampura village and 55 km from Datia, MP (India). This holy place is in a dense forest on the bank of Sindh river. Every year thousands of devotees come to this temple to get blessing of Maa Ratangarh Wali and Kunwar Maharaj, and every year on the day of bhai dooj (next day of Diwali) hundreds of thousands of devotees come here to get darshan of Mata and Kunwar Maharaj. This holy place can be reached from Gwalior and Datia easily.
- Shri Rawatpura sarkar Dham - The famous temple of Hindu Lord Hanuman is situated at Lahar tehsil of Bhind. Here the great Hanuman Bhakt Shri Shri 1008 Ravishankar Maharaj lives in his ashram. This place is known as Rawatpura Sarkar aashram.
- Vankhandeshwar temple - It is not too famous but it is well known in the surrounded areas. It is 1 km from Alampur. It is where Shivling appeared.
- Sankuwa Dham - A spretual place Banks of Sindh River. It's called teerth's bhanja. Kartika Purnima here Celebrating a festival. It's 18 km Away from Alampur.
