= Hingot war =

Tradition of Gautampura, Madhya Pradesh

Hingot war is an age old tradition of residents of Gautampura, about 59 km from Indore, Madhya Pradesh. It is observed on dhok padwa (a day after Diwali). In a fireball battle, commemorating the 1680–1707 Mughal– Dhangar Maratha Wars, residents of Gautampura represent the Turra army while members of Runji village represent the Kalangi army. The two sides attack each other by throwing burning hingots (a firecracker made from a hollow fruit stuffed with gunpowder).

This war came into limelight when several people died and many injured in the event. In 2014 it was reported that the custom "had been on the wane in recent times" but it was revived that year and resulted in one death and several injuries. In 2016 "nearly 65 persons were injured", in 2017, one person died and more than 36 were hurt, and the 2018 war led to 20 injuries.
