= Khanderao Holkar =

Maratha nobleman and warrior (1723–1754)

- Prince of Indore State
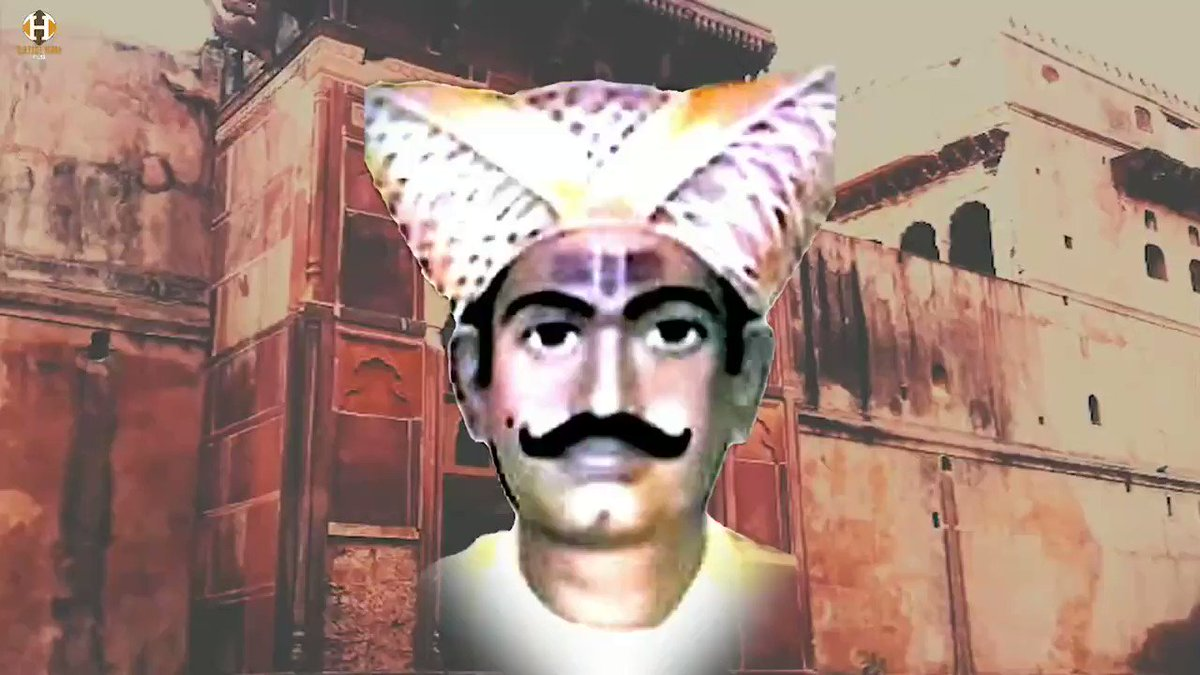
- Painting of Khanderao Holkar
- Born: 23 November 1723
- Died: 24 March 1754 (aged 30); Kumher, Bharatpur State (in-present Bharatpur District, Rajasthan, India)
- Spouse: Ahilyabai Holkar
- Issue: Male Rao Holkar; Muktabai Holkar
- House: Holkar
- Father: Malhar Rao Holkar
- Mother: Gautama Bai Holkar
- Military career
- Allegiance: Maratha Empire
- Branch: Maratha Army
- Rank: Commander in Chief
- Conflicts: Maratha-Portuguese Conflicts: Battle of Vasai; Maratha-Rohilla Conflicts: Battle of Farrukhabad; Maratha-Jat Conflicts: Battle of Kumher †; Maratha–Rajput Wars: Battle of Rajamahal

Khanderao Holkar (23 November 1723 – 24 March 1754) was the only son of Malhar Rao Holkar, the founder of the Holkar dynasty of Indore, and Gautama Bai Holkar. He was the husband of Ahilyabai Holkar. He served as a Maratha Sardar and fought several campaigns on behest of the Maratha empire.

== Life ==
Khanderao Holkar was born on 23 November 1723. He was married to Ahilyabai Holkar in 1733. Malharrao had assigned him many independent duties of settling political feuds, which occasionally arose. Khanderao had one son, Malerao, and a daughter, Muktabai with Ahilyabai. He died at age 30 in 1754 during the Battle of Kumher.

== Military campaigns ==
Khanderao Holkar participated in many wars. He fought nearly 10 battles in the 30 years of his life.

From 1735 to 1737, Khanderao accompanied his father and Baji Rao I in the North India expedition. He fought in the war between Nizam and Marathas in 1737. The same year in Malwa, the Mughals looted the Kamavisdar of Shajapur and burnt the settlement. In retaliation, Khanderao Holkar killed Mirmani Khan.

In 1739, Khanderao fought against the Portuguese. Khanderao, along with Santaji Wagh, laid siege to the fort of Tarapur. The fort was successfully captured by the Marathas.

In 1742, Khanderao played a key role in the signing of the treaty between Raja Ishwari Singh and Raja Madho Singh.

Khanderao Holkar also took part in the war of Deoli and Bagru in 1747 and 1748 respectively.

In 1750, Khanderao Holkar led campaigns against the Mughals, Rohilas, and Jats. He completed those campaigns successfully.

In 1754, when Suraj Mal was the king, the fort came under siege by Marathas, as Peshwa Balaji Baji Rao's younger brother Raghunathrao (Supported by Scindias and Holkars) wanted to be subservient to them. However, the siege did not succeed. In 1754, at the behest of Mughal Emperor Alamgir II, Khanderao laid the siege of Kumher fort of Suraj Mal of Bharatpur, who had sided with Alamgir II's adversary Siraj ud-Daulah. Khanderao Holkar, son of Malhar Rao Holkar, was inspecting his troops on an open palanquin in the battle of Kumbher when he was hit and killed by a cannonball from the Jat army. Marathas (particularly Holkars) wanted to ensue revenge on Suraj Mal for breaking the rules of ancient war and attacking. The Marathas (Holkars) though were unable to capture Suraj Mal, as ordered otherwise by the Peshwa.

== Battle and death ==
Marathas besiege the Jat fort of Kumher in 1754. They were on the verge of capturing it, just then Khanderao was killed on 24 March 1754 by a cannonball fired by the Jatt artillery hit him while inspecting his troops in an open palanquin in the battle of Kumher. After this, Jats requested the intermediation of Diwan Roop Ram Katara, who was on good terms with Jayappa Scindia. The Scindia ruler of Gwalior used his influence over Raghunathrao, brother of the Peshwa, to pressure the commander of the Maratha forces, Malharrao Holkar, into accepting a treaty with the Jats, which he did in 1754.

In Khanderao's honor, Jat Maharaja Suraj Mal built a chattri at Kumher near Deeg. After his death in 1754, his father Malhar Rao prevented Khanderao's wife Ahilya Bai from committing Sati. The Maratha army under Raghunath Rao continued the Battle of Kumher after Khanderao's death and were successful in extracting 2.3 crores as war reparations from Surajmal, only after a bond was signed for this payment, was the siege lifted. Malhar Rao died in 1766, 12 years after the death of his son Khanderao. Malhar Rao's grandson and Khanderao's young son Male Rao Holkar became the ruler of Indore in 1766, under the regency of Ahilyabai, until his death in 1767. Ahilyabai became the ruler of Indore after the death of their son. while Tukoji Rao Holkar served as the commander in chief of the Holkar army.

== Honors bestowed on Khanderao Holkar ==
Khanderao received an award from the Peshwas in 1735, at the age of twelve. Malharrao came to Pune in 1735 after completing his expedition to the north. He was accompanied by his son Khanderao Holkar.

Sanad Mauje Borgaon Taluka Pabal Province Junnar Sanad Mauje Udvadi Taluka Sandas Province Pune At the age of 12, in 1735, Khanderao became Sardeshmukh. In 1736, Bajirao demanded that the Mughal Emperor should liberate Prayag, Gaya, Kashi, and Mathura and hand them over to the Marathas. Along with this, there were other demands of Bajirao but as the emperor disapproved of them, Bajirao undertook the expedition to the north and he marched north with 50,000 troops. The Marathas succeeded in this invasion.

Apart from Subhedar Malharrao Holkar Wagh and Bule, Malharrao's uncle Bhojraj Bargal and son Khanderao Holkar were also present in Bajirao's northern expedition. Malharji had received two gold chains of 45 ounces and Khanderaoas 18 ounces of one ounce as a gift from the Peshwas.

At the age of 12, in 1735, Khanderao Malharputra became Sardeshmukh. At that time, Malharrao Holkar had come to Pune to be called as the chief of the Marathas. At that time Khanderao also came to Pune with Malharrao. The battle of Tarapur took place during this period and those who performed well in the battle were honored. On January 26, 1739, Khanderavas Peshwa honored him with the title of Shiledar.

== Legacy ==
His main samadhi chhatri is situated at Gangarsoli near Kumher & Deeg. Devi Ahilyabai also built a chhatri in remembrance of her husband Khanderao Holkar at the Chhatribagh in Indore.

== In popular culture ==
- In 2016, a TV serial titled Awaaz: Punyashlok Ahilyabai Holkar aired on Colors Marathi, Prasad Jawade played the role of Khanderao Holkar.
- In 2021, a TV serial titled "Punyashlok Ahilyabai" aired on Sony. Krish Chauhan played the role of young Khanderao followed by Gaurav Amlani who portrayed grownup Khanderao Holkar.
