= Rajesh Shringarpure =

Indian television actor

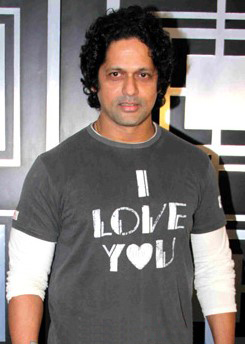
- Shringarpure in 2017
- Born: 29 October 1977 (age 48); Mumbai, Maharashtra, India
- Occupation: Actor
- Years active: 1995–present
- Spouse: Dimple Shringarpure (m. 2005)

Rajesh Shringarpure (born 29 October 1977) is an Indian film and television actor who appears in Hindi cinema and Marathi cinema.He had played the role of Malhar Rao Holkar in television serial Punyashlok Ahilyabai on which is being aired on Sony Entertainment Television.

Rajesh is best known for his negative role in Sarkar Raj. He also played an important role in Murder 3. He is known for his brawny looks. He played the role of Seleucus I Nicator in the TV series Chandragupta Maurya (2011). In 2018, Shringarpure has participated in the first season of Bigg Boss Marathi (season 1), which airs on Colors Marathi.

== Filmography ==
- 1995 – Param Vir Chakra as Army officer Rajesh (Hindi)
- 1997 – Dharma Karma (Hindi)
- 2008 – Sarkar Raj as Sanjay Somji
- 2008 – Mi Amruta Boltey (Marathi)
- 2010 – Shri Shambu Maza Navsacha (Marathi)
- 2011 – Chitkabrey – The Shades of Grey as Joginder Singh Grewal / Jaggi
- 2011 – Swarajya as Ram Pathare
- 2011- One Room Kitchen (Marathi) as Pratap
- 2012 – Matter (2012 film) as Ronnie (Marathi)
- 2012 – Chakradhar as Devraj
- 2012 – Seal Team Six: The Raid on Osama Bin Laden as CIA agent Waseem (Hollywood)
- 2013 – Murder 3 as Police officer Kabir
- 2013 – Shortcut Romeo as Rahul
- 2013 – Ek Thi Rani Aisi Bhi as Madhorao Scindia
- 2013 – Gandhi of the Month as Dr. Shailesh Nathu
- 2014 – Sangharsh as Ravi Shinde alias Bhau
- 2015 – Yudh as Guru Nayak
- 2015 – Guru Dakshina
- 2016 – Direct Ishq as Rawde Bhau
- 2016 – Kaul Manacha (Marathi)
- 2017 – Daddy as Rama Naik
- 2017 – Love Betting
- 2019 – Nashibvaan as Dhananjay Jadhav (Marathi)
- 2019 – Kulkarni Chaukatla Deshpande as Satish (Marathi)
- 2019 – Romeo Akbar Walter as Prasoon Awasthi

== Television ==
- 1999–2000 Jai Mata Ki as Agnidev / Bhagwan Vishnu
- 2000–2001 Om Namah Shivay as Arjuna
- 2001–2002 Draupadi as Arjuna
- 2001 Jaane Anjaane as Badal
- 2001–2002 Om Namo Narayan as Bhagwan Shiva
- 2001–2002 Jai Santoshi Maa as Bhagwan Shiva
- 2001–2013 Char Divas Sasuche
- 2003 Ghar Sansaar as Amit
- 2003 Shree Ganesh as Maharaj Nala
- 2004 Sahib Biwi Gulam as Bhootnath
- 2004–2008 Saarrthi as Krishna
- 2007–2008 Sangam as Shekhar Bhatia
- 2009 Basera as Sachin Deshmukh
- 2010 Ek Chutki Aasman as Ganesh
- 2010 Krishnaben Khakhrawala as Ravi Patel
- 2011 Sanskaar Laxmi as Harsukh Purohit
- 2011 Chandragupta Maurya as Seleucus I Nikator
- 2014 Encounter as Shankar "Shankya" Mane (Episode 1 – Episode 3)
- 2017 Meri Durga as Coach Rajveer Rana
- 2018 Bigg Boss Marathi (season 1) as Contestant (evicted on day 35)
- 2019 Jhansi Ki Rani as Morapant Tambe
- 2021–2023 Punyashlok Ahilyabai as Malhar Rao Holkar
- 2024 Murshid
- 2024 Lakshmi Niwas as Shrikant Inamdar
