= Vishu (film) =

- Theatrical release poster
- Directed by: Mayur Madhukar Shinde
- Screenplay by: Hrishikesh Koli
- Story by: Mayur Madhukar Shinde
- Produced by: Babu Krishna Bhoir
- Starring: Gashmeer Mahajani; Mrinmayee Godbole; Aetashaa Sansgiri
- Cinematography: Mohit Jadhav
- Edited by: Bhavesh Todankar
- Music by: Rishikesh Kamerkar
- Production company: Shree Krupa Productions
- Distributed by: AA Films
- Release date: 8 April 2022
- Country: India
- Language: Marathi

Vishu is a 2022 Indian Marathi-language film directed by Mayur Madhukar Shinde and produced by Shree Krupa Productions. The film starring Gashmeer Mahajani, Mrinmayee Godbole and Aetashaa Sansgiri. Vishu was theatrically released on 8 April 2022.

== Cast ==
- Gashmeer Mahajani as Vishu
- Mrinmayee Godbole as Arvi
- Aetashaa Sansgiri
- Aniruddha Kulkarni
- Sanjay Gurbaxani
- Millind Pathak
- Vijay Nikam
- Mansi Mohile
- Sunny Kamble

== Critical reception ==
Mihir Bhanage of The Times of India rates 2.5 and said ''Vishu is a decent attempt that falters with the execution on screen''.

== Music ==
Music and background score is by Rishikesh Kamerkar, Songs are recorded by Adarsh Shinde, Rishikesh Kamerkar, Neha Rajpal, Sonal Naik and Veena Joshi. Lyrics are written by Mangesh Kangane.

== Release ==
Teaser of the film was released on 14 March and trailer on 21 March 2022.

The film was theatrically released on 8 April 2022.
