= Battle of Sikandarabad =

1760 Afghan-Maratha battle in India

- Part of The Afghan–Maratha conflicts
| Date | 4 March 1760 |
| Location | Sikandrabad |
| Result | Durrani victory |

Belligerents
| Durrani Empire; Kingdom of Rohilkhand | Maratha Empire |

Commanders and leaders
| Ahmad Shah; Sardar Jahan Khan; Najib Khan | Malharro Holkar |

Strength
| Unknown | Unknown |

Casualties and losses
| Unknown | Unknown |

The Battle of Sikandrabad was a military engagement between the Afghan Durranis and the Marathas near the city of Sikandrabad.

== Prelude ==
Jankoji Sindhia led the Marathas after their defeat at Barari Ghat and soon rendezvoused with the retreating families that were heading for Rewari. They reached Kotputli on January 15, where he met Malhar Rao Holkar and voluntarily handed him the command of the Maratha army on 24 January, Holkar ordered the Marathas to return to Delhi and engage the invading Afghans until the arrival of reinforcements. A Maratha contingent was defeated by Jahan Khan near Rewari on 11 February.

== Battle ==
The Maratha troops led by Holkar sighted the Afghans in the vicinity of Bahadurgarh and forced the Afghans to retreat to Delhi. Upon learning of their approach, Holkar bypassed the city and entered Ganga Doab by crossing the Yamuna river. On the night of 26–27 February, he learned that the Afghans had entered Delhi two days earlier. He sacked the town of Sikandrabad on March 1, Holkar spent 3–4 days attempting to find a ford to cross the Ganga river into Rohilkhand for loot and plunder. However, while retreating to Delhi, Abdali was kept informed of the Marathas' march. The advance guard of the Marathas was caught and annihilated. The defeat panicked Holkar into a retreat towards Agra.

== Aftermath ==
With Holkar's defeat, the victorious Afghans marched to Aligarh and encamped there, in order to prepare for another fresh Maratha army coming from Deccan as advised by Najib ad-Dawlah. The Marathas captured Delhi on August 1, which led to the Third Battle of Panipat.

== Sources ==
- Mehta, Jaswant Lal (2005-01-01). Advanced Study in the History of Modern India 1707-1813. Sterling Publishers Pvt. Ltd. ISBN 978-1-932705-54-6.
