= Chondi =

Chondi Chaundi
- Village
- Location in Maharashtra, India
- Coordinates: 18.72°N 75.32°E
- Country: India
- State: Maharashtra
- District: Ahilyanagar
- Taluka: Jamkhed

Government
  - Type: Grampanchayat

Population (2011)
  - Total: 2,668

Language
  - Official: Marathi
- Time zone: UTC+5:30 (IST)
- Postal code: 413205
- Vehicle registration: MH-17

The village Chondi or Chaundi, the birthplace of Punyashlok Rajmata Ahilyadevi Holkar, is in Jamkhed taluka of district Ahilyanagar. The state government of Maharashtra has decided to develop Chondi as a national memorial.

It is on the Ahilyanagar-Beed State Highway, 78 kilometres from Ahilyanagar.
