= Aetashaa Sansgiri =

Indian television actress (born 1994)

- Born: Aetasha Sansgiri
- Occupations: Actress; model
- Years active: 2018–present
- Known for: Choti Malkein; Punyashlok Ahilyabai; Kaali Maati; Vishu
- Spouse: Nishad Bhoir (m. 2025)

Aetashaa Sansgiri is an Indian actress and model who primarily works in Marathi and Hindi television along with Marathi films. Sansgiri is best known for her portrayal of Ahilyabai Holkar in Sony TV's historical drama series Punyashlok Ahilyabai.

== Career ==
Sansgiri made her acting debut in 2018 with the Marathi serial Choti Malkin. She played the role of Revati opposite Akshar Kothari. The show ended in 2019. In 2019, she appeared as Annapurneshawari, in her web debut series, Majhya Mitrachi Girlfriend.

She played Yamai Devi in Marathi serial, Dakkhancha Raja Jyotiba from 2020 to 2021. She also played Saara in her Hindi web debut series, Chal Yaar Goa Chalte Hain. It released on Viral Kekda and MX Player.

Sansgiri made her film debut in 2021, with the Marathi film Kaali Maati as Pooja opposite Omprakash Shinde. She then appeared in the short film An Unusual Day as a thief.

Sansgiri made her Hindi TV debut Punyashlok Ahilyabai in 2021. Since 2021, she is portraying Ahilyabai Holkar opposite Gaurav Amlani which proved as a major turning point in her career and earned her recognition.

She portrayed Teela in the 2022 Marathi film Vishu, alongside Gashmeer Mahajani and Mrinmayee Godbole. A Times of India reviewer complimented her performance.

Since January 2024, she is seen portraying Nivedita in Nivedita Majhi Tai opposite Ashok Phal Desai.

== Filmography ==
=== Films ===
- All films are in Marathi unless otherwise noted.

Year	Title	Role	Notes	Ref.
2021	Kaali Maati	Pooja		
2021	An Unusual Day	Thief	Hindi film	
2022	Vishu	Teela		
2022	Daagadi Chawl 2	Poorva Patil		

=== Television ===
- All shows are in Marathi unless otherwise noted.

Year	Title	Role	Notes	Ref.
2018–2019	Choti Malkin	Revati		
2020	Raja Ranichi Ga Jodi	Vibha		
2020–2021	Dakkhancha Raja Jyotiba	Yamai Devi		
2021–2023	Punyashlok Ahilyabai	Ahilyabai Holkar	Hindi show	
2024	Nivedita Majhi Taai	Nivedita		
2026	Tuzya Sobatine	Nupur		

=== Web series ===
Year	Title	Role	Notes	Ref.
2019	Majhya Mitrachi Girlfriend	Annapurneshawari	Marathi series	
2020	Chal Yaar Goa Chalte Hain	Saara	Hindi series	

== Awards and nominations ==
Year	Award	Category	Work	Result	Ref.
2022	Gold Awards	Best Actress in a Leading Role	Punyashlok Ahilyabai	Nominated	
2022	Gold Awards	Debut in a Lead Role - Female	Punyashlok Ahilyabai	Nominated	
2022	Gold Awards	Best Onscreen Jodi (with Gaurav Amlani)	Punyashlok Ahilyabai	Nominated	

== See also ==
- List of Hindi television actresses
- Actresses in Marathi television
