= Tukoji Rao Holkar =

Maharaja of Indore from 1795 to 1797

Tukoji Rao I Holkar
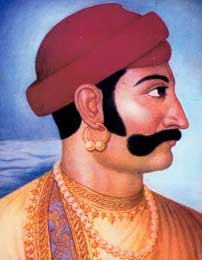
- Portrait of Tukoji Rao, early 19th century

4th Holkar Ruler of Indore
- Reign: 13 August 1795 –; 15 August 1797
- Predecessor: Ahilyabai Holkar
- Successor: Kashi Rao Holkar

Commander-in-Chief of Indore
- Years of Service: 1767 – 1795
- Born: 26 June 1723
- Died: 15 August 1797 (aged 74); Pune, Maharashtra, India
- Spouses: Rakhmabai Holkar; Radhabai Holkar
- Issue: Kashi Rao Holkar; Vithoji Rao Holkar; Yashwant Rao Holkar; Malhar Rao II Holkar
- House: Holkar
- Father: Malhar Rao Holkar (adoptive); Tanuji Holkar (biological)
- Military career
- Allegiance: Maratha Empire
- Rank: Senapati
- Conflicts: See list: Maratha-Rohilla Conflicts; Farrukhabad (1751); Afghan-Maratha War; Peshawar (1758); Delhi (1760); Kunjpura (1760); Panipat (1761); Delhi (1771); Purana Qila (1772); First Anglo-Mysore War; Gajendragad (1786); First Anglo-Maratha War; Wadgaon (1779); Bhorghat (1781); Maratha-Nizam War; Kharda (1795)

Tukoji Rao I Holkar (26 June 1723 – 15 August 1797) was the Maharaja of Indore from 1795 until his death in 1797. Belonging to the Holkar clan, Tukoji was the great-nephew and adoptive son of dynastic founder Malhar Rao. He served as commander of forces for 27 years before briefly occupying the throne.

== Life and career ==
Upon the death of Ahilyabai Holkar in August 1795, Tukoji Rao Holkar succeeded her as the Maharaja of Indore, reigning until his death in August 1797. Tukoji Rao assumed full leadership of the principality during a period of significant political transition within the Maratha Empire. Contemporary records identify Tukoji Rao as a commander under Malhar Rao Holkar; historical accounts suggest that Malhar Rao had designated him to support the administration and protect his grandson, Male Rao Holkar. Following the death of Male Rao on 13 March 1767, Tukoji Rao served under Ahilyabai Holkar, managing the military affairs of the Holkar state while she oversaw civil administration in Malwa. As the adopted son of Malhar Rao Holkar I, he was considered a member of the ruling family.

Throughout Ahilyabai's reign, Tukoji Rao served as Commander-in-Chief, overseeing both military operations and various administrative duties. During this period, the Holkar State maintained a level of economic stability that persisted into the first years of his independent reign. He was a significant participant in the Maratha conquest of North-west India, commanding forces in the Punjab region and participating in actions at Lahore, Attock, and Peshawar. Historical records indicate his involvement in operations against Afghan forces near Jalalabad. Following the Maratha defeat at the Third Battle of Panipat, he played a role in the Maratha Resurrection and the First Anglo-Maratha War. During this time, political friction increased between Tukoji Rao and Mahadaji Scindia regarding their respective spheres of influence in North India.

In 1771, following the Maratha capture of Delhi, the Mughal Emperor Shah Alam II left Allahabad under Maratha protection to return to his capital. He was escorted by Mahadaji Shinde, departing Allahabad in May 1771. During this period, Maratha presence in Allahabad led to the construction of religious structures, including the Alopi Devi Mandir. By early 1772, tensions arose between the Emperor and the Marathas over territorial control. In response, Tukoji Rao Holkar and Visaji Krushna Biniwale led an assault on Delhi, defeating the Mughal forces. This resulted in the Marathas receiving an imperial sanad for Kora and Allahabad. Subsequent attempts to secure these territories led to conflict with the Nawab of Oudh and British forces. The Maratha campaign at the Battle of Ramghat was ultimately curtailed by internal political instability in Pune following the death of the Peshwa.

Tukoji Rao I died on 15 August 1797. He is noted for continuing the administrative traditions established by Malhar Rao; historical accounts record that he did not use a personal seal, preferring to maintain the continuity of the established Holkar lineage.

== In popular culture ==
- In the 1994 Hindi TV series The Great Maratha, Tukoji's character was portrayed by Sanjay Mahendirata.
- In 2021-22 Hindi TV series Punyashlok Ahilyabai, James Naivedhya Ghadge played the role of young Tukoji Rao Holkar followed by Siddharth Bannerjee initially and then Sandeep Vasantrao Gaikwad.

Tukoji Rao Holkar Holkar Dynasty Born: 1723 Died: 15 August 1797
Regnal titles
Preceded by Ahilya Bai Holkar	Maharaja of Indore; 1795 – 1797	Succeeded by Kashi Rao Holkar
