= Ahilyabai Holkar =

Queen of the Malwa kingdom (1725–1795)

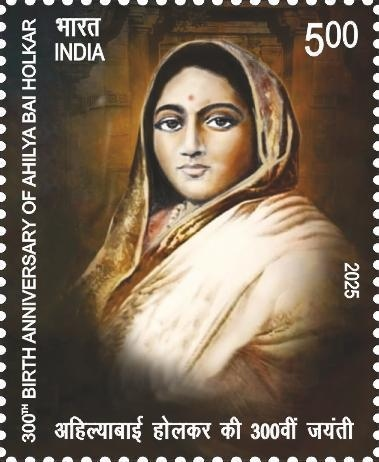
- Ahilyabai Holkar on a 2025 stamp of India

Maharani of Indore
- Reign: 1 December 1767 – 13 August 1795
- Coronation: 11 December 1767
- Predecessor: Malhar Rao Holkar
- Successor: Tukoji Rao Holkar

Regent of Indore
- Regency: 20 May 1766 – 5 April 1767
- Subedar: Malhar Rao Holkar II
- Born: 31 May 1725; Chondi, Maratha Empire (present-day Ahmednagar district, Maharashtra, India)
- Died: 13 August 1795 (aged 70); Rajwada, Indore, Indore State, Maratha Empire (present-day, Madhya Pradesh, India)
- Spouse: Khanderao Holkar
- Issue: Male Rao Holkar (son); Muktabai (daughter)
Names
- Ahilya Bai Sahiba Holkar
- House: Holkar
- Father: Mankoji Shinde
- Mother: Sushila Shinde
- Religion: Hinduism

Ahilyabai Holkar (Marathi pronunciation: [əɦɪljɑbaɪ]; 31 May 1725 – 13 August 1795), also spelled Ahalya Bai, Rajmata Ahilyabai Holkar was the Holkar Queen of the Malwa kingdom. She was later ruling queen of Indore within the Maratha Empire. She established Maheshwar (in Madhya Pradesh) as the seat of the Holkar Dynasty.

Maharani Ahilyabai Holkar is renowned for good governance, along with educational and cultural development. She commissioned a number of temples, Ghats, Pathasalas, and Dharmshalas as socio-cultural projects, while also contributing to the growth of Indian architecture. After the deaths of her husband Khanderao Holkar and father-in-law Malhar Rao Holkar, Ahilyabai undertook the affairs of the Holkar dynasty. She defended Indore against invasions and personally led armies into battle, with her brother-in-law Tukoji Rao Holkar serving as her military commander.

She is widely revered across India as one of the legendary queens of the Maratha Malwa kingdom, who has a notable legacy of public welfare, education, and socio-cultural development. Ahilyabai's Matha, or charitable endowments, spread across India. She is also remembered as a Sadhvi, or holy woman, and widely referred to as Devi Ahilya.

In 2025, her 300th birth anniversary was widely celebrated across India, and she was remembered for her contributions to Hindu cultural institutions, including the rebuilding of the Kashi Vishwanath Temple in Varanasi. She is also remembered for her commitment to women's education and empowerment, including women-led traditional textile initiatives such as the Maheshwari sarees.

== Early life and marriage ==
Ahilyabai was born into a Marathi Dhangar family to Mankoji Shinde and Sushila Shinde in Maharashtra in the village of Chandi, now Ahilyanagar district. Her father was a descendant of a respected Dhangar Gadaria caste family. Mankoji Shinde served as the Patil of the village. Ahilyabai had five brothers and was first educated at home.

Ahilyabai rose to prominence when Malhar Rao Holkar, a commander in the army of Maratha Peshwa Baji Rao I and ruler of Malwa, stopped in Chandi on his way to Pune and saw her at a temple service. Impressed by the child's piety and character, Malhar advised his son, Khanderao, to marry her. They were wed in 1733 when he was nine or ten and she was seven or eight. 21 years after her marriage, her husband Khanderao died during the siege of the Kumher Fort. In 1766,Her father-in-law, Malhar Rao passed away, and in the following year, she lost her son, Male Rao.

== Family's rise to prominence ==
By the time of Ahilyabai's marriage, her father-in-law Malhar Rao Holkar had already risen from a childhood of shepherding to ruling as Subahdar over a territory comprising thirty parganas yielding high revenues. From 1748, Malhar Rao's power in Malwa allowed him to play kingmaker in northern and central India and by 1750, he was the de facto ruler of the Maratha Confederacy. He regularly received grants, including monetary tributes, land, and noble titles, from the Peshwa government in recognition of his service to the empire. His land lay north of the Narmadha on both sides of Sahyadri. In 1751, he successfully mediated a major land agreement between the Peshwa and Mughal emperor Ahmad Shah Bahadur and by 1753, he was considered indispensable.

== Education and military expertise ==
Starting in 1754, Malhar Rao kept Ahilyabai actively involved in diplomacy debates, matters of the kingdom's finances, and other problems of both the Mughal Empire and the Peshwa. Throughout her married life, she was brought up by her mother-in-law, Gautama Bai Holkar, who is credited for teaching Ahilyabai to have proper values. She trained her in administration, accounts, and politics and, in 1759, gave Ahilyabai her khasgi, or land grant.

Ahilyabai's trust from her father-in-law and her military expertise are both demonstrated by a 1765 letter he wrote her during an invasion of Punjab by a Durrani Empire-Rohilla dynasty coalition led by Emperor Ahmad Shah Durrani. Malhar Rao, who was fighting in Delhi, commanded her to take heavy artillery on a military expedition to Gwalior and attack the fort at Gohad:

"...proceed to Gwalior after crossing the Chambal. You may halt there for four or five days. You should keep your big artillery and arrange for its ammunition as much as possible... The big artillery should be kept at Gwalior and you should proceed further after making proper arrangements for it's expenses for a month. On the march you should arrange for military posts to be located for protection of the road."

Ahilbayai's attack was successful.

== Khanderao's death and aftermath ==
In 1754, Khanderao and Malhar Rao, acting on orders from Mughal Grand Vizier Ghazi ud-Din Khan Feroze Jung III, laid siege to the fort at Kumher, then held by Jat Raja Suraj Mal. Suraj Mal had sided with Safdar Jang, another Mughal vazier who had rebelled against the emperor. Khanderao was inspecting his troops in an open palanquin when he was killed by cannon fire.

Devastated by Khanderao's death, Alhiyabai announced she would commit sati, ritualistic suicide on his funeral pyre. Her dismayed subjects begged her to reconsider but she explained that she felt sati was the only way she could fulfill her husband's promise to accompany her all her life. Her father-in-law Malhar Rao begged:

"Daughter, my son left me whom I raised with a hope that he would support me in my old age. Now, will you also leave me, an old man, alone to be drowned in the fathomless ocean? ... Will you also leave me without any support? Still, if you don't want to change your mind, let me die first."

This convinced her to choose to live and Malhar Rao thereupon began to train her in military affairs. He died on 20 May 1766 in Alampur.

== Reign ==
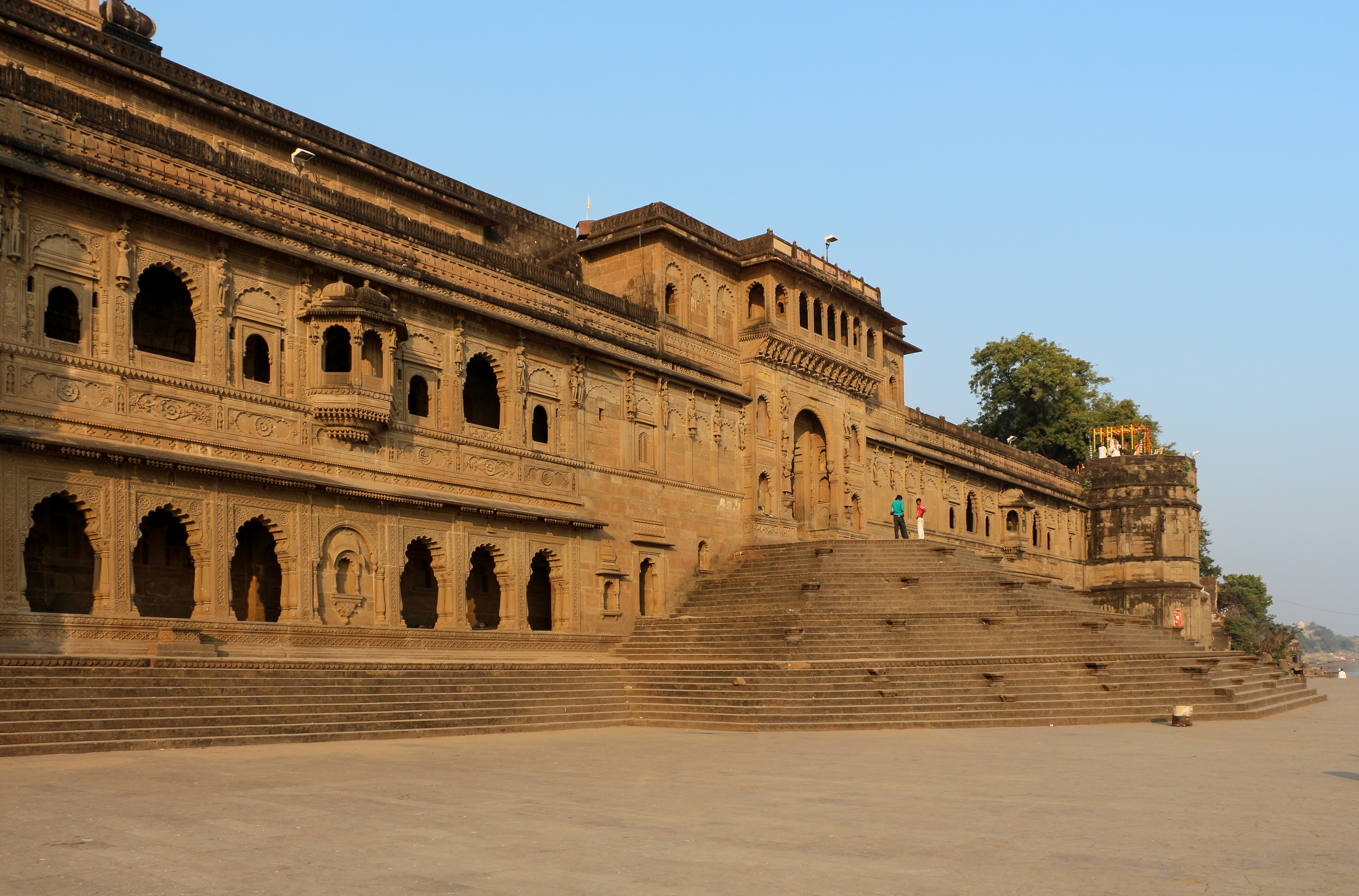
Maheshwar Fort

On 23 August 1766, Ahilyabai's only son, Male Rao Holkar, became ruler of Indore at the age of 21 when he received investiture from the Peshwa. Male Rao had reigned for just over six months when he died on 5 April 1767. Malhar Rao's adopted son Tukoji Rao Holkar was then made Subahdar on the payment of a large tribute of Indian rupees and Ahilyabai became the de facto ruler.

Historical records show that groups from neighboring states, particularly the Chundawat clan of Jaipur, rebelled during this transfer of power, taking advantage of both Tukoji Rao's absence from the region and the widespread devastation wrought by the Third Battle of Panipat and its aftermath. Ahilyabai led Maratha armies against these rebellions and, despite a lack of resources and aid, won every battle.

In 1791, Ahilyabai's son-in-law, Yeshwantrao Fanse, died and her daughter Muktabai committed sati on his funeral pyre.

== Administration ==
In those times, the state's administration was two-sided, military and civil. The military side was again bifurcated, Tukoji Rao Holkar was the Subedar, and he had to serve the Maratha. Devi Ahilyabai was outspoken, proclaiming her power by declaring, "I am the daughter-in-law of Malhar Rao". The Saranjamdar system established by Malhar Rao was efficient and was recognized by the Puna authorities. Saranjamdar was a "camp within a camp" complete by itself. The state records involuntarily reveal the diplomatic and administrative skills exhibited by Devi. Justice administration was soft but speedy, practical yet spiritual, restraining yet re-forming.

She transformed Indore into a progressive city, and built industries and universities. The government of India issued a stamp on 25 August 1996 in celebration of her 200th death anniversary. The Indore airport is named after her. The city of Indore named the university Devi Ahilya Vishwavidyalaya. Not merely in her state but indeed in other parts of India she is credited with promoting activities including repair and additions to several famous temples such as Kashi Viswanath Mandir at Varanasi, Gouri Somnath Mandir at Chola and the construction of the famous Dashashwamedh Ghat at Banaras.

== Charities and endowments ==
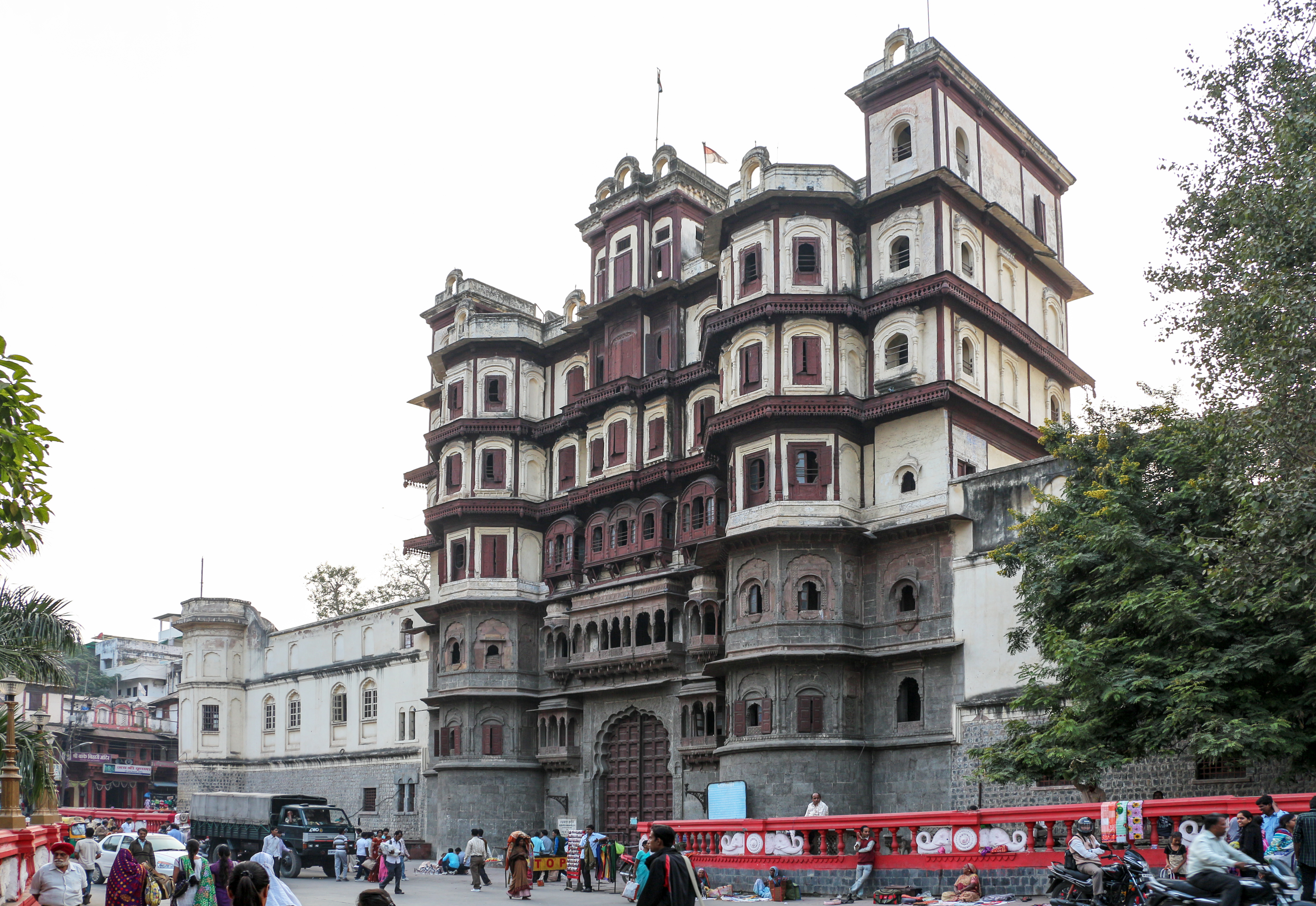
The Rajwada Palace was the official residence of the Holkars during the reign of Ahilyabai.

The Holkar family was known for avoiding using public cash to meet their personal and family expenses. They possessed their personal funds, which they had accumulated through their private property. Ahilyabai inherited personal funds estimated at sixteen crores rupees at that time. Ahilyabai donated money from her personal resources to charity. The charities of the Devi Ahilyabai in her territory as well as throughout the Bharata Kanda are too well known. A well-documented account of the expenditure can be found in the "Devasthan classification list 1923 by the Holkar government". The Holkar government appointed a "Devastahan officer" who travelled far and wide and collected information on the spot.

The arrangements made by Devi Ahilya at all the sacred were shown in the below table

Charities connected with the Jyotir-Lingas

Sl No	Name of the Linga	Geographical situation.	Description of charity.	Authority for statement.
1	Shree Somanath	Kathiawad, on the sea side.	In 1786 A. D. The idol was re-installed	Maheshwar Durbar Batmipatre. Part II, P.87
2	Shree Mallikarjuna	Dist. Karnul Madras Presidency.	Temple was built.	State Record.
3	Shree Omkareshwar	Central India (on the Narbada bank.)	House for Drums, Flower-garden, Palanquin, Boat, Silver-idol	State Record.
4	Shree Vaijnath	Nizam's State	In 1784 A. D. The temple was re-built.	Bharat Itihasa Shanshodliak Mandal Report Shak 1834, Bhadrapad Number.
5	Shree Nageshwar	Nizam's State	In 1784 A, D. Annual payment of Rs. 81/- for 1 worship.	State Record.
6	Shree Vishwanath	Benares	(1) Mankarnikaghat (2) Re-installation of Kashi- Vishwanath. (3) 6 Private temples. (4) Temple of the Ganges and 3 temples on the Ghat. (5) Shree Tarkeshwar temple. (6) Dashashwamedh Ghat (7) Female Mankarnika Ghat (8) Dharmashala Rameshwar (9) Dharmashala Kapildhara (10) 9 Private Bungalows (11) Garden-field (12) Plinth on Shitala Ghat (13) Dharmashala Uttar Kashi (14) Establishment of Bramha-puri	State Record.
7	Shree Trimbakeshwar	Nasik District.	Bridge of Kushawarta-Ghat	State Record.
8	Shree Grishneshwar	Verul Nizam's State	Re-built Shivalaya Tirth.	Bharat I.S.M. R. Shak 1838,
9	Shree Gokarna	On the Western sea. Madras Presidency.	(1) Alms-House.	State Record.
10	Shree Mahakaleshwar	Ujjain (Central India)	Worship of the Linga on the Mahashivratra night, and food distribution on the day following.	State Record.
11	Shree Rameshwar	Madras Presidency.	Alms-House. Wells. Shree Radha-Krishna temple.	State Record.
12	Shree Bhima-Shankar	Bombay Presidency.	Alms-House,	State Record.

== Sapta Puri and Char Dham ==
Sapta Puri (seven cities) and Char Dham (four quarters) were looked up eventually by Hindus of all castes and creeds in worship and pilgrimage.

Dwarka: she built a Almshouse

Ujjain(Avantika): she built four Mandir and a charitable building

Kanchipuram: Ganga water annually sent

Mathura: she built a Mandir 2 Ghat and one charitable building

Ayodhya: She built 4 Ram Mandir and 3 charitable buildings

Haridwar(Maya): a Ghat and a charitable house

Varanasi: Refer the above table

=== Char Dhama – four quadrants of Aryavarta ===
Badrinath: 5 Dharmashalas and eight charity buildings

Jagnath (Puri): A temple, Almhouse and garden land

== Conclusion ==
Here we see the various charities of Devi Ahilyabai extending throughout the length and breadth of Bharatakhanda. In the book HOLKAR STATE HISTORY VOL. II Life and Life's-Work of Devi Shree Ahilyabai ( 1725–1795 A. D.)page 42 there are worship expenses

Various temples Ghats and rest houses built during her time exhibit Indian architecture and the various features of different schools. They became so many training grounds for young Indian architecture. Not only in her territory but throughout the whole of India. The aspects of Devi Ahilyabai charity reveal and resuscitation of Thirthas and Kshetras.

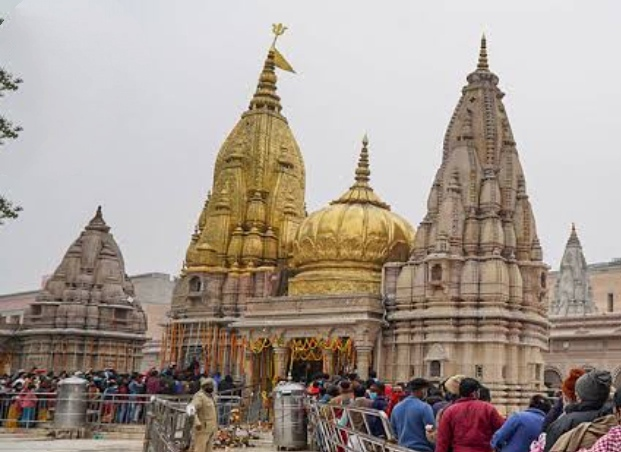
Current Kashi Vishwanath Temple built by Ahilyabai in 1780.

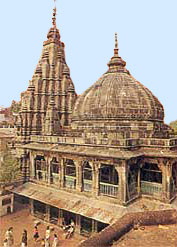
The current structure of Vishnupad Temple, Gaya, Bihar is built by Maharani Ahilyabai Holkar in 1787

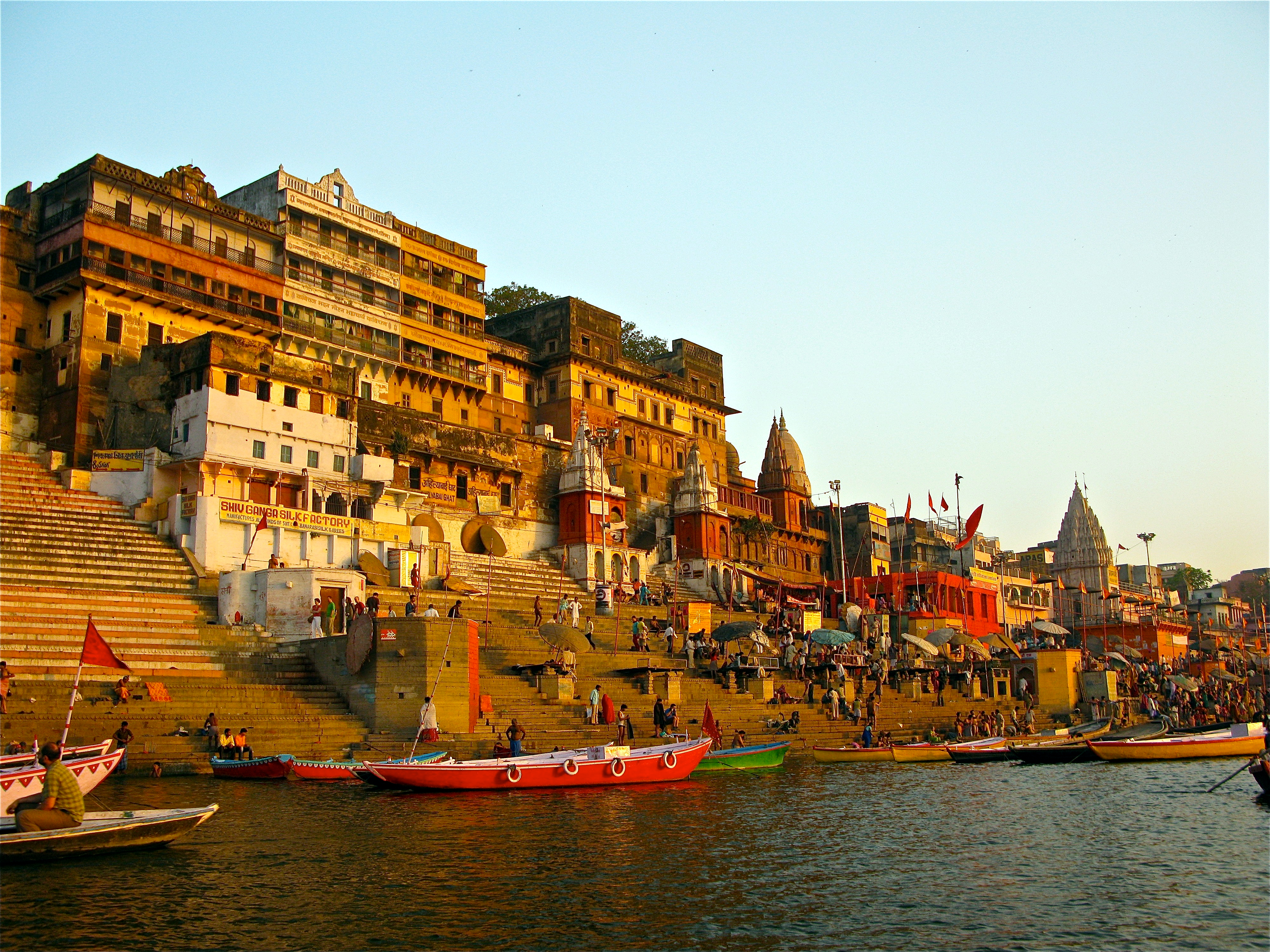
Ahilya Ghat, Varanasi

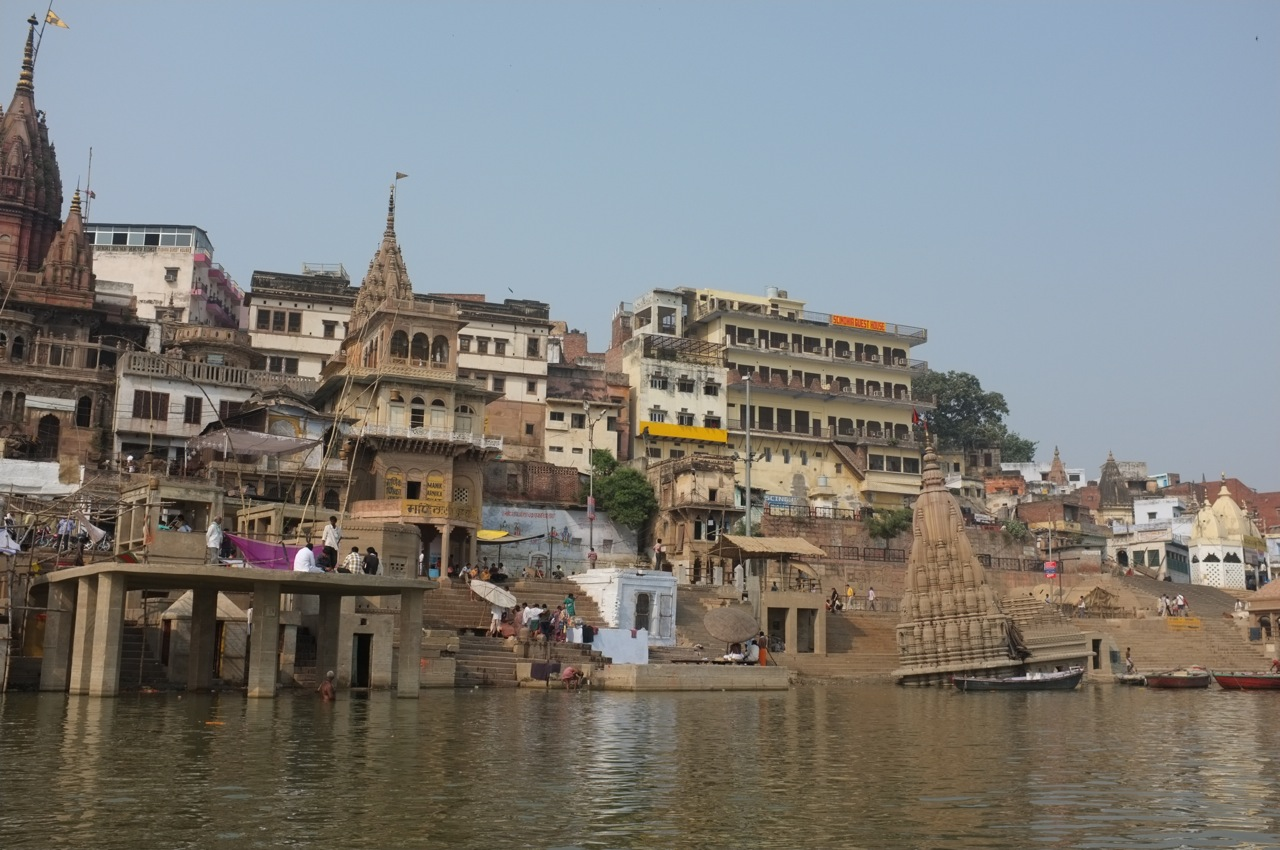
Manikarnika Ghat in varanasi

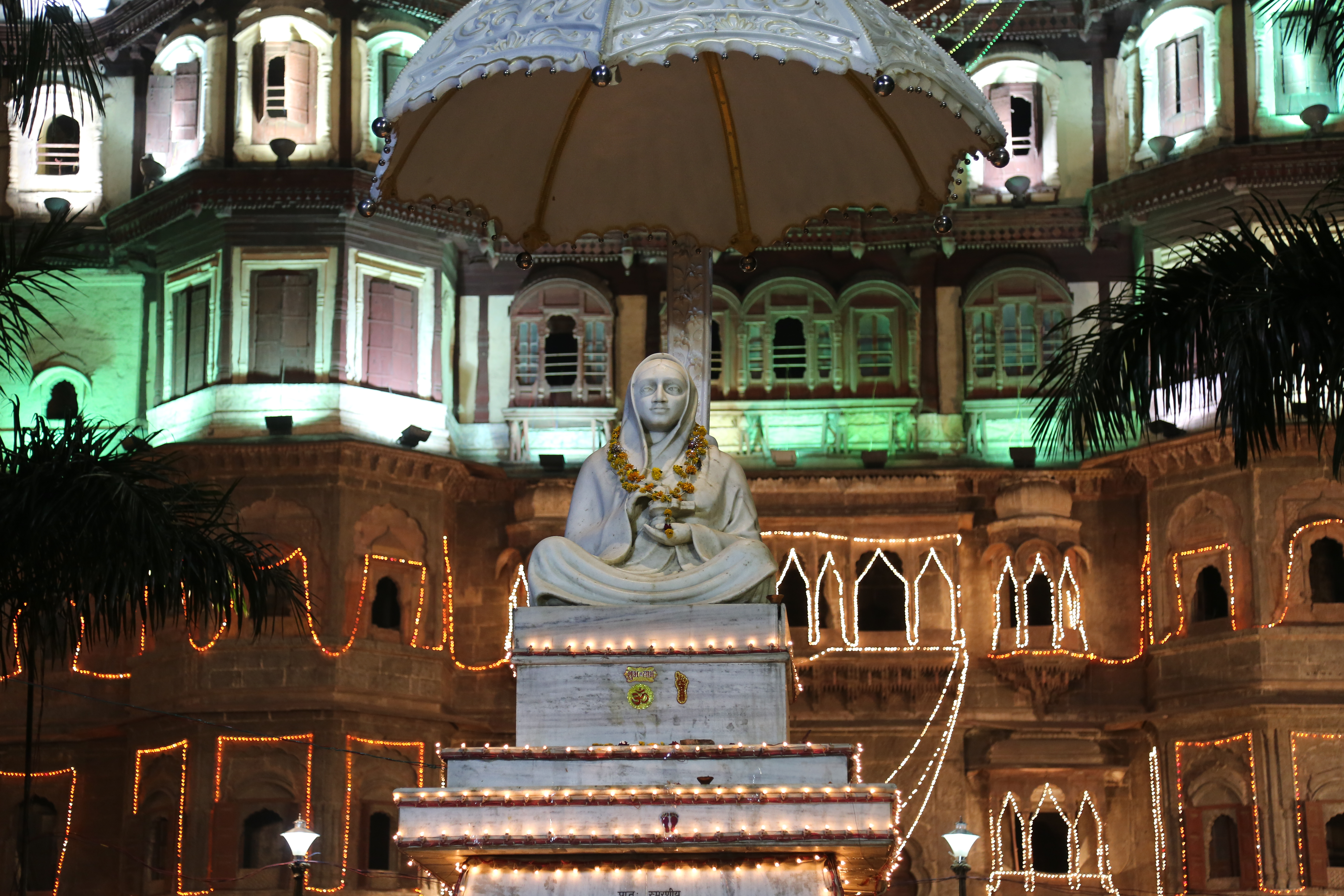

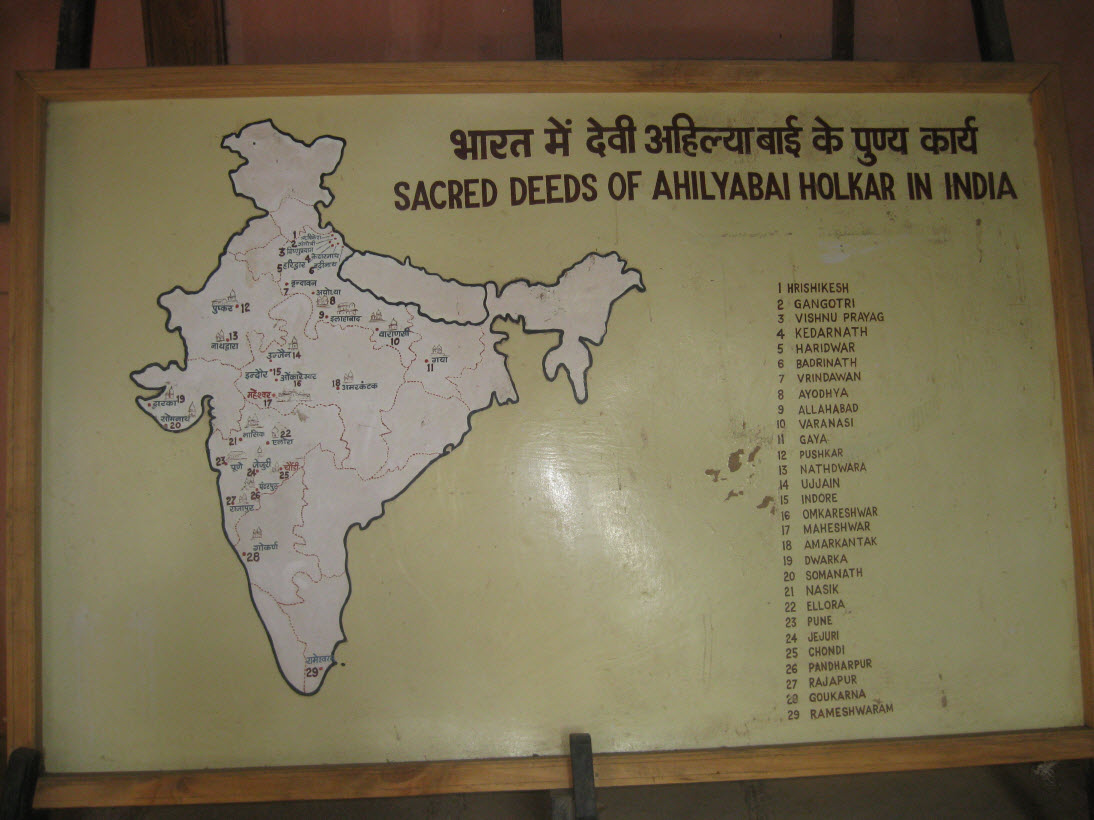

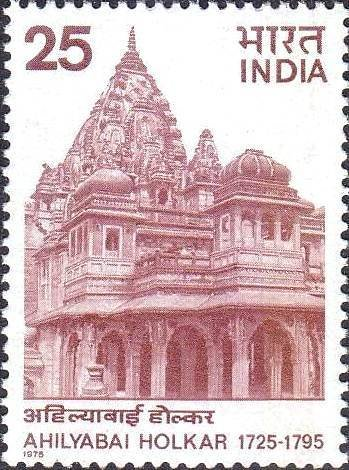

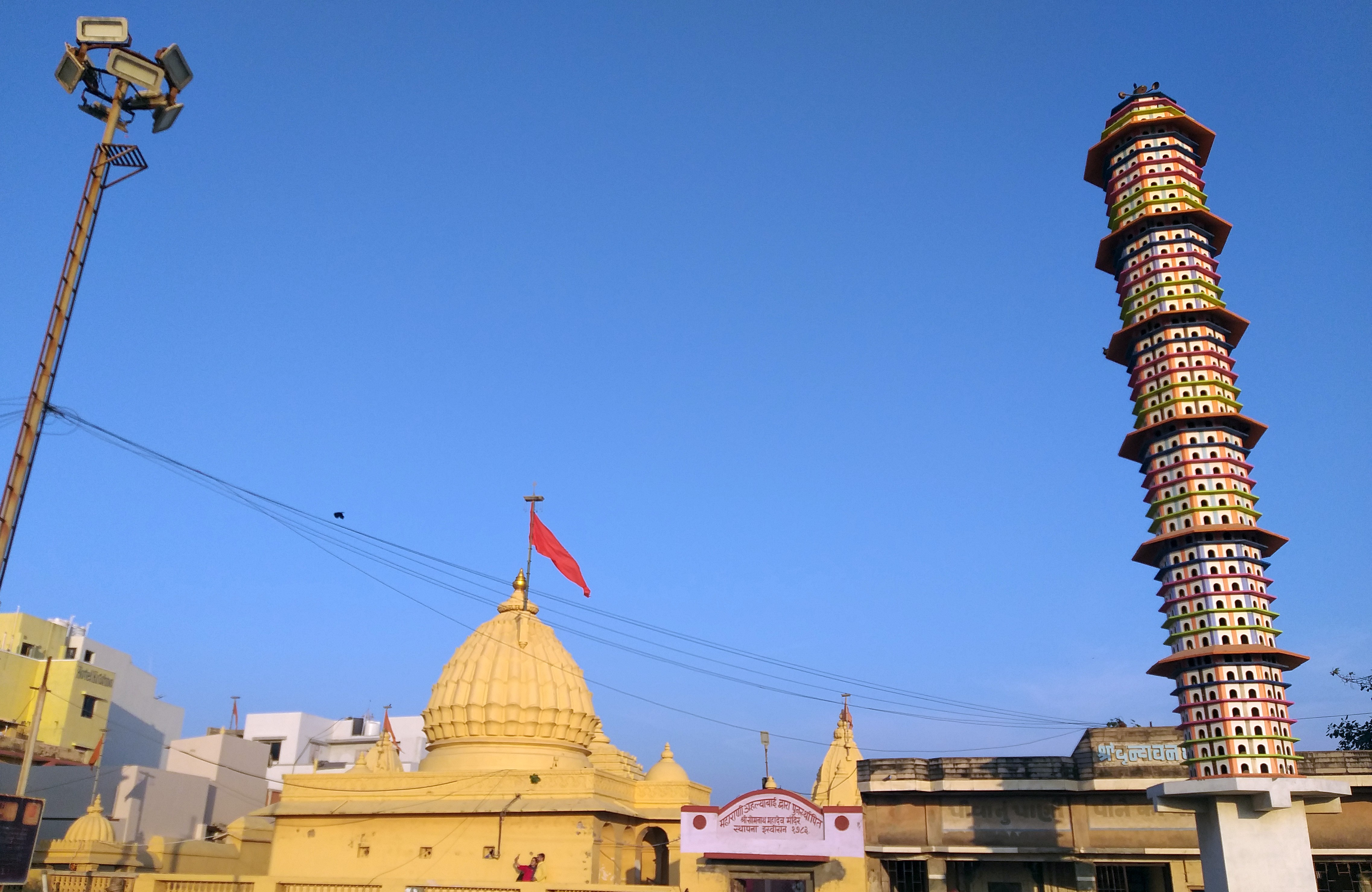

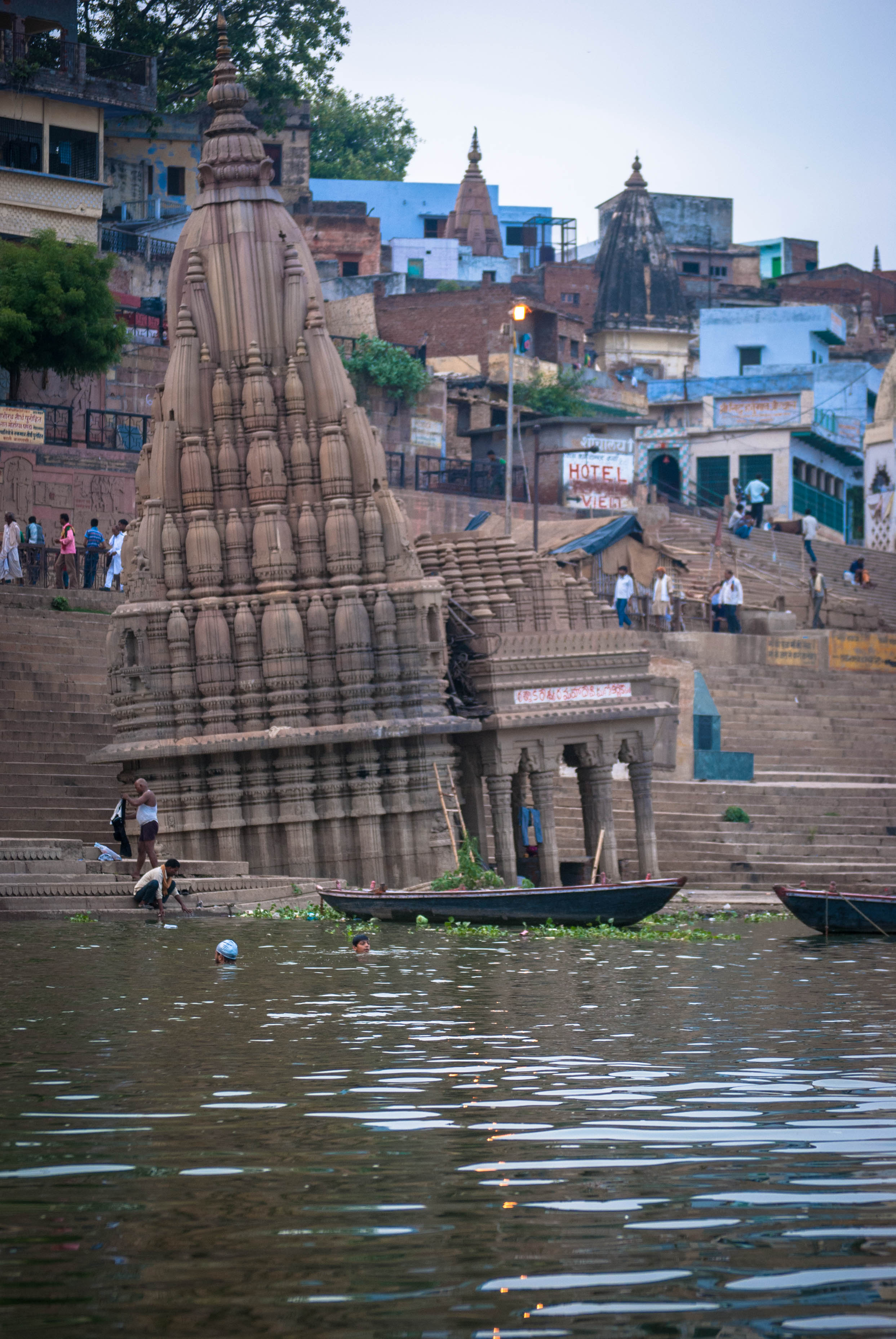

== Death ==
Ahilyabai died on 13 August 1795 at age 70. She was succeeded by her commander-in-chief and brother-in-law, Tukoji Rao Holkar, who abdicated the throne in 1797 in favour of his son Kashi Rao Holkar.

== Legacy ==
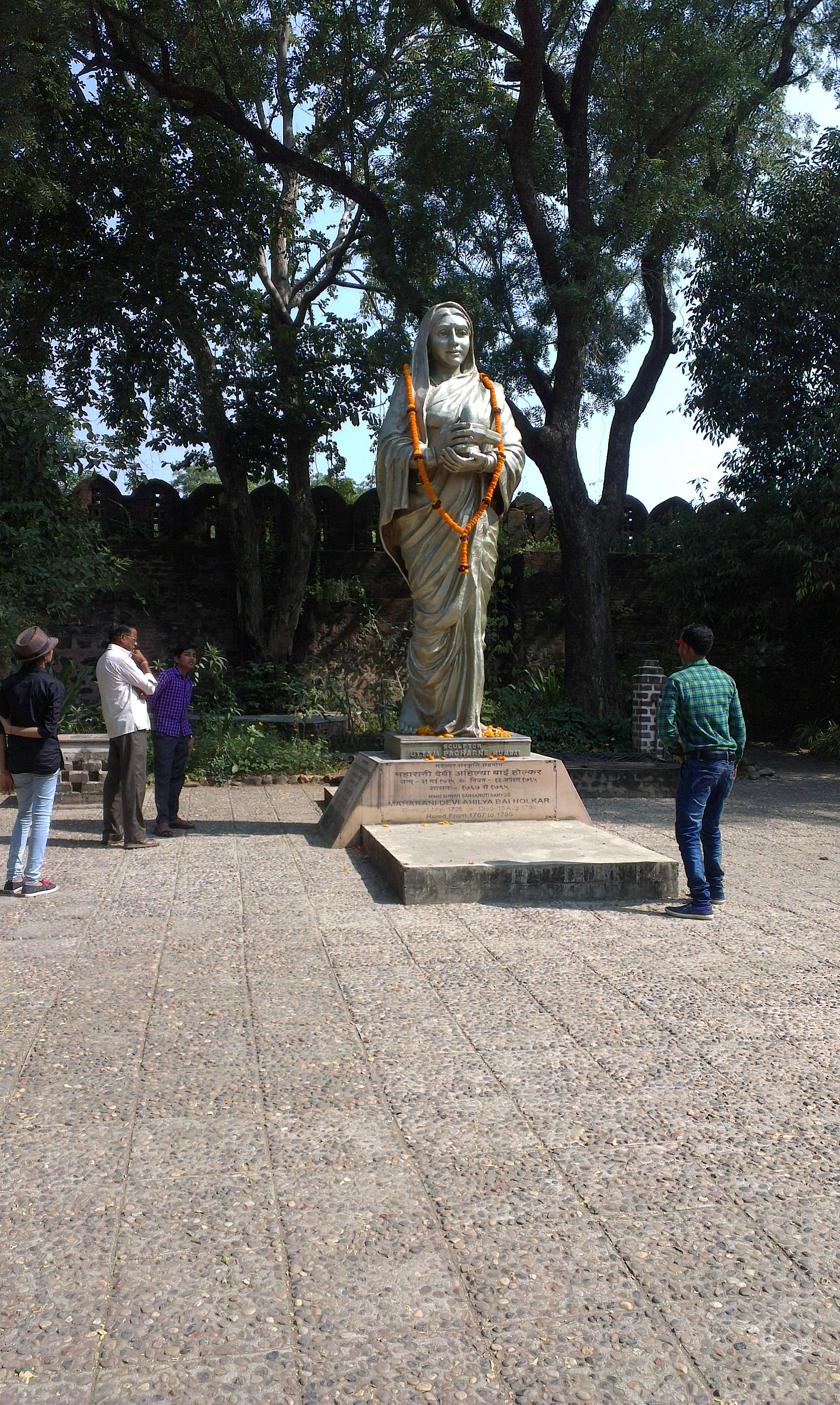
Statue of Ahilybai Holkar, Maheshwar, Madhya Pradesh

=== 300th Birth Anniversary Celebrations ===
On May 31, 2025, tributes were paid across India to Maharani Ahilyabai Holkar, who was revered as a queen of the Maratha Malwa kingdom and remembered for her legacy of good governance focused on public welfare, education, and socio-cultural development.

According to many scholars, her important legacy includes the cultural philanthropy, notably the building of Hindu temples, dharamshalas, wells, and ghats across India, including the Kashi Vishwanath Temple and temples in Dwarka, Somnath, and Rameswaram. She is also remembered for her commitment to socio-cultural and economic development, especially the encouragment of women education and their participation in the social and religious life of the local community. She supported and encouraged women weavers to make Maheshwari saris.

=== Quotes by famous people ===
"The reign of Ahilyabai, of Indore in central India, lasted for thirty years. This has become almost legendary as a period during which perfect order and good government prevailed and the people prospered. She was a very able ruler and organizer, highly respected during her lifetime, and considered as a saint by a grateful people after her death."

— Jawaharlal Nehru, The Discovery of India (1946)

"For thirty years her reign of peace,
The land in blessing did increase;
And she was blessed by every tongue,
By stern and gentle, old and young.
Yea, even the children at their mother's feet,
Are taught such homely rhyming to repeat.
In latter days from Brahma came,
To rule our land, a noble Dame,
Kind was her heart and bright her fame,
And Ahilya was her honored name."

— Joanna Baillie, English Poem (1849)

Collecting oral memories of hers in the 1820s, Sir John Malcolm, the British official most directly concerned with the 'settlement' of central India, seems to have become deeply enamored of her.

"Ahilyabai's extraordinary ability won her the regard of her subjects and of the other Maratha chiefs, including Nana Phadnavis. With the natives of Malwa ... her name is sainted and she has styled an avatar or Incarnation of the Divinity. In the soberest view that can be taken of her character, she certainly appears, within her limited sphere, to have been one of the purest and most exemplary rulers that ever existed."

— John Malcolm, A Memoir of Central India

"This great ruler in Indore encouraged all within her realm to do their best, Merchants produced their finest clothes, trade flourished, the farmers were at peace and oppression ceased, for each case that came to the queen's notice was dealt with severely. She loved to see her people prosper, and to watch the fine cities grow, and to watch that her subjects were not afraid to display their wealth, lest the ruler should snatch it from them. Far and wide the roads were planted with shady trees, and wells were made, and rest-houses for travelers. The poor, the homeless, the orphaned were all helped according to their needs. The Bhils who had long been the torment of all caravans were routed from their mountain fastnesses and persuaded to settle down as honest farmers. Hindu and Musalman alike revered the famous Queen and prayed for her long life. Her last great sorrow was when her daughter became a Sati upon the death of Yashwantrao Phanse. Ahalya Bai was seventy years old when her long and splendid life closed. Indore long mourned its noble Queen, happy had been her reign, and her memory is cherished with deep reverence unto this day."

— Annie Besant

"From the original papers and letters, it becomes clear that she was the first-class politician, and that was why she readily extended her support to Mahadji Shinde. I have no hesitation in saying that without the support of Ahilyabai, Mahadji would never have gained so much importance in the politics of northern India."

— Historian Judunath Sarkar

"Definitely no woman and no ruler are like Ahilyabai Holkar."

— Nizam of Hyderabad

"It reveals beyond doubt that all ideal virtues described by Plato and Bhattacharya were present in her personalities like Dilip, Janak, Shri Ram, Shri Krishna, and Yudhishthir. After thorough scrutiny of the long history of the world, we find only one personality of Lokmata Devi Ahilya that represents an absolutely ideal ruler."

— Arvind Javlekar

John Keay called her 'The Philosopher Queen', a reference perhaps to the 'Philosopher king' Bhoj.

"Ahilyabai Holkar, the 'philosopher-queen' of Malwa, had evidently been an acute observer of the wider political scene. In a letter to the Peshwa in 1772, she had warned against association with the British and likened their embrace to a bear-hug: "Other beasts, like tigers, can be killed by might or contrivance, but to kill a bear it is very difficult. It will die only if you kill it straight in the face, Or else, once caught in its powerful hold, the bear will kill its prey by tickling. Such is the way of the English. And in view of this, it is difficult to triumph over them."

— John Keay, India: A History (2000)

"The Great Maratha lady who affords the noblest example of wisdom, goodness, and virtue. Akbar is among male sovereigns, and Ahilyabai is among female sovereigns".

— An English writer quoted in the book Ahilya Bai Holkar by Khadpekar

A commemorative stamp was issued in her honour on 25 August 1996 by the Republic of India.

As a tribute to the great ruler, Indore international airport has been named Devi Ahilyabai Airport. Similarly, Indore university has been renamed as Devi Ahilya Vishwavidyalaya.

On 13 March 2024, the Maharashtra state government approved the renaming of Ahmadnagar to Ahilyanagar.

== In popular culture ==
- Former Lok Sabha Speaker Sumitra Mahajan has written a book "Matoshree" based on the life of Ahilyadevi Holkar
- A film titled Devi Ahilyabai was produced in 2002 featuring Mallika Prasad as Devi Ahilyabai, Shabana Azmi as Harkubai (Khanda Rani, Malhar Rao Holkar's wife) and also including Sadashiv Amrapurkar as Malhar Rao Holkar, Ahilyabai's father in law.
- In Thane City in Maharashtra, a children's park has been named as 'Ahilyadevi Holkar Udyan' after her. Also, a road has been named after her in the same city.
- The airport at Indore is named Devi Ahilyabai Holkar Airport in her honor.
- There are two universities named Devi Ahilya Vishwa Vidyalaya in Indore, Madhya Pradesh, and Punyashlok Ahilyadevi Holkar Solapur University in Solapur, Maharashtra.
- In 2006, a statue of Ahilyabai was unveiled on the premises of the Parliament Library Building by Vice-president Bhairon Singh Shekhawat.
- In the 1994 Hindi TV series The Great Maratha, Ahilyabai's character was portrayed by Mrinal Kulkarni.
- In 2016, a TV serial titled Awaaz: Punyashlok Ahilybai Holkar aired on Colors Marathi starring Urmila Kothare as Ahilybai.
- The State Highway 15 (West Bengal) has been renamed as Ahilyabai Road.
- In 2021, a Hindi TV series titled Punyashlok Ahilyabai aired on Sony TV, starring Aetashaa Sansgiri as Ahilyabai and Aditi Jaltare as a young Ahilyabai.
- Government Medical College in Baramati(Maharashtra) and Auraiya(Uttar Pradesh) has been named after her.
- Government Engineering College in Mainpuri is named as Lokmata Devi Ahilya bai Holkar Rajkiya Engineering College,Mainpuri after her.
- Ahilyabai Holkar Stadium, Ramghat Road, Aligarh (Uttar Pradesh)
