= Runji Gautampura =

- Town
- Location in Madhya Pradesh, India Runji Gautampura (India)
- Coordinates: 22°59′11″N 75°31′23″E
- Country: India
- State: Madhya Pradesh
- District: Indore

Languages
  - Official: Hindi
- Time zone: UTC+5:30 (IST)
- ISO 3166 code: IN-MP
- Vehicle registration: MP

Runji Gautampura is a town and a nagar panchayat in Indore district in the Indian state of Madhya Pradesh. Gautampura was built by the holkar state queen Rani Gautama Bai Holkar

== Demographics ==
As of 2001 India census, Runji Gautampura had a population of 13,221. Males constitute 51% of the population and females 49%. Runji Gautampura has an average literacy rate of 58%, lower than the national average of 59.5%. The male literacy is 69%, and female literacy is 46%. In Runji Gautampura, 16% of the population is under 6 years of age.
