= Gautama Bai Holkar =

Indian queen and Maratha ruler (1694–1761)

Gautamabai Holkar
- 1st Queen consort of the Holkar Dynasty
- Reign: 1734 – 29 September 1761
- Successor: Ahilyabai Holkar
- Born: 16 June 1694; Talode
- Died: 29 September 1761 (aged 67); Piplya Rao Indore
- Spouse: Malhar Rao Holkar
- Issue: Khanderao Holkar, Santubai Holkar, Udabai Holkar
Names
- Gautamabai Sahib Holkar
- House: Holkar
- Father: Bhojraj Baba Bargal
- Mother: Mohini Bai
- Religion: Hinduism

Gautamabai Holkar (née Bargal; 16 June 1694 – 29 September 1761) was the first queen of the Holkar dynasty in Malwa, India. She was the first wife of Malhar Rao Holkar, the founder of the Holkar Dynasty, and the mother-in-law of Devi Ahilyabai Holkar, who succeeded Gautamabai as the Queen of Malwa.

== Early life and marriage ==
Gautamabai was born on 16 June 1694 to Bhojraj Baba Bargal, a wealthy landlord from Talode, and his wife Mohini Bai. Her brother was Narayan Rao Bargal. Named after the sage Gautameshwar, Gautamabai spent her early years in Talodya.

Her future husband, Malhar Rao Holkar, was the son of her paternal aunt and spent his childhood at her family's residence. Gautamabai and Malhar Rao married in 1717.

== Role as a Queen ==
Gautamabai was known for her wisdom and influence in both private and public matters. She was a devoted disciple of Shore Bhramendra Swami, the guru of Bajirao I, and played a crucial role in guiding Malhar Rao Holkar in administrative and military affairs. During Malhar Rao's frequent absences due to military campaigns, Gautamabai managed state affairs and inspired her husband in his endeavors.

She was instrumental in the early administrative and cultural developments of Malwa. In 1725, she gave birth to Khanderao Holkar. She was known for her piety and charitable activities, which included renovating the Ghrishneshwar Temple in the year 1729 and initiating the construction of the Omkareshwar Temple, later completed by Devi Ahilyabai Holkar. She also began the construction of the Shree Keshavrao Temple.

In 1754, after the death of her son Khanderao Holkar in Khumbher, she played a key role in preventing her daughter-in-law, Ahilyabai Holkar, from committing sati.

== Khasgi Jagir ==
In 1734, Peshwa Bajirao I conferred the Khasgi estate to Gautamabai in perpetuity. This estate was unique among Maratha states as it was managed directly by the sovereign's consort and was separate from the state's revenue.

Under her administration, the estate included key regions such as Maheshwar, Choli, Indore, Harsola, Depalpur, Madhya Pradesh, Mahidpur, Barloi, Jagoti, Makdone, Chandwad, Ambad and others.

Gautamabai's agricultural practices were significant, with her lands producing various crops, including opium flowers. The Khasgi Jagir also contributed to religious and cultural practices, including the installation of the Devi of Mankeshwar temple and Gargya's Sawa in Wafgaon.

In 1759, her Khasgi Jagir was inherited by her daughter-in-law, Ahilyabai Holkar, with a staggering amount of 15 crores; Approximately 5750 Cr (as of 2025) using USD as proxy (US$640 Million)

== City planning ==
Gautampura, also known as Runji Gautampura, is located in the Indore district of Indore State, Central India, at 22° 59′ N latitude and 75° 35′ E longitude. The town lies 33 miles northwest of Indore city and 3 miles from the Chambal Station on the Rajputana-Malwa Railway.

The town was founded by Gautama Bai, the wife of Malhar Rao Holkar (1731–1766), and thus named after her.

Under the patronage of Gautama Bai and her daughter-in-law, Ahilyabai Holkar, Gautampura flourished. It became a center for the calico-printing industry, with its products widely marketed in Indore and nearby areas.

The town features notable architectural and civic elements, including:

- A prominent temple dedicated to Siva as Achaleshwar Mahadev Temple, built by Gautama Bai.
- Several smaller temples and a monastery belonging to the Ram Sanehi Ghat were built.
- Public facilities such as a school and a dispensary were assisted.

== Later life and death ==
The aftermath of the Third Battle of Panipat in 1761 profoundly impacted the Holkar family. Gautamabai's health, already compromised by asthma, deteriorated further due to the stress and turmoil from the war. She died on 29 September 1761.

== Legacy ==
Gautamabai Holkar's legacy includes her contributions to the Holkar Dynasty and her influence on Indian cultural and administrative traditions, notably through her daughter-in-law, Devi Ahilyabai Holkar, who succeeded her as the Queen of Malwa.

== See also ==
- Holkar
