= Malhar Rao Holkar =

Maharaja of Indore from 1732 to 1766

Malhar Rao
- Subedar of Malwa; Maharaja
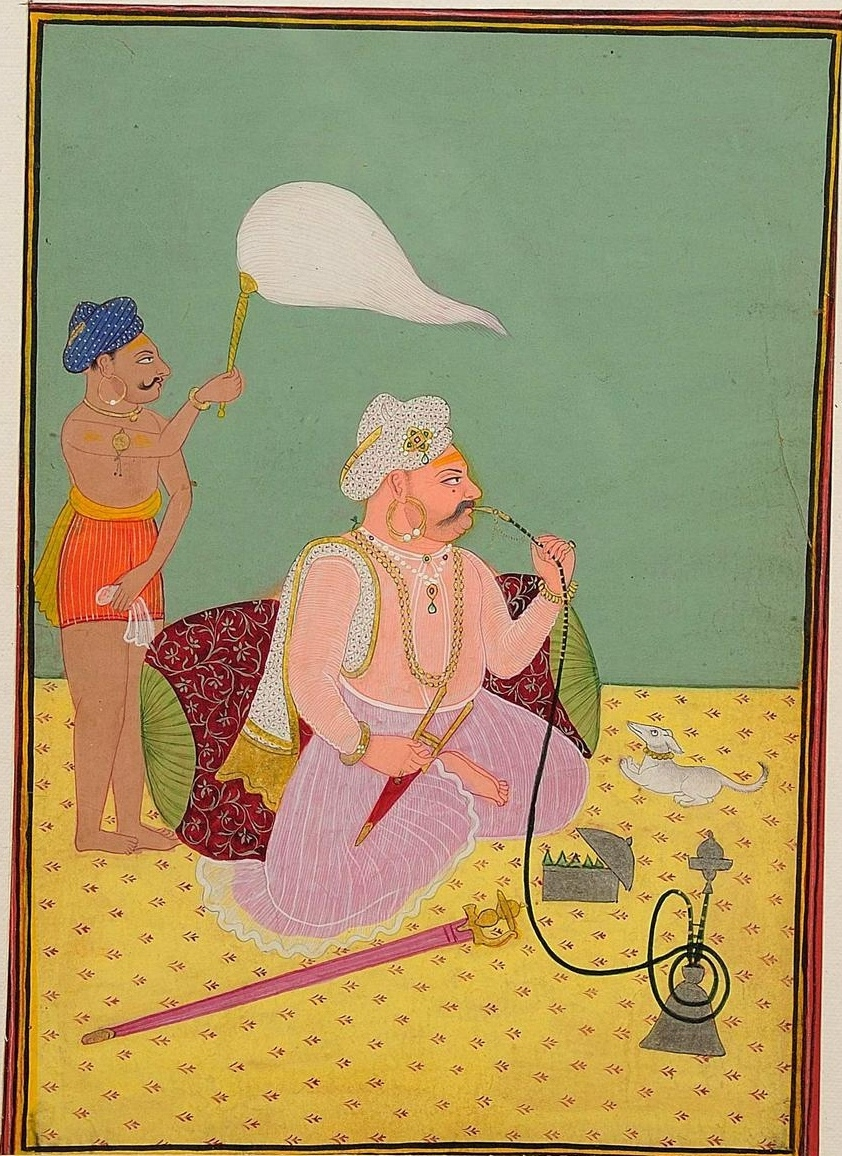
- Malhar Rao Holkar, Contemporary Painting c. 1770 from Bundi, Rajasthan

Maharaja of Indore
- Reign: 29 July 1732 – 20 May 1766
- Predecessor: Position established
- Successor: Male Rao Holkar
- Born: 16 March 1693; Murum, Phaltan, Satara district
- Died: 20 May 1766 (aged 73); Alampur, Madhya Pradesh, Maratha Empire
- Military career
- Spouse(s): Gautama Bai Holkar; Bana Bai Sahib Holkar; Dwarka Bai Sahib Holkar; Harkuwar Bai Sahib Holkar
- Children: Khanderao Holkar, Tukojirao Holkar
- Relatives: Khanderao Holkar (son); Ahilyabai Holkar (daughter-in-law); Male Rao Holkar (grandson); Tukoji Rao Holkar (grand-nephew and adopted son)
- Allegiance: Maratha Empire
- Rank: Maratha Empire 's general
- Conflicts: See list: Battle of Balapur; Battle of Vasai; Battle of Sikandarabad; Battle of Mandsaur; Siege of Thane; Battle of Farrukhabad (1751); Maratha-Nizam war (1751–1752); Battle of Mangrol; Battle of Delhi (1757); Siege of Barwara (1757); Capture of Peshawar (1758); Battle against the Kingdom of Amber (1759); Battle of Sikandarabad; Capture of Delhi (1760); Battle of Delhi (1764); Third Battle of Panipat; Battle of Bagru; Battle of Rakshasbhuvan; Battle of Dholpur (1766)

Malhar Rao Holkar (16 March 1693 – 20 May 1766) was a noble subedar of the Maratha Empire and the first Ruler of Indore from 1732 until his death in 1766. He was one of the early officers along with Ranoji Scindia (Shinde), appointed by Shrimant Peshwa Bajirao I to help spread Maratha rule to the northern states, and was given the estate of Indore to rule. He was the founder of the Holkar dynasty that ruled Malwa.

== Early life ==
Malhar Rao Holkar was born on 16 March 1693 to deshgavda Khandu Ji Holkar into a Marathi Dhangar - Gadaria caste family in Murum village near Phaltan in Satara district of Maharashtra. His father died in 1696, when he was only three years of age. Malhar Rao grew up in Taloda (Nandurbar District, Maharashtra) in the castle of his maternal uncle, Sardar Bhojrajrao Bargal. His maternal uncle held a cavalry under Maratha noble Sardar Kadam Bande. Bargal asked Malhar Rao to join his cavalry and soon after that he was placed in-charge of cavalry detachment.

He married Gautama Bai Holkar (née Bargal) (d. 29 September 1761), his maternal uncle's daughter, in 1717. He also married Bana Bai Holkar, Dwarka Bai Holkar and Harku Bai Holkar, a Khanda Rani between 1719 and 1726. This Khanda Rani status stems from the fact that she was a princess, he had sent his sword (Khaandaa in Marathi) to represent him at the wedding, to maintain appearances.

== Campaign in Malwa and Rajputana ==
In the early 1730s, amid factionalism in the court of Mughal Emperor Muhammad Shah, the Maratha Empire expanded its influence northward under Chhatrapati Shahu. Malhar Rao Holkar, alongside Ranoji Scindia and Anandrao Pawar, spearheaded the campaigns to establish supremacy in Malwa, a strategic province connecting the Deccan with North India. Maratha operations to dismantle Mughal authority in Malwa escalated systematically after 1728.

To counter the Maratha advance, the Mughals reappointed Jai Singh II of Jaipur as the Governor (Subahdar) of Malwa in 1732–1733. However, the Maratha forces led by Holkar decisively defeated Jai Singh's army near Mandsaur. This victory forced Jai Singh to sue for peace, agreeing to pay a tribute of six lakh rupees and ceding 28 parganas in lieu of Chauth, effectively bringing Malwa under Maratha administrative influence.

== Battle against the Kingdom of Amber ==
A battle was fought between the Maratha Holkar principality of Indore, led by the veteran Gangadhar Tatya, who was sent into battle by Malhar Rao Holkar, and the Rajput Kingdom of Amber under Sawai Madho Singh in present-day Kakor, Uniara, Tonk district of Rajasthan.

In 1759, Malharrao Holkar invaded Jaipur where a fierce battle took place. He despatched Gangadhar Tatya. Madho Singh dispatched an army of 4000 that was completely crushed. Tatya attacked Thakur Jodhsingh Singh, who was wounded and killed; the death of this commander was fatal as it saved Marathas who were on the verge of defeat. Gulab Singh tried to command the army, but was also killed. Lastly, Pratap Singh Naruka took the charges and fiercely went upon slaying the Marathas. Gangadhar Tatya was wounded, and had to escape from the battlefield whereas casualties of Rajput were huge, nearly 20 captains were slain. Rajputs were forced to seek peace.

Malharrao Holkar later laid siege to and captured Burwada fort, forcing Rajputs again to seek peace. Malharrao wasn't able to plunder for long as he had to leave Rajputana to help Dattaji. He arrived too late as Dattaji had already fallen in the Battle of Barari Ghat .

== War against the Rohillas and the Durrani Empire ==
One of the foremost commanders of the Maratha Empire (1760), he participated in the battles such as the Battle of Jalesar (1737), the Battle of Delhi (1737), and the defeat of the Nizam in the Battle of Bhopal (1737). He was also part of the campaign that wrested Vasai from the Portuguese in 1739. He received Rampura, Bhanpura and Tonk in 1757, for the assistance given to Madhosingh I of Jaipur in his contest with Ishwari Singh. Granted an Imperial Sardeshmukhi for Chandore, for his gallantry in the Rohilla campaign of 1748. From 1748 onwards, Malhar Rao Holkar's position in Malwa became firm and secure. Such was his terror that when Ishwari Singh learned that Malhar Rao is coming to arrest him, he killed himself. However, as an act of chivalry, Malhar Rao cremated his body as per the Hindu rituals.

He was called as the foster father of Najib-ud-Daulah. Malhar Rao Holkar, Jayappa Sindhia, Gangadhar Tatya, Tukojirao Holkar and Khanderao Holkar went to help Safdarjung against Shadulla Khan, Ahmed Khan Bangash, Mohamud Khan and Bahadur Khan Rohilla as per the directions of Peshwa Balaji Bajirao. In the Battle of Fatthegad and Farukhabad, they defeated the Rohillas and Bangash (March 1751-April 1752). When the Mughal Emperor learned that Ahmed Shah Abdali had attacked Punjab in December 1751, he asked Safdarjung to make peace with Rohillas and Bangash. On 12 April 1752, Safdarjung agreed to help Marathas but the Emperor didn't ratify the agreement and instead signed a treaty with Ahmed Shah Abdali on 23 April 1752. Meanwhile, the Peshwa asked Malhar Rao Holkar to return to Pune as Salabat Khan had attacked the city.

The Marathas besieged Kumher Fort from 20 January to 18 May 1754. The war continued for about four months. During the war Khanderao Holkar, son of Malhar Rao Holkar, was one day inspecting his army in an open palanquin, when he was fired upon from the fort. The cannonball hit and killed him on 24 March 1754. Malhar Rao was infuriated by the death of his only son and wanted to take revenge. He vowed that he would cut off the head of Maharaja Suraj Mal and throw the soil of fort into Yamuna after destroying it. The Marathas increased pressure on the fort and Suraj Mal defended passively, but Suraj Mal was isolated as no other ruler was ready to help him. At this moment, Maharaja Suraj Mal was counseled by Maharani Kishori, who assured him not to worry and started diplomatic efforts. She contacted Diwan Roop Ram Katara. She knew that there were differences between Malhar Rao Holkar and Jayappa Sindhia and that Jayappa was very firm in his determinations. She advised Maharaja Suraj Mal to take advantage of mutual differences within Marathas. Diwan Roop Ram Katara was a friend of Jayappa Sindhia. She requested Diwan Roop Ram Katara to take a letter from Maharaja Suraj Mal proposing a treaty. Jayappa Sindhia assured Suraj Mal of assistance and contacted Raghunathrao. Raghunathrao in turn advised Holkar to sign a treaty with Suraj Mal. Malhar Rao Holkar assessed the situation and consented for the treaty due to possibility of isolation. This led to a treaty between both rulers on 18 May 1754. This treaty proved very beneficial for Maharaja Suraj Mal.

Ghazi ud-Din Khan Feroze Jung III, aided by the Marathas led by Malhar Rao Holkar, defeated Safdarjung. At this the Mughal Emperor Ahmad Shah Bahadur collected a large army and camped at Sikandrabad. On the other hand, the Peshwa's younger brother Raghunath Rao, Malhar Rao Holkar and 2,000 Maratha's and their ally Feroze Jung III routed Imperial Mughal Army of the Mughal Emperor Ahmad Shah Bahadur at the First Battle of Sikandarabad (1754). The Emperor left his mother, wives and a retinue of 8,000 women behind and fled to Delhi.

Malhar Rao Holkar, Raghunathrao, Shamsher Bahadur, Gangadhar Tatya, Sakharambapu, Naroshankar and Maujiram Bania attacked Delhi on 11 August 1757 and defeated Najib-ul-Daula and Ahmed Khan became the Mir Bakshi in his place. In March 1758, they conquered Sarhind. On 20 April 1758, Malhar Rao Holkar and Raghunathrao attacked and conquered Lahore. Tukojirao Holkar conquered Attock while Sabaji Scindia, Vitthal Shivdev Vinchurkar met them at Peshawar. Raghunathrao and Malharrao Holkar returned from Punjab. He was the most feared Maratha Sardar at that time.

He was raised to the rank of Subedar in 1757. Malhar Rao Holkar was defeated decisively by the cavalry of the Durrani Empire led by Jahan Khan at the Second Battle of Sikandarabad (1760).

Malhar Rao didn't help Dattaji Rao Scindia against Ahmed Shah Abdali and remained in Rajputana. Many historians criticize him for not coming to the rescue of the Scindias in the time of a national danger, while some historians speak in favour of his move by claiming that it would have weakened his position in Rajputana. He tried guerrilla warfare after the defeat and death of Dattaji Shinde and achieved some success with his dream of capturing Delhi under his rule coming true. However, due to open plains between the forests in North India, lack of geographical knowledge and lack of support from the locals, he was decisively defeated by the Afghan general Jahan Khan at Rewadi and at the Second Battle of Sikandrabad. With it, his dream of conquering Delhi ended.

He participated in the Third Battle of Panipat. He, along with Raja Surajmal is said to have advised Sadashivrao Bhau, Peshwa's cousin and the de facto commander of the Maratha army to leave all their heavy luggage, civilians and heavy static French-made cannons in any of the Maratha forts behind the Chambal river and perform the traditional Maratha guerrilla warfare against the Afghans until they retreat from India. His advice was refused by Sadashivrao partly because he believed in the European modernized form of warfare and partly because Malharrao's guerilla warfare failed against the Afghans. Some sources also state that Sadashivrao's advisors asked him to not pay any heed to Malhar Rao's advice's as he didn't want Bhau to cross Central India and see how he and other Sardars mishandled the situation.

He organized many raids against the Afghans and showed immense bravery, killing thousands of Durrani and Rohilla soldiers. He retreated from the battlefield of Panipat after seeing the Marathas losing and saved with him thousands of civilians and families of honorable Sardars. Many called him a coward for it while many argue that he was asked to save Parvatibai and many others by Sadashivrao himself if they are losing. Also if he would have remained in the battlefield, his light cavalry wouldn't have been able to do much against the Afghan Zamburaks and Jezails in a pitched battle. The most probable outcome would have been a delayed Maratha defeat.

He decisively defeated the Rajput forces at the Battle of Mangrol and played a pivotal role in the resurrection of the Maratha power in Central India following the Third Battle of Panipat. He also supported his daughter-in-law, Ahilyabai Holkar in laying foundation of her future glorious reign. He also helped Mahadji Scindia alias Shinde in recovering form the debacle at Panipat and helped him in restoring the lost power of the Scindias.

== Death and legacy ==
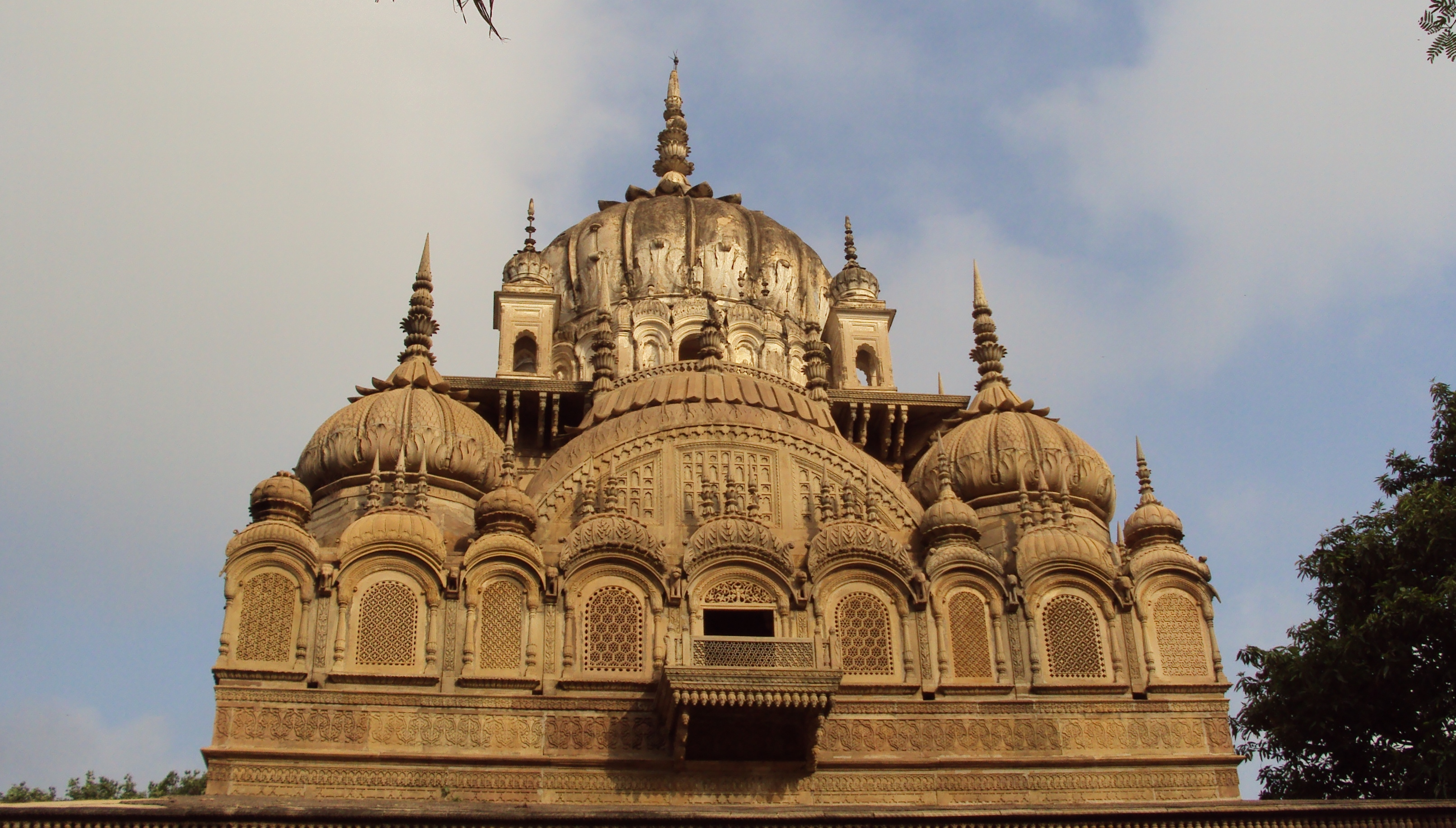
Chhatri of Malhar Rao Holkar, built by his daughter-in-law Ahilya Bai Holkar, at Alampur, Madhya Pradesh.

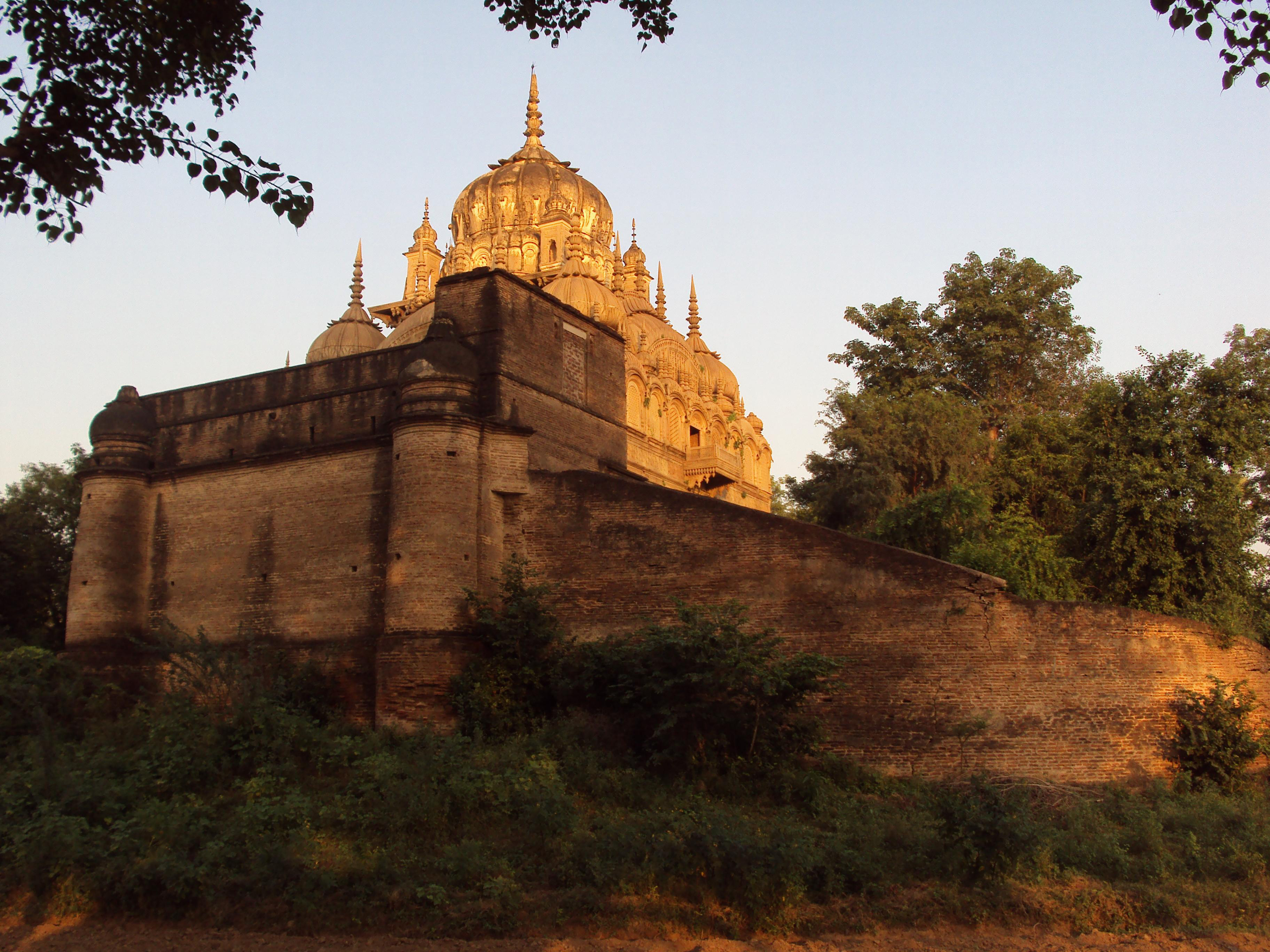
Back view of Malhar Rao Holkar's Chhatrisamadhi at Alampur, Madhya Pradesh.

He died at Alampur on 20 May 1766. His only son Khanderao Holkar had already died in 1754 during the siege of Kumher Fort against the Jat Maharaja Suraj Mal of Bharatpur State. After his son Khanderao's death in 1754, Malhar Rao prevented Khanderao Holkar's wife Ahilya Bai Holkar from committing sati. Malhar Rao's grandson and Khanderao's young son Male Rao Holkar became the ruler of Indore in 1766, under the regentship of Ahilyabai, but he too died within few months in 1767. Ahilyabai became the ruler of Indore after the death of her only son with Khanderao. He is considered one of the architects of Maratha control over India.

His daughter-in-law Ahilya Bai Holkar built his samadhi Chhatri, at the spot of his cremation, at Alampur of Lahar in Bhind district of Madhya Pradesh state.

== In popular culture ==
- In the 1994 Hindi TV series The Great Maratha, Holkar's character was portrayed by Parikshit Sahni.
- In the 2015 Bollywood movie Bajirao Mastani, Malhar Rao Holkar was portrayed by Ganesh Yadav.
- In the 2019 Bollywood war drama Panipat, Ravindra Mahajani portrays the role of Malhar Rao Holkar.
- In the Hindi-language TV series Peshwa Bajirao, Rushiraj Pawar portrays a young Holkar.
- In the Hindi-language TV series Punyashlok Ahilya Bai, Rajesh Shringarpure plays the role of Malhar Rao Holkar.
