= Kumher =

Kumher Kumbher
- Town
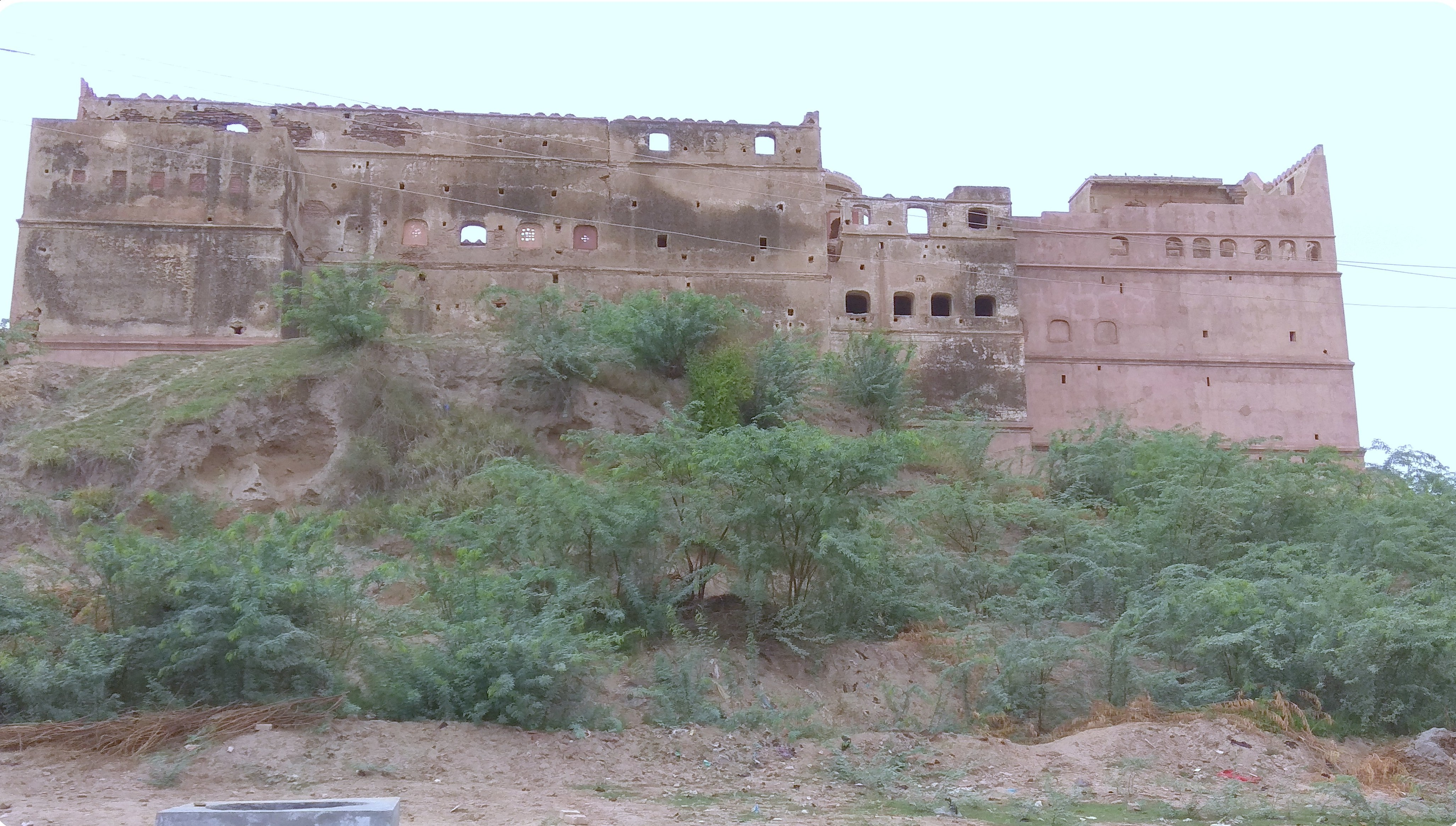
- Kumher Fort in 2017

- Location in Rajasthan, India Kumher (India)
- Coordinates: 27.32°N 77.37°E
- Country: India
- State: Rajasthan
- District: Deeg
- Elevation: 176 m (577 ft)

Population (2001)
  - Total: 20,294

Languages
  - Official: Hindi
- Time zone: UTC+5:30 (IST)

Kumher (formerly Kumbher) is a historical town, the initial name of this town was Kuber. It is located in Deeg District of Rajasthan, India.

== Demographics ==
At the time of the 2001 India census, Kumher had a population of 20,294. Males constitute 54% of the population and females 46%. Kumher has an average literacy rate of 54%, lower than the national average of 59.5%. Male literacy is 65%, and female literacy is 40%. In Kumher, 19% of the population is under 6 years of age. Famous Kishori Mahals (Palaces), Jal Mahal's are in Kumher. Kumher is also part of Braj Bhumi includes Govardhan Parikrima and Punchri Ka Lotha. Famous Temples in Kumer are Satya Narain Mandir, Hanuman Mandir, Jaharbir Baba Mandir, Guru Gorakh Nath Mandir, Shaktidhaam Mandir, Man Santoshi Mandir, Man Jwala Devi Mandir, Shri Ganeshji Mandir, Luxminarain Mandir, Tapsi wale Hanuman Mandir.

== Geography ==
Kumher is located at 27.32°N 77.37°E. It has an average elevation of 176 metres (577 feet). Kumher is also the birthplace of the illustrious Arya Samaji Vedic and Ayurvedic scholar, Pt. Satyendranath Vaidya (1902–1982).

== History ==
Kumher was founded by a Jat chieftain Kumbh in 1704. In 1754, when Maharaja Surajmal of Bharatpur was the king, the fort at Kumher was sieged by the Marathas as Peshwa Balaji Baji Rao's younger brother Raghoba (supported by chieftains Scindias and Holkars) wanted Surajmal to be subservant to them. However, the siege did not succeed. In 1754, on behest of Mughal Emperor Alamgir II, Khanderao laid the seize of Kumher fort of Jat Maharaja Suraj Mal of Bharatpur State who had sided with Alamgir's adversary Siraj ud-Daulah. Khanderao Holkar, son of Malhar Rao Holkar, was inspecting his troops on an open palanquin in the battle of Kumher when was hit and killed by a cannonball from the Jat army. Marathas (particularly Scindias and Holkars) signed a treaty with Surajmal and withdrew their army. To honor Khanderao, Suraj Mal built a Chhatri on the cremation spot of Khanderao at Kumher.
