= Male Rao Holkar =

Maharaja of Indore from 1766 to 1767

- Maharaja of Indore
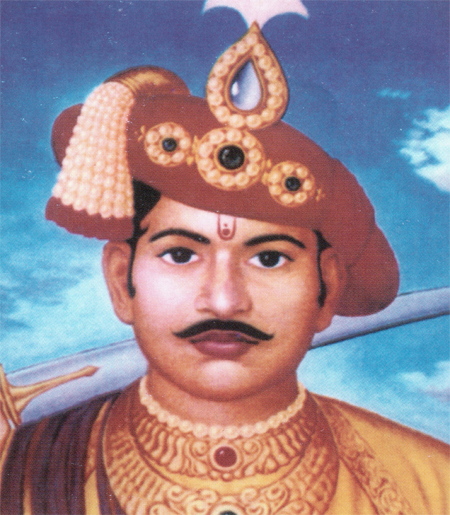

2nd Holkar Ruler of Indore
- Reign: 20 May 1766 – 5 April 1767
- Predecessor: Malhar Rao Holkar
- Successor: Ahilya Bai Holkar
- Regent: Ahilya Bai Holkar
- Born: 1745; Murum, Phaltan
- Died: 5 April 1767 (aged 21–22)
- Spouse: Mainabai (m. 1756); Pirtabai (m. 1765)
- Dynasty: Holkar
- Father: Khande Rao Holkar
- Mother: Ahilya Bai Holkar
- Religion: Hinduism

Male Rao Holkar was the Maharaja of Indore from 1766 until his death in 1767.

== Life ==
Since the age of 8–9 years, he used to accompany his father Khanderao Holkar and grandfather Malhar Rao Holkar to various military campaigns.

Malhar Rao gifted Malerao the Jagir of Sultanpur as a reward in 1761-62.

In his reign he was sent for a settlement with Jawahar Singh Jat by the Peshwa and successfully completed it.

He received a rich tika in 1765.

== Marriage ==
He was married to Mainabai Holkar (née Bahad) in 1756 at the age of 11. And later he was married to Pirtabai Holkar (née Wagh) in 1765. She was the daughter of Sardar Santaji Wagh, a general in Maratha Army.

== Death ==
Male Rao was suffering from a disease leading to his death.
