= Muthesius =

Muthesius is the surname of following people

- Anna Muthesius (1870–1961), German singer, German couturier and interior designer
- Eckart Muthesius (1904–1989), German architect and interior designer
- Hans Muthesius (1885–1977), German social worker, lawyer and social reformer
- Hermann Muthesius (1861–1927), German architect, co-founder of Deutscher Werkbund
- Volkmar Muthesius (1900–1979), German business journalist
- Winfried Muthesius (born 1957), German painter, photographer and installation artist

== Other uses ==
- Muthesius University of Fine Arts and Design in Kiel, Germany
- The Muthesius building at the Nauen Transmitter Station
