= Devyani Krishna =

Indian artist (1910–2000)

- Born: 1918
- Died: 2000 (aged 81–82)
- Education: Sir Jamsetjee Jeejebhoy School of Art, Mumbai
- Spouse: Kanwal Krishna (m. 1942)

Devyani (or Devayani) Krishna (1918–2000) was an Indian painter, print-maker and teacher. She was also involved in research work about Indian toys, folk motifs and batik work. She was regarded as 'India's foremost woman artist' of the day by the art critic Richard Bartholomew for her diverse body of works that she showcased in India and Europe.

Along with her husband Kanwal Krishna, she traveled to the Himalayas and documented the arts and culture of the region through their artworks. Her paintings were deeply influenced by her experiences during this tour.

== Early life and education ==
Devyani was born in Indore, Madhya Pradesh. In the 1930s, the city developed as a center for modernist experiments in the International Style under the patronage of Yashwant Rao Holkar II, the Maharaja of Indore. He commissioned German architect Eckart Muthesius to design and develop the Manik Bagh palace, and collected works made by the sculptor Constantin Brâncuși and architect Le Corbusier.

These developments in the city had an influence on Devyani from an early age. Her first art lessons came under the guidance of the master artist and teacher D. D. Deolalikar. In 1936, she moved to Bombay and joined the Sir J. J. School of Art to pursue her interest in painting. After graduating in 1940, she completed a specialization in mural painting.

== Career ==
Devyani married fellow artist Kanwal Krishna in 1942. They retreated to the Himalayas and travelled through Sikkim, the Tibetan border and the North-West Frontier Province from 1949 to 1952. From their travels, they made paintings of Tibetan masks, ritual dances and several aspects of Buddhist art. These were tumultuous times for people in the region. The couple witnessed the loss of autonomy of the Tibetan Buddhists to China. In 1951, China got complete control over Tibet, which sent Buddhists into exile.

After returning from the trip, Krishna joined as an art teacher at Modern School, New Delhi. She taught at the institute from 1954 to 1977, when she retired as the Head of the Art Department.

=== Style ===
Devyani's works show her strong sense of design which are complemented with a suitable composition and color harmony. Irrespective of the medium, her artworks included sacred symbols, and their concepts were based on the universal themes of family, war and religion.

Devyani's fascination with Tibetan and Buddhist culture was subsequently incorporated into her paintings. When she was asked about the dark aesthetic of her painting titled Veiled Mask, she replied, "No, it is not sad. This is a veiled mask. It is very hard to get to know people. This is just a human being behind two masks." Through such imagery, she responded to the tragedy that was unraveling in front of her during her travels in the Himalayas.

=== Reception ===
In 1972, Richard Bartholomew, the art critic at The Times of India, wrote about the rise of printmaking in India from the 1960s. He described Devyani as "perhaps the maturest printmaker in India". He added, "She brings both a philosophy and sensitivity to printmaking that are exceptionally rare. Her prints carry the impress of a mystique, besides being technically interesting."

== Works ==
=== Public collections ===
The artworks of Devyani are housed in the National Gallery of Modern Art, New Delhi, Delhi Art Gallery, and the Waswo X. Waswo Collection.

=== Exhibitions ===
- 1941 - First solo show at Calcutta
- 1996 - Modern Indian Paintings - One Hundred Years, Part I, Kumar Gallery, New Delhi, India
- 2005 - Golden Jubilee: Spirit Set Free, Kumar Gallery, New Delhi, India
- 2015 - Abby Grey and Indian Modernism: Selections from the NYU Art Collection, Grey Art Gallery, NYU, New York
- 2020 - The Fifties Show, Delhi Art Gallery, New Delhi, India
- 2021 - A Place in the Sun: Women Artists from 20th Century India, Delhi Art Gallery, New Delhi, India
