= Sanyogitabai Holkar of Indore =

Maharani consort of Indore

Sanyogita Bai Holkar
- Maharani
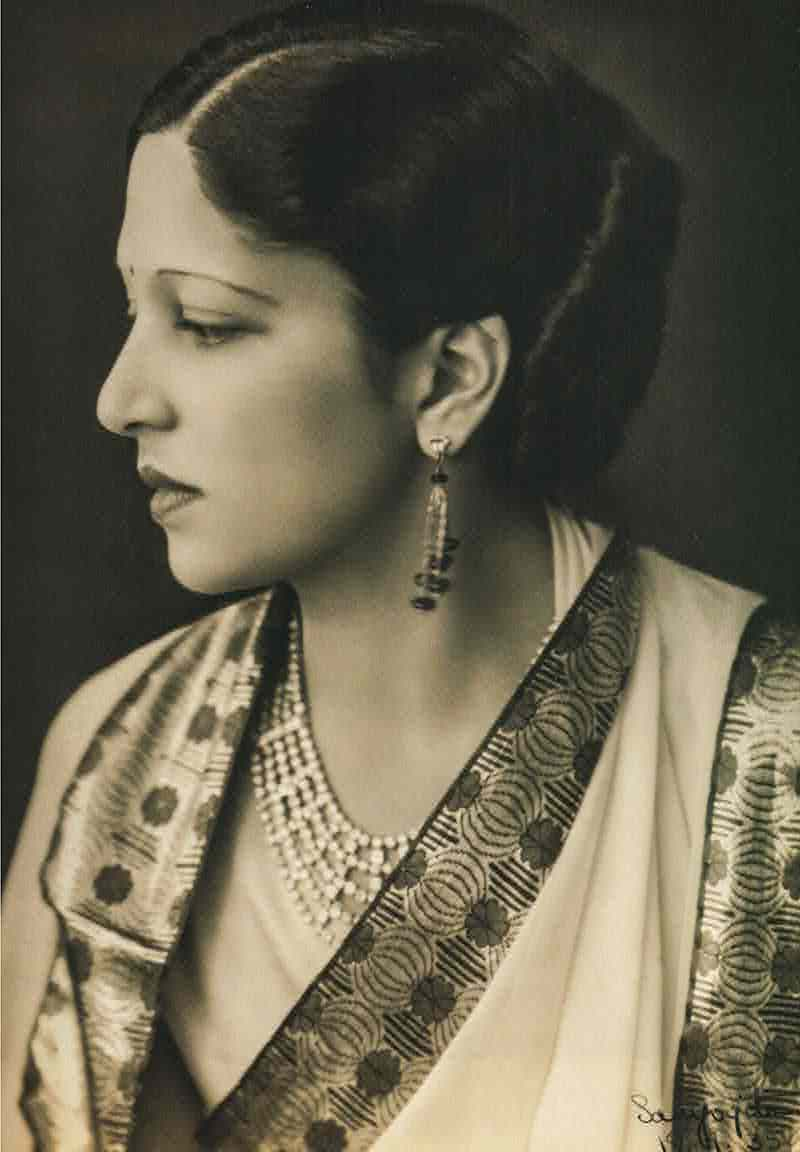
- Portrait, 1935

Maharani of Indore
- Tenure: 26 February 1926 – 13 July 1937
- Born: Chandraprabha Raje; 10 December 1915; Kolhapur
- Died: 13 July 1937 (aged 21); Samedan, Switzerland
- Spouse: Yashwant Rao Holkar II (m. 1924)
- Issue: Usha Raje
- Father: Dattajirao Narayanrao
- Education: St Elphin's School; Moira House School

Sanyogita (born Chandraprabha Raje, later Sanyogita Bai Holkar; 10 December 1915 – 13 July 1937) was an Indian socialite and the first wife of Yashwant Rao Holkar II. She served as Maharani of Indore from her husband’s accession on 26 February 1926 until her death in 1937.

== Early life and education ==
Sanyogita was born as Chandraprabha Raje on 10 December 1915 in Kolhapur to Dattajirao Narayanrao, the Chief of the junior branch of Kagal, and his third wife. She was educated privately up to the age of ten. Following which, she attended St Elphin's School in Derbyshire for a while, then Moira House School in East Sussex for two and a half years.

== Marriage ==
She married Yashwant Rao Holkar II on 9 February 1924. Her husband succeeded her father-in-law Tukoji Rao Holkar III as the Maharaja of Indore after he abdicated in his favour on 26 February 1926. Her only child with her husband Usha Raje was born on 20 October 1933 in Paris.

Along with her husband, she was extensively photographed by Man Ray. She contributed to efforts in the Eckart Muthesius designed palace, Manik Bagh.

== Death ==
In 1937, she visited Engadin in Switzerland. While in Switzerland, she fell seriously ill and had to undergo surgery for ruptured appendicitis by Dr. Ruppauer at Kreis Hospital in Samedan. She died during this surgery on 13 July 1937.

== Legacy ==
Sanyogitaganj, formerly the residency bazaar of Chawanni, in Indore is named for her. In 1980, many items from Manik Bagh were sold at auction in Monaco. In 2019, many were placed on display at an exhibition at the Museum of Decorative Arts in Paris.

== Gallery ==
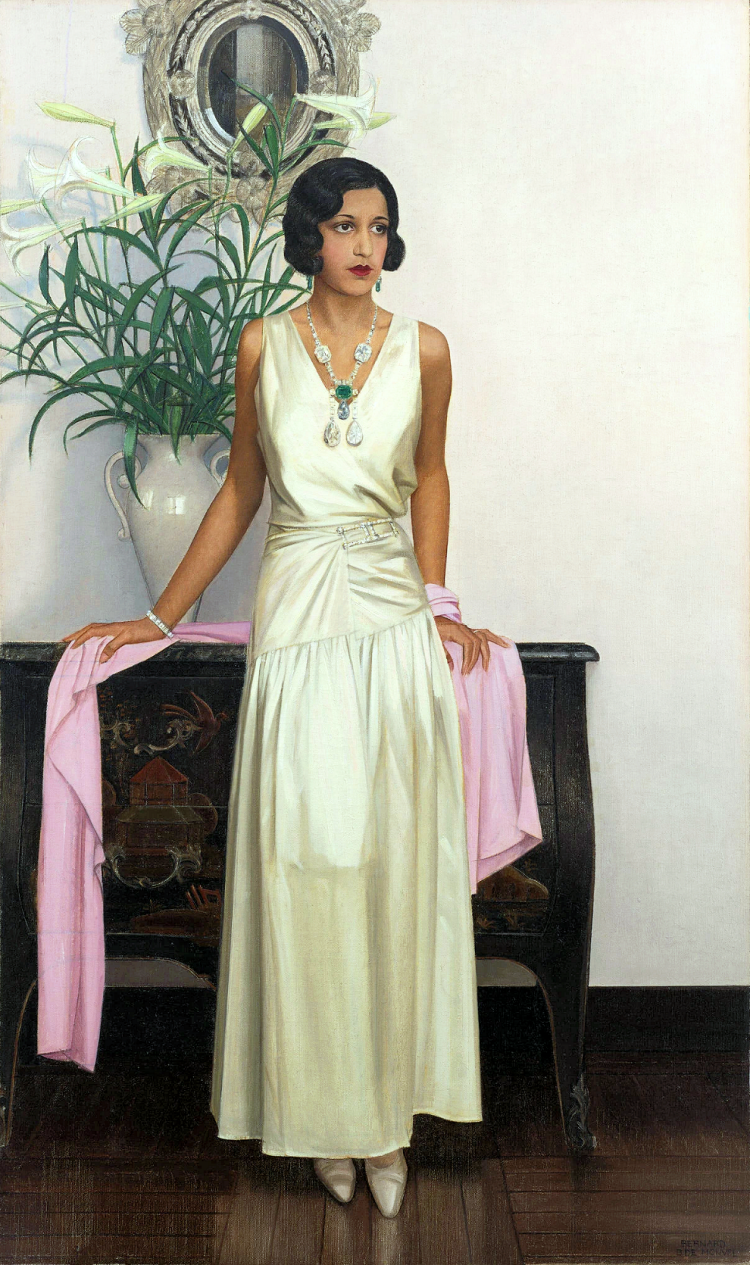

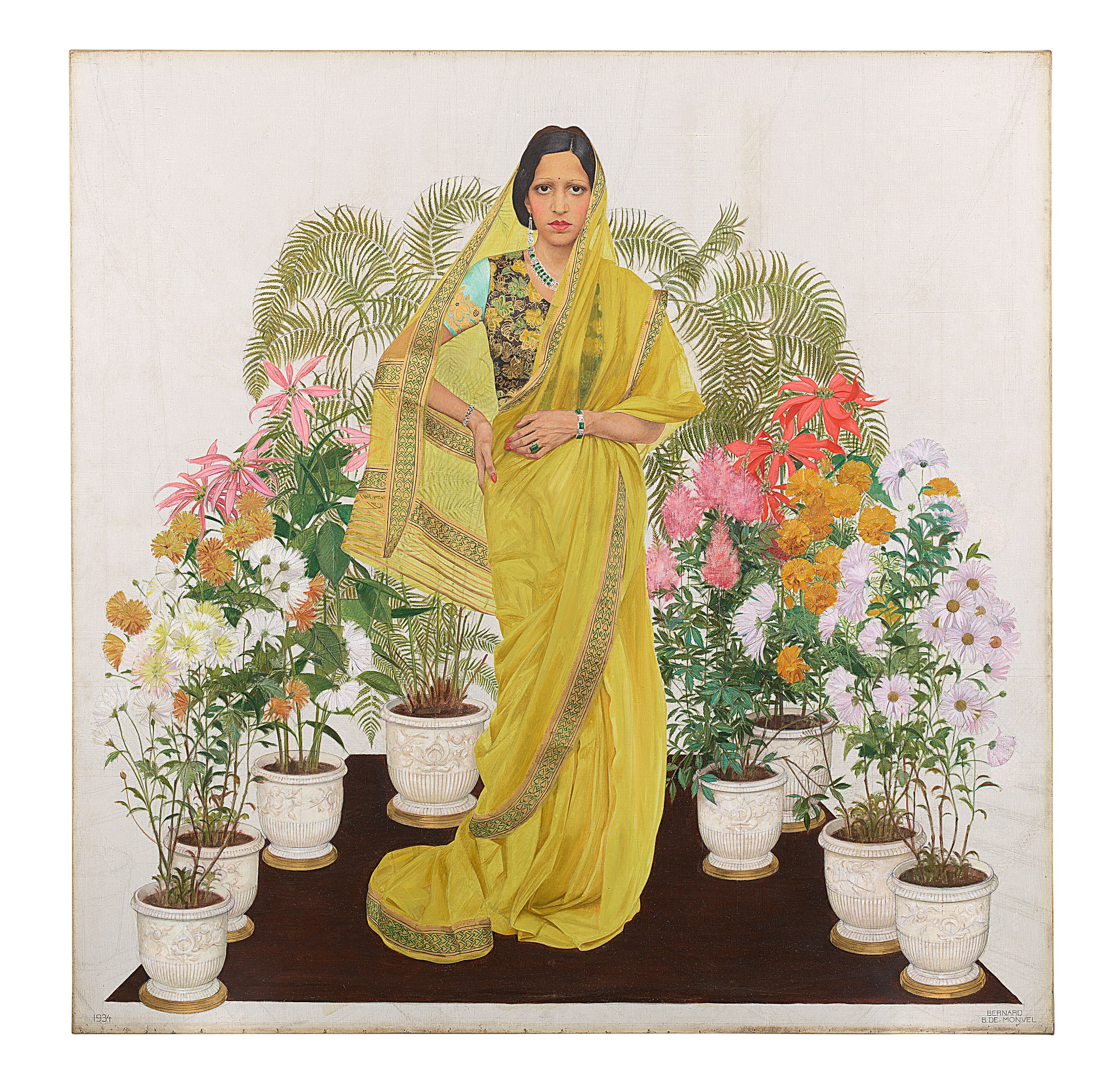

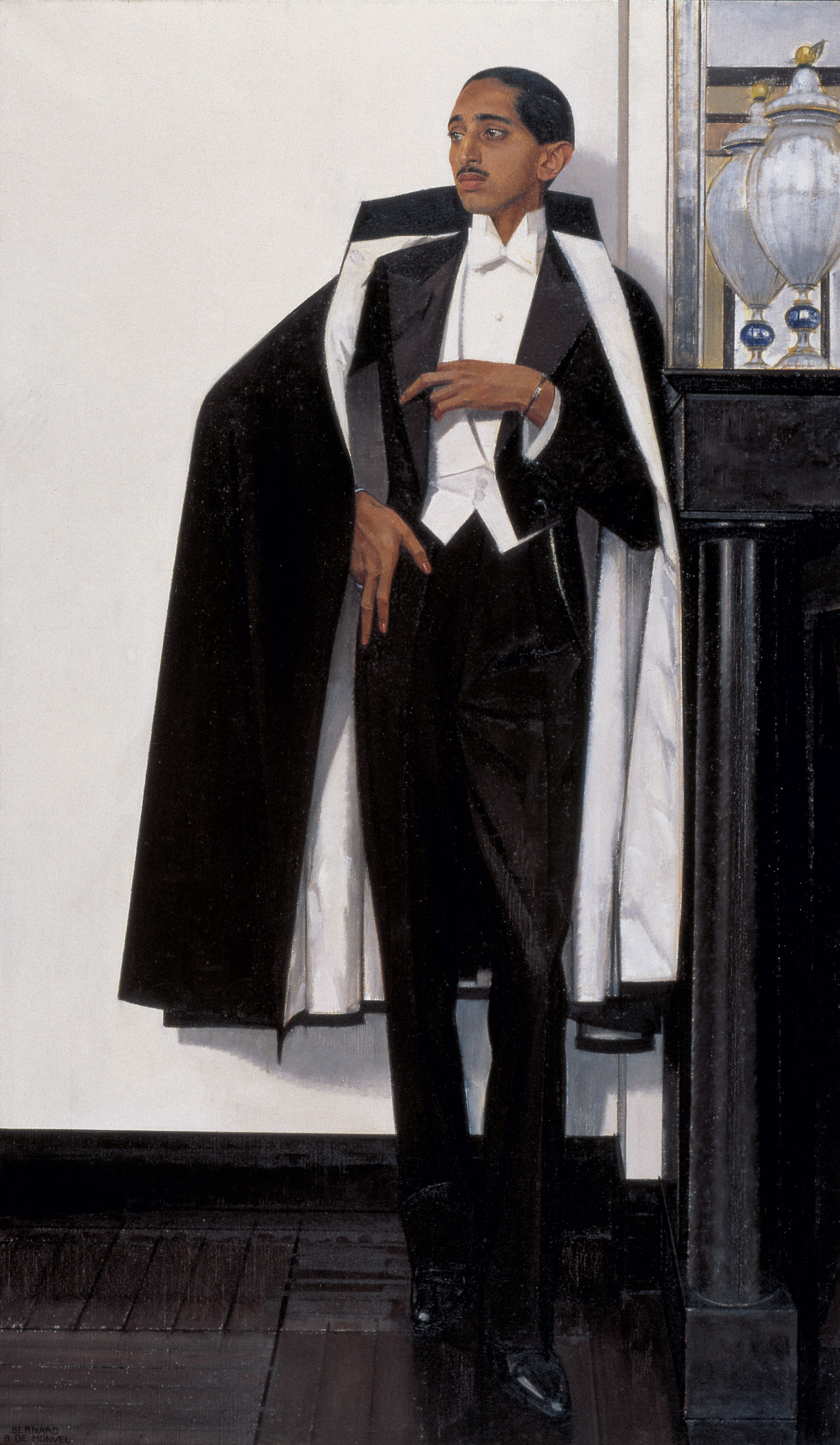
