= The English House =

Architectural book about England

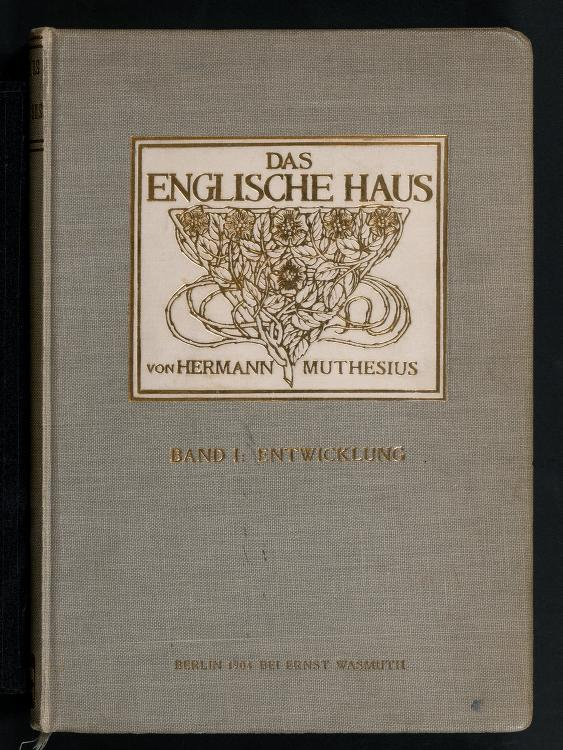
- Cover of the original 1904 German edition
- Author: Hermann Muthesius
- Language: German
- Publication date: 1904

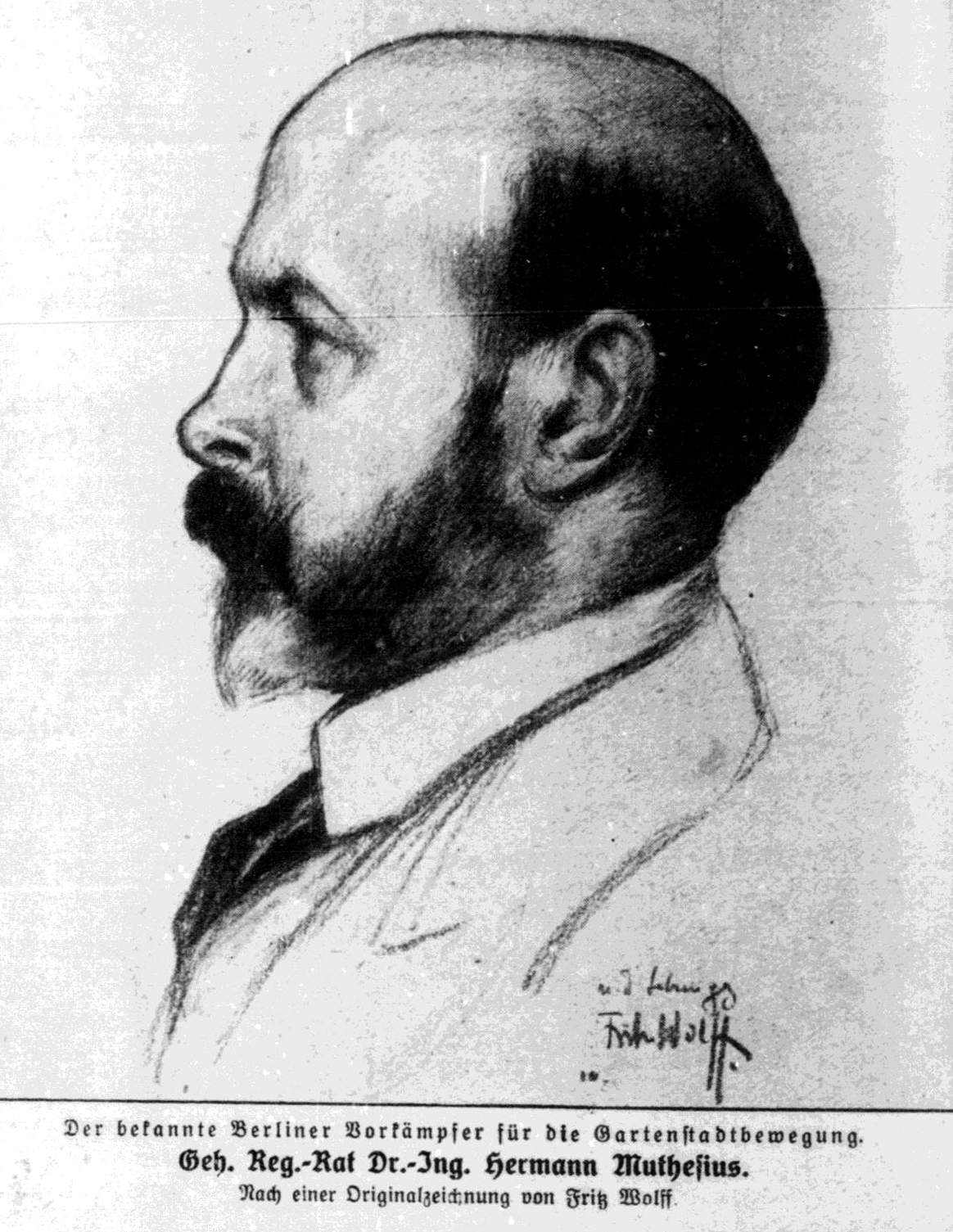
Hermann Muthesius as drawn by Fritz Wolff in 1911.

The English House is a book of design and architectural history written by German architect Hermann Muthesius and first published in German as Das englische Haus in 1904. Its three volumes provide a record of the revival of English domestic architecture during the later part of the nineteenth century. The main themes he discusses are history, form and decor.

A single-volume edited English language translation was published in 1979. The first full English translation was not for over a century, in 2007.

== Part I: Development ==
In Part I, Muthesius discusses the individuals involved in the parallel development of architecture and the Arts and Crafts Movement.

=== Earlier architects ===
Muthesius argues that the Pre-Raphaelites' study of nature instigated the fall of the then dominant academic art. Critic John Ruskin introduced the synthesis of artistic creation, nature and construction, which became a guiding principle of the Arts and Crafts Movement.

William Morris translated Ruskin’s ideas into practical craftsmanship. Morris established communal craft workshops and the formation of the Century Guild increased awareness of this movement. Growing support enabled the establishment of the Art Worker’s Guild in 1884 which was the first visible sign of the 'new art'. The movement grew stronger as the number of artistic craftsmen who were graduates of the South Kensington Schools increased.

Domestic architecture of the late nineteenth century was a mix of classicism, renaissance and gothic styles and therefore needed redefinition. This meant abandoning ideas of fine architecture and designing with the focus on practical considerations.

Muthesius describes Norman Shaw as an architect whose style was constantly evolving and thus occasionally resulted in several styles influencing one design. He offers Leyes Woods as an example of Shaw’s gothic and classical influence and Lowther Lodge as an example of baroque influence in his domestic designs. Through Bradford Park (sic) Shaw resolved the issues facing the small house in the late nineteenth century by combining the principles of aestheticism and practicality.

=== Development of the modern English house under younger architects ===
The independent development of art and architecture in the nineteenth century relied on the architect's view of them as separate entities. Nevertheless, new artistic ideas of pragmatics and materiality did penetrate through a purist architectural approach, evident in the work of W.R. Lethaby and Ernest Newton. This development encouraged the division of architects with a common value of craftsmanship but in opposition on acceptance of traditional forms. Those abandoning traditional forms promoted the idea of a synthesis of the house and its contents with one designer for both. The Glasgow Movement pioneered by Charles Rennie Mackintosh expanded this idea, emphasizing design as colour, form and atmosphere.

== Part II: Layout and Construction ==
In Part II Muthesius discusses geographical, legal, social and systematic influences upon the planning of the country house. He also introduces the different types of housing existing in England.

=== Local determinants of the English house ===
==== Geographical determinants ====
In England's temperate climate building structures are not so specialized as, for example, in Germany. The climate is humid, however, and needs the good ventilation available through the sash windows and flue.

Sandy soils are more suitable for building due to their better drainage. The widely distributed clay soils, although problematic as a foundation for houses, are processed for bricks, now a common building material. Different materials predominate in different regions; this is due to the historical lack of transport.

==== Factors in social life ====
Muthesius explains that the English (landowners) enjoy a comfortable life and therefore provision must be made for domestic quarters for servants such as a butler and housekeepers. He also notes that the isolated nature of a country house encourages visitors to stay overnight and that therefore houses must be able to cope with temporary increases in numbers.

==== Laws of land tenure ====
In England, leasehold tenure came into being because landowners were unwilling to sell land outright. Land was leased for a given period, an annual rent was paid and the leaseholder could construct a house within the specifications outlined by the owner. At the end of the lease the tenant had to return both land and house to the landowner.

==== Legal determinants ====
The London Building Act 1894 legislates on points of health and fire safety, yet virtually ignores issues of construction. Muthesius is critical of the fact that responsibility for construction is placed upon the individual and only involves authorities if the building is considered a "dangerous structure".

=== Layout of the English house ===
Muthesius identifies privacy as a key reason for the clearly divided design of the house. The layout is separated into residential and servant's quarters to segregate the residents and employees.

==== Plan of the large country house ====
Muthesius details the rooms in the residential quarter of the house:

- Drawing room – Located with a south easterly-aspect due to the need for sunlight and for a view of the garden.
- Dining room – Placed with an easterly aspect due to the undesirability of light during the afternoon. It should be located opposite the drawing room, as residents will gather there before dinner.
- Library – Located on the east to catch the morning sunlight. It should be relatively isolated, often next to the dining room, and substantially ventilated.
- Morning room and breakfast room – Both rooms are to have an easterly aspect to receive morning light.
- Dressing rooms – Located adjacent to the master bedroom.
- Business room – Placed near the front door.
- Billiard room – Should open onto the garden for easy access by visitors without disturbing the household. The common preference is to place it as an annexe to the house.
- Hall – The entrance to the house which provides a connection to the interior. It is undesirable to use rooms as passageways. Adjacent to the hall are a cloakroom, washing place and lavatory to service visitors upon their arrival.
- Bedrooms – Placed on the first floor with a south-easterly aspect for light.
- Bathroom – The bathroom and lavatory must be in separate rooms, and the latter is discreetly placed for aesthetic reasons.
- Spare rooms – Located on the first floor and separated into male and female. Female guests are situated near the daughter’s bedroom whilst male guests are located towards the back of the house so that they may come and go freely via the back door.
- Children’s rooms – Located in a remote part of the house so that they will not disturb visitors. These rooms include night and day nurseries and a schoolroom.

The focus in the domestic quarters is on practicality and not decor. The kitchen is placed in relation to surrounding rooms such as the scullery, larders and storerooms. The employees are housed in these quarters. usually on upper floors. They are serviced by a separate staircase to ensure the separation of employees and residents.

==== Surroundings of the house ====
Muthesius argues for the revival of the formal, symmetrical garden.

He presents a thesis that the house and garden are inextricably linked. The new movement in garden design returns to a perfect, formal plan, with a clearly defined layout and with attention to the cultivation of indigenous plants and flowers. Every garden includes a terrace, flowerbeds and a lawn. The terrace offers a dignified entrance to the typically French garden, which usually includes a central graveled walkway and two to six garden beds. Flowerbeds are commonly divided into geometrical compartments and bordered with wood or terracotta. The English climate encourages the growing of lawns. The idea that lawn preservation requires people to "keep off the grass" is unknown to the English.

==== Smaller country house ====
The growing prosperity of the middle class, coupled with the enthusiasm for nature and rural life, resulted in a boom in smaller country house construction as 'weekend houses'. The small country house is a reduction of a large country house. Its basic form generally involves a hall, drawing room, dining-room, billiard room, and library. When room functions must be compromised due to spatial limitations the hall typically supplies the omitted services. In this house the domestic block is not large enough to be separate and therefore it is treated as one with the main house. However the family and staff quarters still remain segregated.

==== Urban dwelling ====
The plan of an urban dwelling is designed vertically whilst that of the country house is done horizontally. Muthesisus lists the four types of urban dwellings as:

- larger freestanding house,
- urban terraced house,
- block of flats, and
- small suburban house.

In the large freestanding and the urban terraced houses, the domestic quarters are in the basement, the reception rooms on the ground floor and sometimes also on the upper floors with the bedrooms. Flats in a block are too small for domestic quarters. They compensate by having a communal dining room in the attic where food is served from a communal kitchen. Muthesius comments that the rooms of a flat are too small and likens it to hotel life.

== Part III: The Interior ==
In Part III Muthesius discusses materiality and decor.

=== Interior ===
The contemporary interior (ca. 1900) first appeared during the Arts and Crafts Movement and was challenged by groups such as the Victorians and Neo-Palladians. Muthesius presents ideas on structural formation and materiality of the wall, ceiling and floor, and the detailing of the building structure.

==== Wall, ceiling and floor ====
Wall

The wooden partition is presented as the basic wall. The internal space is commonly filled with coke or similar material, for soundproofing and insulation.

In decorative terms the wall is divided using a frieze and a dado, which might be plastered, wallpapered and stencilled. The risk of excessive decoration has encouraged one element to be decorated and the other to be kept fairly plain. The wall can also be undivided; then it is commonly wood paneled, a revival of an Elizabethan form, and sometimes plastered. Wallpapering began as an imitation of materials, but evolved through William Morris and the Arts and Crafts Movement to become a variety of flat patterns commonly of naturalist motifs. Wallpapering expanded its motif range, and also into the use of leather and relief papers. Alternatives to wallpaper were material wall coverings such as cottons, silk and matting.

Ceiling

Ceiling height contributes to the atmosphere; low ceilings are homely, and high ceilings are theatrical. As English ceilings are generally low Muthesius outlines two methods of addressing soundproofing. The first involves inserting mineral wool between the ceiling beams, and the second, producing a shortened form of a double height ceiling. This involves the lower ceiling being constructed independently of, but positioned as close as possible to, the upper floor-bearing ceiling.

In decor the ceiling has returned to its Elizabethan form, which involves either timber with exposed beams or flat patterned stucco. Beams are commonly used in a grid formation for aesthetic purposes and can be left in their natural state or painted. Free-hand stuccowork and inset stucco have also been revived as they enable a small amount of ornamentation on a generally flat surface, although both are quite costly. Ceiling papering has also become popular as it provides visual variety without being obtrusive. Ceiling papers differ from wallpapers in that their patterns are non-directional and powdered so as they do not become overbearing.

Floor

The use of carpeting raises hygiene concerns although it is the accepted flooring option. Therefore it is common for the carpet to be loose rather than fitted, so that it can be removed and cleaned. The carpet also does not usually cover the whole floor area; a strip of flooring, usually wooden parquet, is left exposed around the edges of the room. Parquet flooring is not the most suitable option because its cavities may harbour dust and pests.

Widespread use of carpet is a new phenomenon, resulting from the development of the Jacquard loom. Previously carpets were hand woven and thus expensive. He notes that Japanese felt and Indian matting are also used for their aesthetic appeal whilst linoleum is regarded as appropriate only for purely utilitarian rooms such as the lavatory.

==== Openings in the wall ====
Fireplace

The fireplace is important as a facilitator of domestic comfort, family happiness and as a decorative focal point. The elements of the fireplace are described, noting that the grate, chimneypiece and fireplace recess have offered most potential for artistic development. Muthesisus also remarks that technological advances such as the throttle, which opens and closes the flue and thus the up draught, have lowered the rate of fuel consumption.

Doors

The modern movement in art has been restrictive on the number and size of doors and the presence of a threshold. The common use of metal for the door’s fingerplate is unsatisfactory due to frequency of use and the resulting smudged appearance. Muthesius suggests porcelain as a more viable option. He also questions the use of the doorknob as opposed to the lever, which is more practical.

Windows

Muthesius discusses the use of the sash, casement and fixed leaded windows. The sash and fixed leaded windows, unlike the casement, are self-contained. Both sash and casement windows are able to effectively regulate airflow and remain in position once opened. The sash window is more commonly used whilst the casement is considered un-English and thus only used in the form of a French window. Coloured glass and window coverings such as curtains and blinds are used for their aesthetic appeal.

=== Furnishing of individual residential rooms ===
In this section Muthesius considers the application of materiality in combination with the selection of furnishings for the creation of room-specific atmospheres.

==== Hall ====
The hall provides the visitor's first impression of the house. It promotes a homely, warm atmosphere through its heavy hardwood furnishings. Typical furnishings include a fireplace, a hall table where visitors may rest their belongings, a bench seat, two chairs in front of the fireplace, a tall case clock and a seat by the front door for the servant on duty to receive visitors.

==== Dining-room ====
The dining room has a relaxed atmosphere. For this reason, the floor is carpeted and the walls wood paneled and in some cases the frieze is painted. Furnishings generally include a telescoping table, Chippendale chairs and a sideboard. The table with its setting dominates the room.

==== Drawing room ====
The drawing room is a peaceful space where people gather and converse. Therefore it is commonly decorated using white wood paneling or a delicate relief pattern on the wall, a flat or sparsely patterned ceiling, and a carpeted floor. A drawing room may have several functions, as a reception, music or living room, but each arrangement remains a pleasant place to be. Generally a suite of chairs including a sofa, upholstered armchairs and low chairs in front of the fireplace, a set of tables for display and use, a china cabinet and piano create an impression of comfort.

==== Library ====
This space is described as dignified, with male influence dominant. Floor to ceiling wooden bookcases containing largely leather-bound books line at least three of the walls with the unoccupied wall paneled. Thick carpet lines the floor to minimize noise, and wooden armchairs provide seating. In the centre is a table for studying books.

==== Billiard room ====
The billiard room is a cosy space primarily used by male residents and their friends. Wood is a common wall (as paneling) and floor treatment. A wide runner, however, covers the floor under and around the billiard table. The raised platform distinguishes the players, with a series of upholstered chairs for observers. An ingle-nook also provides a comfortable corner for non-players.

=== Bedroom and ancillary rooms ===
==== Master bedroom ====
Increasing awareness of hygiene has had an influence on the design of the bedroom. Typically white paint or wood paneling is used on the walls, as it is the colour of immaculate cleanliness. Wooden boards or blocks, in combination with small rugs, are desirable flooring options as they are easily cleaned; Muthesius suggests that the only reason carpet remains the most common flooring option is because people are used to it. Built-in cupboards are common as a way of minimising the clutter and facilitating cleaning. A bed, washstand and dressing table are common pieces of furniture.

==== Dressing rooms ====
It is unacceptable for a man and a woman to undress in the same room. The dressing room provides a place for the man (or the woman) to undress privately and to store clothes and is therefore decorated simply.

==== Nurseries ====
Children spend their time in either the day or night nursery. As it is a stimulating environment, it is decorated with bright paint or paper and several pictures are hung on the walls. Furniture in the day nursery includes a toy cupboard, bookshelf and play-table. The night nursery is furnished with beds for a nurse and the children.

==== Bathrooms ====
The bathroom has evolved to become more practical, particularly with the displacement of the geyser. Walls and floors are treated in water-repellent materials – walls commonly being finished in polished plaster or tiles, and floors using tiles or marble. As bathing has become enjoyable the bath is central and is usually finished in porcelain or sometimes copper. Other furniture includes a washbasin, bidet, shower and mirror.

== Bibliography ==
- Muthesius, H. (1979) [1904]. The English House (Single volume ed.). Frogmore: Granada Publishing. ISBN 0-258-97101-0.
- Muthesius, H. (2007) [1904]. Dennis Sharp (ed.). The English House (Facsimile of 1904 ed.). Frances Lincoln. ISBN 978-0711226883.
