= Fingerplate =

Fingerplate or finger-plate may refer to:

- Fingerplate (door), an item of door furniture
- part of a rotary-dial telephone that rotates when dialing numbers
