= Usha Raje =

Maharani of Indore since 1961

Usha Devi
- Maharani

Maharani of Indore
- Reign: 5 December 1961 – present
- Predecessor: Yashwant Rao Holkar II (as Maharaja)
- Heir apparent: Yeshwant Rao Holkar
- Born: Usha Raje; 20 October 1933 (age 92); Paris, France
- Spouse: Satish Chandra Malhotra (m. 1958)
- Issue: Ranjit Malhotra; Dalip Malhotra
- House: Holkar
- Father: Yashwant Rao Holkar II
- Mother: Sanyogita Bai Holkar

Usha Devi (born 20 October 1933) has been titular Maharani of Indore since 5 December 1961.

== Early life, family, and education ==
Usha was born on 20 October 1933 in Paris to Yashwant Rao Holkar II, the Maharaja of Indore, and his first wife, Sanyogita Bai Holkar. Her mother died on 13 July 1937 in Switzerland while she was 3 years and 8 months old. In 1938, her father built her a three-storey ultra-modern 25-bedroom mansion in Laguna Beach, California, at a cost of US$50,000. But his second wife, Margaret Branyan, got this mansion in the divorce settlement in 1943. She received her education in the United States and England. While in the States, she studied at Hoover Elementary School in Santa Ana. She married Satish Chandra Malhotra in 1958, and the two have two children together: Ranjit Malhotra and Dalip Malhotra.

== Heir-apparent ==
As her brother Richard Holkar was recognised neither by the British government nor by their successive Government of India as the legitimate successor to their father, she was recognised as heir-apparent to her father by the Government of India in 1950. Following which, she was sent letters by the President of India, the Prime Minister of India, the States Ministry of India and many of the rulers of Madhya Pradesh, who all acknowledged in their letters that she was the rightful heir to her father.

== Reign ==
Usha acceded to the Indore throne on her father's death on 5 December 1961. At first, the Government of India was reluctant to grant her succession recognition and considered her grandfather, Tukoji Rao Holkar III, and others as potential claimants to the title, rank and dignity of ruler of Indore instead of her. Eventually, on account of the unsuitability of her grandfather and the unavailability of suitable claimants, the Government had to recognise her succession. On 3 May 1962, the President of India formally recognised her as ruler of Indore with effect from 5 December 1961. The Government had at the same time reduced her privy purse to Rs. 5,00,000 and made it clear that she will be known by the title and style of Her Highness Maharani Usha Devi of Indore. The Government also made it clear that her succession is limited to her own lifetime and her children would not succeed her, and that her case is an exception which does not set a precedent for any other state. They also made it clear that after her the question of succession to the Indore throne will be open to the Government to consider. On 19 September 1970, the President of India derecognised her as the ruler of Indore.

== Later life ==
On 26 March 2026, a ceremony as per her wishes was held at the Malhari Martand Deosthan inside the Rajwada, and her nephew, Yeshwant Rao Holkar, was appointed as her uttaradhikari, or successor.

== Titles and styles ==
Usha has held numerous titles starting with her birth as the daughter of the Maharaja Holkar, following her marriage, and upon her accession to the throne of Indore. Each is listed below; where two dates are shown, the first indicates the date of receiving the award or title, and the second indicates the date of its loss or renunciation.

- 20 October 1933 – 1958: Maharajkumari Shrimant Usha Bai Raje Sahiba
- 1958 – 5 December 1961: Maharajkumari Shrimant Akhand Soubhagyavati Usha Bai Raje Sahiba
- 5 December 1961 – present: Her Highness Maharani Usha Devi of Indore
