= Anna Muthesius =

German fashion designer, singer, and author (1870–1961)

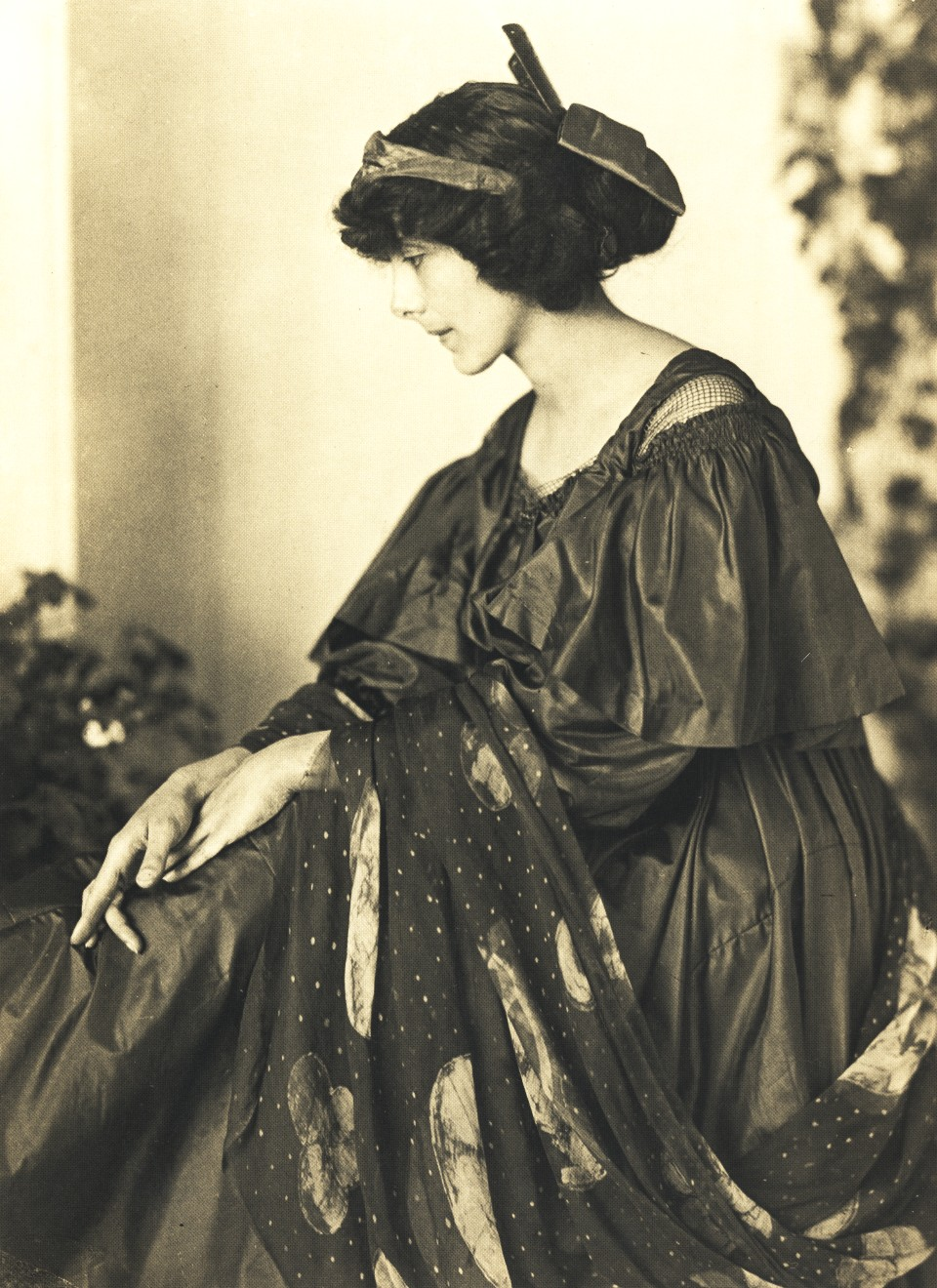
- Photograph by Jacob Hilsdorf
- Born: Anna Trippenbach; 8 December 1870; Aschersleben
- Died: 30 March 1961 (aged 90); Berlin
- Spouse: Hermann Muthesius

Anna Muthesius born Anna Trippenbach (8 December 1870 – 30 March 1961) was a German fashion designer, concert singer, and author from Aschersleben.

== Life ==
She was born Anna Trippenbach in 1870.

In concert with Paul Schultze-Naumburg and Henry van de Velde, Anna Muthesius was instrumental in creating models of female reform clothing.

In 1895 Max Koner painted her portrait under the title of "Fräulein Trippenbach".

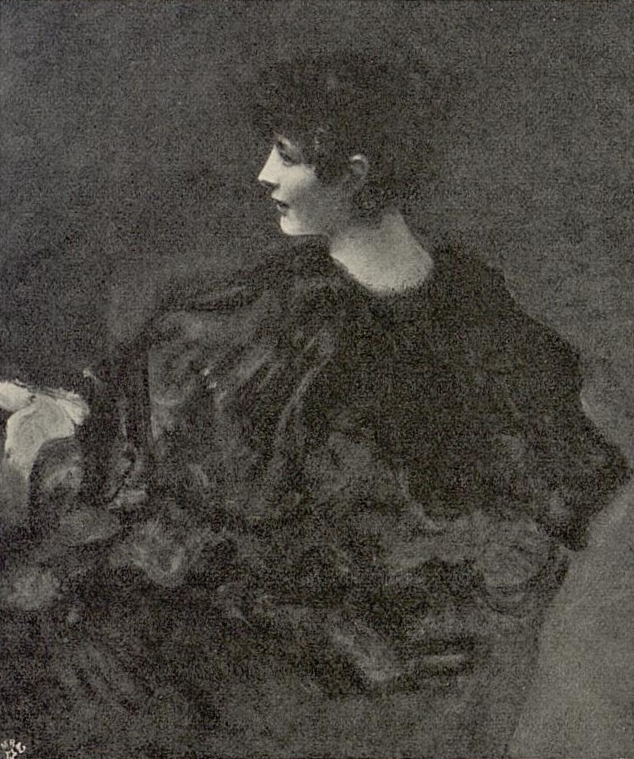
Max Koner – Fräulein Trippenbach (Anna Muthesius), 1895

The following year she married the aspiring architect Hermann Muthesius. They moved to London as the Kaiser had offered him a position as cultural attaché at the German Embassy in London. They were anglophiles who decided to live in an artist's colony despite having rooms offered in the prestigious Carlton House Terrace near the embassy. They were regular visitors to Glasgow where they became fans of the Willow Tearooms.

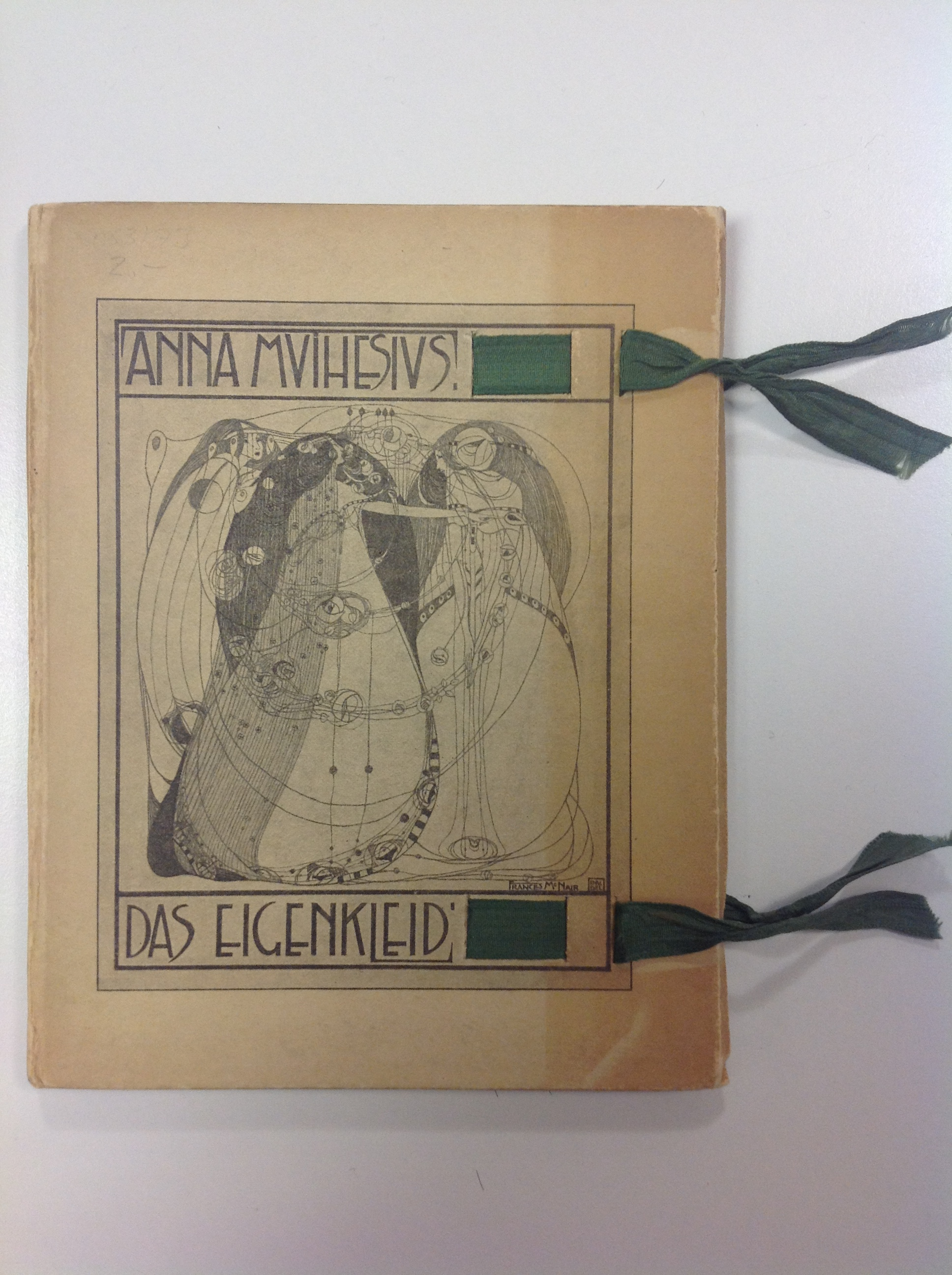
Anna Muthesius's 1903 book with a cover and binding by Frances MacDonald

She met leading British designers and Frances MacDonald of the Glasgow School designed the Art Nouveau cover of her first book in 1903. Muthesius was an advocate of Anti-fashion and her book, Das Eigenkleid der Frau (Women's Own Dress) encourages women to decide for themselves what to wear. She wrote that they should choose the style and fabrics of their clothing based on aesthetics and they should not follow the dictates of fashion. She felt that women were being exploited by German clothing industrialists and they should decide on their own designs. The book which incorporated a novel binding designed by MacDonald is considered an important contribution to the Artistic Dress movement.

She died on 30 March 1961 in Berlin. She was survived by her son Eckart Muthesius who became a noted architect.

== See also ==
- Winfried Muthesius

== Books ==
- Das Eigenkleid der Frau (Women's Own Dress), 1903
