= Hermann Muthesius =

German architect, author and diplomat

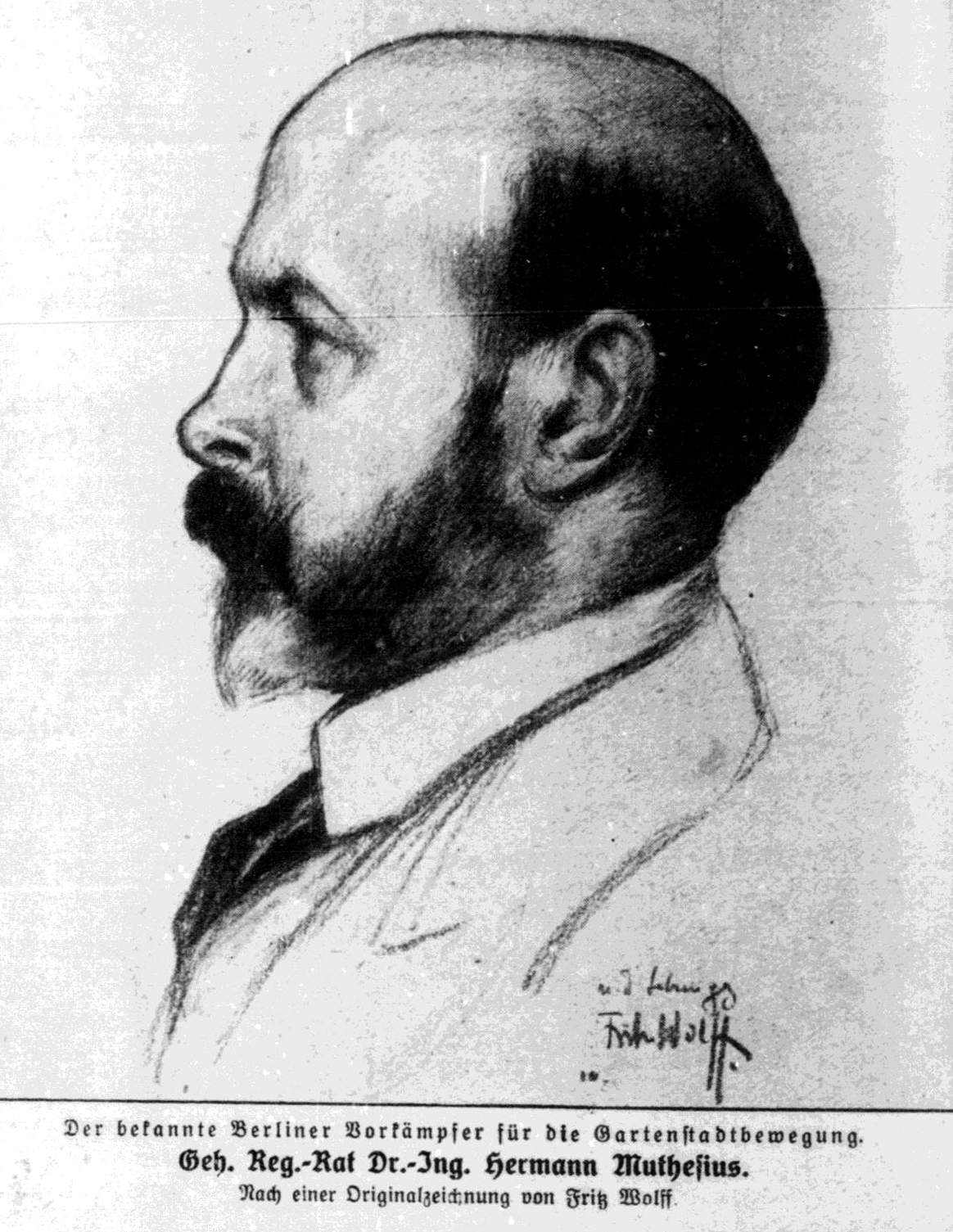
- A 1911 illustration of Muthesius
- Born: April 20, 1861; Großneuhausen, Thuringia, German Empire
- Died: October 29, 1927 (aged 66); Berlin, Weimar Republic
- Education: Frederick William University, Technische Hochschule Berlin
- Known for: architect, author, diplomat
- Movement: Arts and Crafts movement
- Spouse: Anna Trippenbach

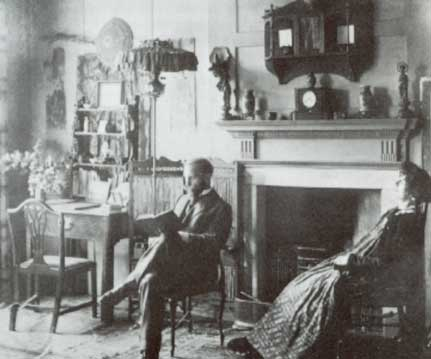
Hermann Muthesius with his wife Anna at The Priory, Hammersmith, in 1900

Adam Gottlieb Hermann Muthesius (20 April 1861 – 29 October 1927), known as Hermann Muthesius, was a German architect, author and diplomat, perhaps best known for promoting many of the ideas of the English Arts and Crafts movement within Germany and for his subsequent influence on early pioneers of German architectural modernism such as the Bauhaus.

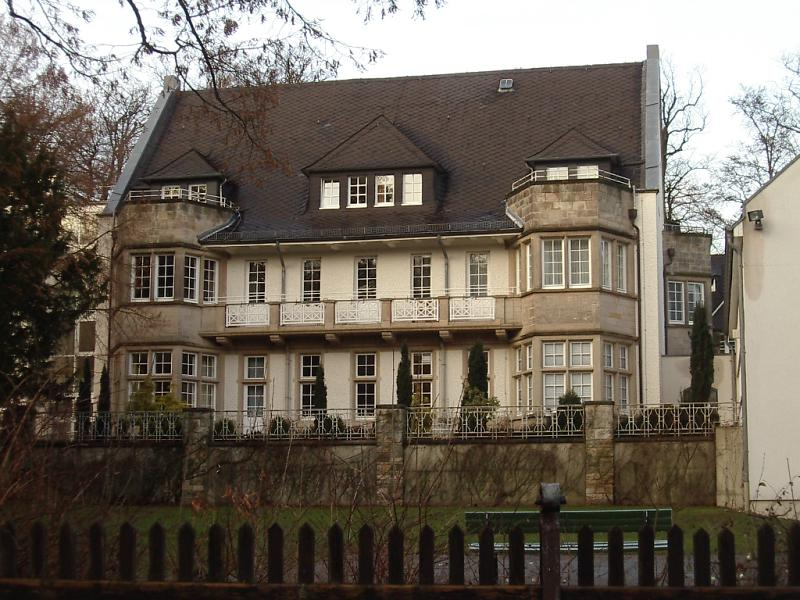
Southern facade of the Elena-Klinik in Harleshausen, a district of Kassel, whose main building was originally built by Hermann Muthesius as a villa. 2004-12-24

== Early life and education ==
Muthesius was born in 1861 in the village of Großneuhausen near Erfurt and received early training from his father, who was a builder. After a period of military service and two years studying philosophy and art history at Frederick William University in Berlin, he enrolled to study architecture at the Technische Hochschule in Charlottenburg (now Technische Universität Berlin) in 1883, while also working in the office of Reichstag architect Paul Wallot.

== Career ==
Following completion of his studies, Muthesius spent 1887 to 1891 working for German construction firm Ende & Böckmann in Tokyo. There he saw his first building completed—a German Evangelical church in the Gothic Revival style—and was able to travel extensively across Asia. He returned to Germany in 1891 where he worked for the Prussian Ministry of Public Works, studied for a time in Italy on stipend (in 1895), and served for almost two years as the editor of a pair of official construction journals.

=== London ===
In 1896, Muthesius was offered a position as cultural attaché at the German Embassy in London. Muthesius married Anna Trippenbach who was a fashion designer and singer. This gave him the opportunity to study the ways of the British. He focused the next six years investigating residential architecture and domestic lifestyle and design, ending with a three-volume report published in 1904 and 1905 as Das englische Haus ("The English House"), his most famous work. Although his subjects were wide-ranging, he was particularly interested in the philosophy and practices of the English Arts and Crafts movement, whose emphasis on function, modesty, understatement, individuality and honesty to materials he saw as alternatives to the ostentatious historicism and obsession with ornament in German nineteenth century architecture, and whose efforts to bring a sense of craftsmanship to industrial design he saw as a significant national economic benefit. He visited Glasgow to investigate the innovative work of the Glasgow School exemplified by the designs of Charles Rennie Mackintosh, and wrote about houses in Birmingham by William Bidlake.

As well as his official reports, Muthesius also developed a career as an author, communicating his ideas and observations in an influential series of books and articles that saw him become a significant cultural figure in Germany, culminating in Das englische Haus. His wife wrote about Anti-fashion and how she felt that women were being exploited by German clothing industrialists. Her book which incorporated a novel binding designed by Frances MacDonald is considered an important contribution to the Artistic Dress movement.

Muthesius wrote about Glasgow's Willow Tearooms for an issue of Dekorative Kunst published in 1905 which was almost entirely devoted to A Mackintosh Tea Room in Glasgow, saying that "Today any visitor to Glasgow can rest body and soul in Miss Cranston's Tea Rooms and for a few pence drink tea, have breakfast and dream that he is in fairy land." At the same time he lamented Mackintosh's unrewarded struggle to "hold up the banner of Beauty in this dense jungle of ugliness."

=== Germany ===
Muthesius returned to Germany in 1904 and established himself as an architect in private practice, while retaining a role as an official advisor to the Government of Prussia focusing his time on reforming art and design education in order that more emphasis be put on workshop training.

Over the next two decades he designed a series of houses throughout Germany, drawing upon and cementing the principles and practices expounded in his famous book.

=== The "Muthesius Affair" and the Deutscher Werkbund ===
By this time Muthesius was widely recognised as an admirer of English culture, but this also laid him open to accusations of divided loyalties. In 1907 he was accused by the Fachverband für die wirtschaftlichen Interessen des Kunstgewerbes ("Trade Association for the Economic Interests of the Arts and Crafts") of criticising the quality of German industrial products in a lecture in Berlin. The resulting controversy saw several influential designers and industrialists withdraw from the association and set up the Deutscher Werkbund ("German Association of Craftsmen"), explicitly aimed at bringing the highest standards of design to mass-produced output.

The Deutscher Werkbund was a major influence on the early careers of Le Corbusier, Walter Gropius and Mies van der Rohe, but although Muthesius was in many ways its spiritual father and served as its chairman from 1910 until 1916, he had little sympathy with the emerging early-modernism, considering both Art Nouveau and the later designs of the Bauhaus to be just as much superficial styles as those of the nineteenth century.

Muthesius was one of the major architects who built Germany's first Garden City, Hellerau, a suburb of Dresden, founded in 1909. Its foundation was closely related with the activities of the Deutscher Werkbund, too. Among the many employees of Muthesius was the German Socialist city planner Martin Wagner, who applied the lessons of the garden city to Berlin on a huge scale, from 1924 to about 1932.

== Death and legacy ==
Muthesius continued designing houses and writing about domestic architecture until 29 October 1927, when he died in a road accident after a site visit in Berlin.

The school Städtische Handwerker und Kunstgewerbeschule (English: Municipal Crafts and Arts and Crafts School) opened in 1907 in Kiel, Germany, and after World War II in 1945 the school was renamed Muthesius-Werkschule Kiel für Handwerk und angewandte Kunst (English: Muthesius Factory School Kiel for Handicrafts and Applied Arts) in his honor.

== Works ==
List of select works by Muthesius:

- Bernhard house (1906), Winkler Straße 11, Berlin-Wilmersdorf, 14193
- Cramer house (1912), Pacelliallee 18, Berlin-Zehlendorf, 14195
- Kitchenette houses in Lichterfelde-West (1909), Unter den Eichen 53 (now present-day Reichensteiner Weg), Berlin, 14195. This building is no longer standing, as of 1970.

== Selected publications ==
- Stilarchitektur und Baukunst ("Style-Architecture and Building-Art") (1902)
- Das englische Haus ("The English House") (1904)
- Wie baue ich mein Haus ("How Do I Build My House") (1915)
- Muthesius, Hermann (1920). Kleinhaus und Kleinsiedlung [Small House and Settlement]. Munich, Germany: F. Bruckmann.

== See also ==
- Winfried Muthesius

== Sources ==
- Woodham, Jonathan (1997), Twentieth-Century Design, New York, NY, USA and London, UK: Oxford University Press, ISBN 0192842048, OCLC 35777427
