= Winfried Muthesius =

German painter

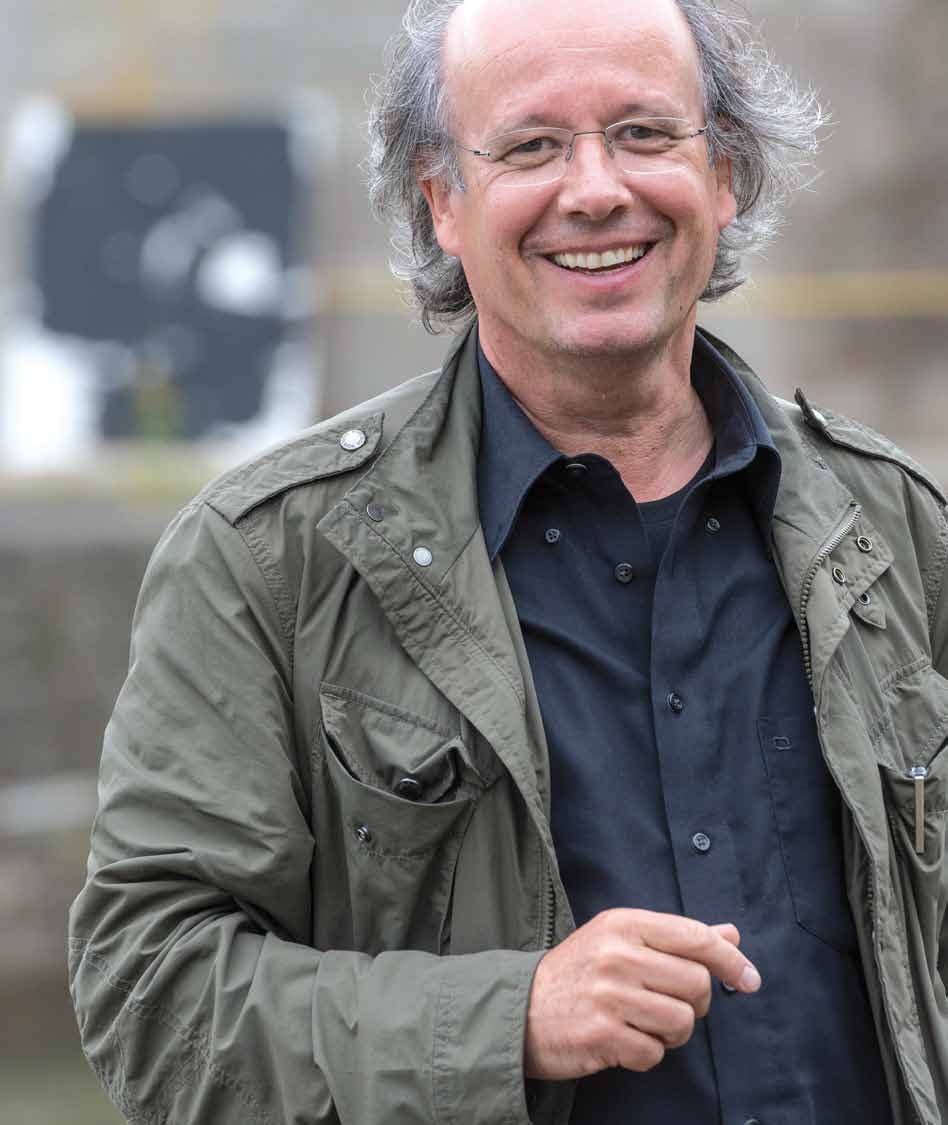
- Muthesius in 2014
- Born: 28 August 1957 (age 68); Berlin, Germany
- Education: Berlin University of the Arts
- Known for: Painting, photography, installation art
- Website: muthesius.com

Winfried Muthesius (born 28 August 1957 in Berlin) is a German painter, photographer and installation artist.

== Life ==
Muthesius' great-grand uncle and aunt were German architect Hermann Muthesius and fashion designer Anna Muthesius. Since the 2001 death of his wife, Marianne Muthesius, he has owned a real-estate company. Muthesius is the father of Laura Muthesius (born 22 February 1990), a blogger and photographer. He lives and works in Berlin and Brandenburg.

== Artistic work ==
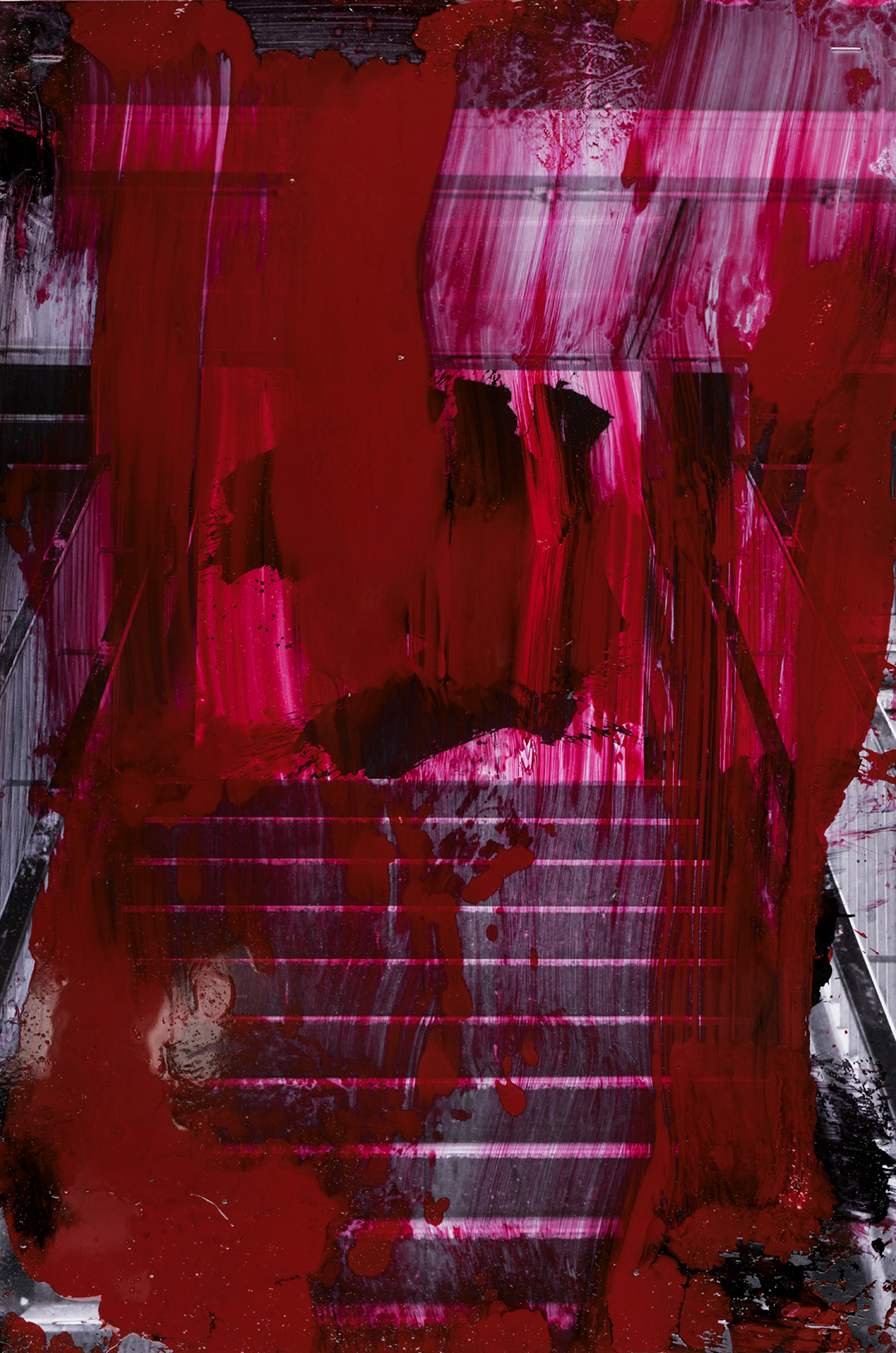
X-Serie II, pittura oscura (2016)

Muthesius studied at the Berlin School of Arts (today the Berlin University of the Arts) from 1979 to 1984. He was a student of Hermann Wiesler, whose designs influenced him. Muthesius' first artistic stay abroad led him to the Accademia di Belle Arti in Florence in 1982–83. His work there focused on the city's architecture. Based on many sketches, Muthesius created his first works in Indian ink, watercolor, tempera and oil.

In 1982, he made the Brandenburg Gate in his home city of Berlin a motif in his works. These works demonstrate that Muthesius employs design through reduction, laying down the foundation of his present painting style. He received a working scholarship to the Künstlerhaus Salzburg in 1987, and a series of Salzburg pictures dates to this time. In 1988 he visited New York City for the first time, and has returned regularly ever since. In New York, Muthesius sketched soaring room perspectives and architectural highlights, particularly of the World Trade Center. In the aftermath of the September 11 attacks, he has been creating work relating to Ground Zero. When he received a working scholarship from the Berlin Senate in 1989, he continued using the Brandenburg Gate—the intersection of East and West—as his central motif.

Muthesius' first series of "cross pictures" and "skull pictures" date to 1991 and 1992, and he has continued them until the present. He began to develop the technique of pittura oscura in 1992. These are multi-layered pictures which give the effect of depth, combining photography and painting: Muthesius creates a painting, derived from a sketch. It is then positioned in a public room and photographed. The photograph is painted over, and again reproduced.

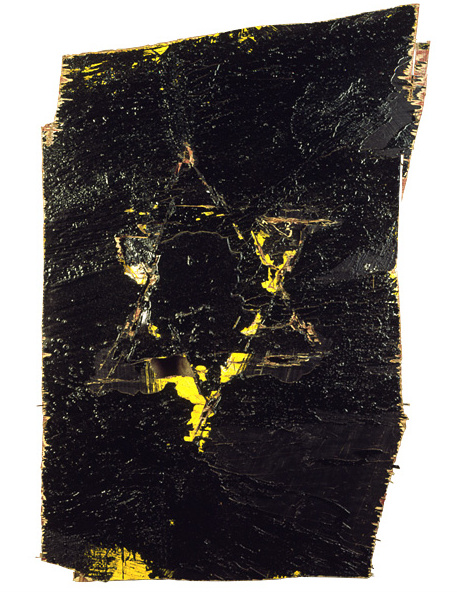
Star (1995) Photograph: Jörg von Bruchhausen

The Star series of large-format images was created in 1995. The subject of the Star and Cross series is violence in the past and present. Stars of David, beaten in with an axe and a chainsaw, explore the expulsion of the Jewish communities over the centuries as a reminder of the need for respect.

In the Cross pictures, Muthesius dissolves the static cross and creates an impression of movement. The crosses were applied with bitumen and oil on a large-format support made of wood.

Muthesius has focused to monochrome images in gold, such as the Golden Fields (the tabula aurea in the State Collection of Antiquities and Glyptothek, Munich) and Der Himmel unter Berlin, since 2002. From this, he developed a "broken gold" technique. The support, decorated with gold leaf, is then partially destroyed and scratched on the surface. This illustrates brittleness and vulnerability in time.

Muthesius is inspired by the concrete forms in a room, which he outlines, paints, photographs, paints over, further processes, installs and places in new contexts. He intends to bring the observer into a conflict of perception which might alter their perspectives and views. Muthesius' starting point is an object whose core he reveals with a variety of techniques and reductions in several processes.

== Analysis ==
According to Hermann Wiesler, "The Skull pictures by Muthesius directly refer back to life 'In the serious ossuary' (Goethe) ... "a source of life arose from death.'"

Jörn Merkert wrote about Brandenburg Gates:

Again we encounter the contradictory nature that is so characteristic for Winfried Muthesius’ attitude which we have already illustrated in numerous contexts; this time in the simultaneousness of the conscious and unconscious. Or in the state where unambiguousness and precision in architecture in his art of painting is described with transparent, mobile means ... On a spiritual level, he shows an entirely different territorial set – a terrain where he was the first to have researched it and the international abstract expressionism has not yet explored.

Christoph Tannert wrote about Star:

With this series of pictures, Muthesius has created a commemorative series which requires emptiness, for it intends to demonstrate something that has been removed from the German cultural circle after all the racist violent attacks that are still occurring in Germany ... The striking of the axe thematises past and present violence ... Up to now, the material bitumen is associated with something like burning asphalt and burnt soil. Muthesius refers to our collective memory through the construction of which he demands from the observer ...

Thomas A. Baltrock wrote about Cross:

Winfried Muthesius ... draws our attention without binding it. His cross is presence, no reference, and thus obtains ancient ecclesiastical traditions which have long been forgotten in the historical concoctions which are presented to us in a lot of the pieces found in new "church art".

Thomas Sternberg wrote about Golden Fields:

They are no elaborate installations but unexpected, quiet interventions in public space. For God may be found in the simplest, most miserable and completely trivial places of daily life. As Joseph Beuys once put it: "The mysteries take place in the central station".

Christoph Tannert wrote about Pittura Oscura:

The incorporated photographic images, of course, refer to places which can be clearly identified ... Muthesius has in mind not only discontinuities, he celebrates them ... Muthesius puts his finger on the sore spot of the inadequacy, knowing that the essence still needs to happen.

== Bibliography ==
- Winfried Muthesius. Berlin-Bilder. Berlin 1985.
- Winfried Muthesius. Peinture. M.P.M. Project Bastille, Paris 1988.
- Live Kunst: with Frank Dornseif and Winfried Muthesius from the Martin-Gropius-Bau. ZDF 1989
- Friedhelm Mennekes (ed.): Winfried Muthesius. Peinture – Painting – Malerei. Münsterschwarzach 1990 (exhibition catalog in Paris, Cologne, Berlin, New York).
- Gallery vier (ed.): Winfried Muthesius. Brandenburger Tore. Berlin 1991 (catalog of the exhibition in Leverkusen, Cologne, Berlin and Paris).
- Thomas A. Baltrock (ed.): Winfried Muthesius. ZeitBrüche. Lübeck 1992.
- Thomas Sternberg (ed.): Winfried Muthesius. hell Schützenhofbunker. Eine Installation von Winfried Muthesius. Münster 1994.
- Deutsche Gesellschaft für christliche Kunst (ed.): Winfried Muthesius. ZeitBrüche – unentwegte Kreuzwege. Munich 1995.
- Thomas Sternberg (ed.): Winfried Muthesius. Himmel, Malerei. Münster 2001.
- Winfried Muthesius. Stern. Berlin, Trier 2002 (catalog of the exhibition in Bischöfliches Dom- und Diözesanmuseum Trier, in cooperation with Galerie Michael Schultz, Berlin, and the Stiftung St. Matthäus).
- Winfried Muthesius. Golden Fields – Der Himmel unter Berlin. Münster 2003 (catalog of the exhibition in Berlin underground stations as part of the Ecumenical Church Day in Berlin).
- Jürgen Lenssen (ed.): Winfried Muthesius. ZeitBrüche. Bonn 2014.
