= Manik Bagh =

Palace in Madhya Pradesh, India

Coordinates: 22°41′33″N 75°51′23″E

Manik Bagh, also spelled Manig Bagh, is a palace of the Holkar Maharaja of Indore State in Indore, Madhya Pradesh. The name means "Ruby Garden" or "Gem Garden". It was designed and built by the German architect Eckart Muthesius on behalf of Maharaja Yashwant Rao Holkar II in 1930. On the outside and the inside it was in the Bauhaus and Art Deco style, making it a Gesamtkunstwerk.

== History ==
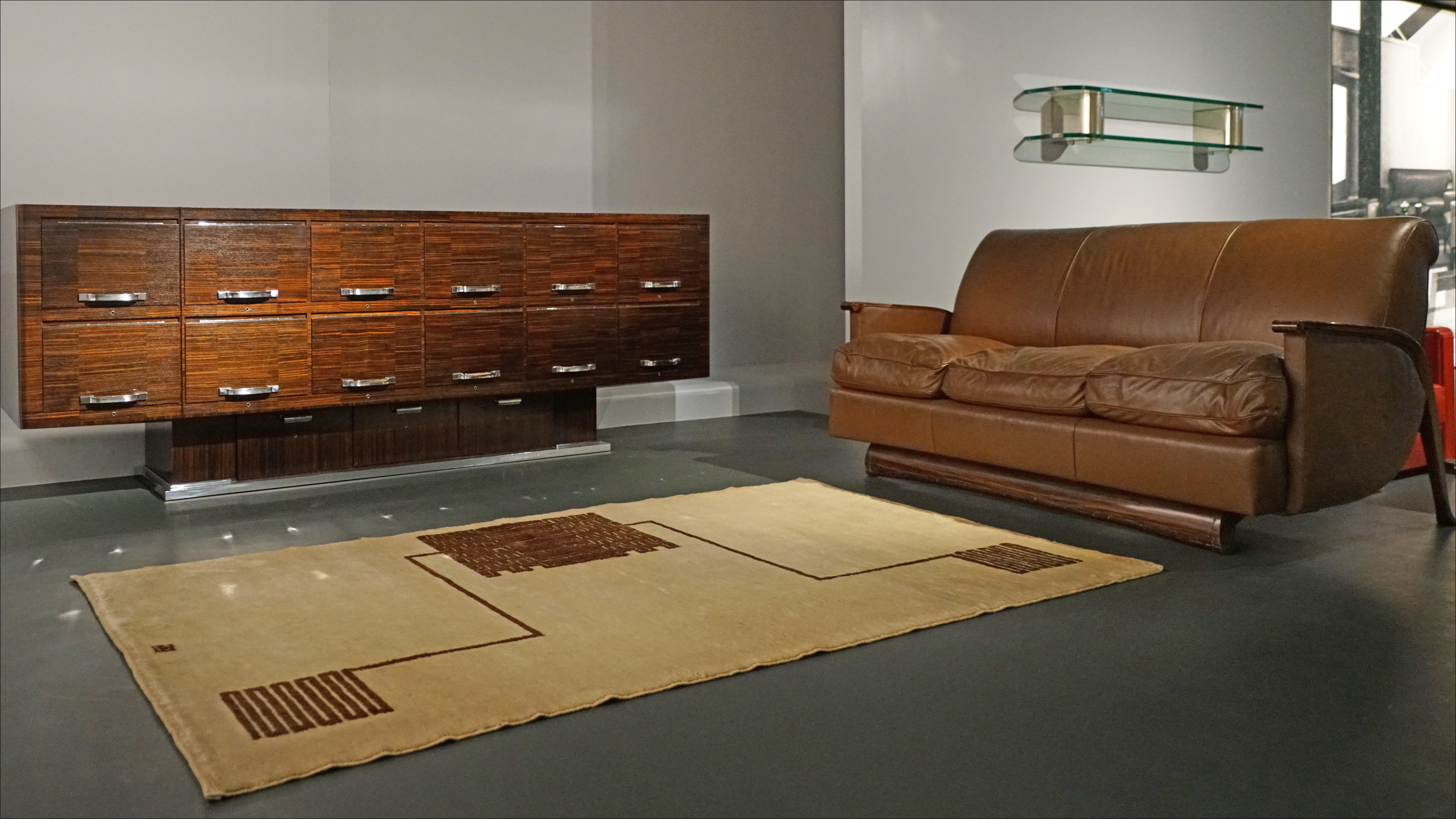
Furniture pieces from Manik Bagh, designed by Émile-Jacques Ruhlmann in 1932, in an exhibition at the Musée des Arts Décoratifs, Paris

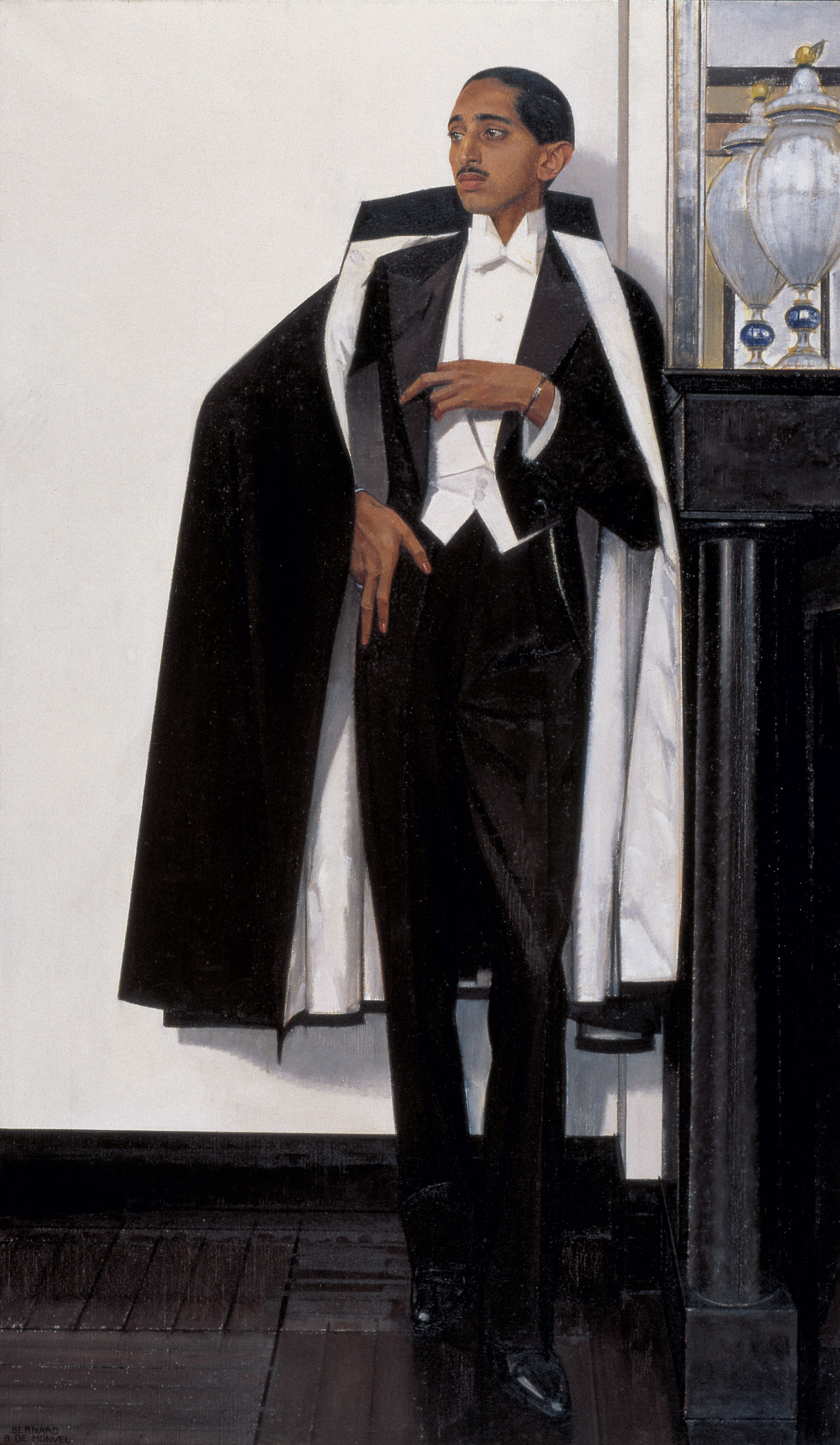
The Maharajah of Indore portrait by Bernard Boutet de Monvel, (1929)

The palace was commissioned by Maharaja Yashwant Rao Holkar II for the use of himself and his wife Sanyogita Devi. It was built and furnished between 1930 and 1939 by the German architect Eckart Muthesius, and its design combines the Bauhaus style in architecture and Art Deco in the interior decoration. The prince and the architect had first met in 1928 in England.

The 40 rooms of the U-shaped building were all connected directly or through terraces. For the 80 or so servants in the house a separate external corridor was created. Because the walls could neither be wallpapered nor covered with silk due to the high humidity of the rainy months, Muthesius decided to come up with a solution by having the finest glass dust blown on the previously prepared walls. The floor was laid out in marble.

The furniture, which was predominantly shaped according to the Bauhaus model, was made of black ebony, as were most of the columns. Muthesius designed for example the bar, lamps and some furniture. The furniture was partly dismantled in Berlin, packed and shipped to Indore. A friend of the maharaja, Henri-Pierre Roché brought together for him a crystal service by Baccarat, silverware by Jean Puiforcat customised with the royal arms, a deckchair by Eileen Gray, a floor lamp by Jean Perzel, a chaiselongue by Le Corbusier and screens by Drian. The aluminium beds were made by Louis Sognot and Charlotte Alix. Famous French designer Jacques-Émile Ruhlmann designed a "Studio for a Crown Prince of the Indies" with a huge map of India on the wall. The black and orange carpets with geometric patterns were by Ivan da Silva-Bruhns.

Two large double-portraits of the maharajah and his wife were done by Bernard Boutet de Monvel in 1929 and were placed in the palace.

In the garden, there was a project to create a garden with a "temple of meditation", with an installation of the bird sculptures by Brancusi that the maharaja owned. With the premature death of the maharani the project was never completed.

Muthesius had to leave India after the outbreak of the World War II. After the premature death of his wife Sanyogita Devi, the maharajah started to retreat from his interest in contemporary art and architecture and returned less to Manik Bagh. The interior decoration was sold and in 1980 auctioned at Sotheby's in Monaco. Manik Bagh is now used by the Office of the Commissioner, CGST, Customs & Central Excise, India.

The Musée des Arts Décoratifs, Paris had an exhibition in 2019 called "Moderne Maharajah" dedicated to Yashwant Rao Holkar II and Manik Bagh, featuring some of the interior pieces such as the aluminium bed by Louis Sognot and Charlotte Alix, as well as pieces by Jacques-Émile Ruhlmann.

== See also ==
- Art Deco in Mumbai, part of the Victorian and Art Deco Ensemble of Mumbai World Heritage Site
- Narmada Kothi
- Rajwada, main palace of the Maharaja of Indore
- Villa Shodhan by Le Corbusier

== Literature ==
- Reto Niggl: Eckart Muthesius 1930. Der Palast des Maharadschas von Indore. Architektur und Interieur. Arnoldsche, Stuttgart 1996, ISBN 3-925369-55-4
- Reto Niggl, Annette Piening, Nicholas Grindell: Indien / India 1930–1939. Architektur / Architecture, Design, Photography / Fotografie. Munich 1999, ISBN 3-00-003905-8
- Anna Jackson (ed.): Maharaja. Pracht der indischen Fürstenhöfe. (Exhibition catalogue, Kunsthalle Hypo-Kulturstiftung, Munich, 12. February bis 24. May 2010) Hirmer, Munich 2010, ISBN 978-3-7774-2441-5
