= Fingerplate (door) =

Plate on a door to prevent smudges

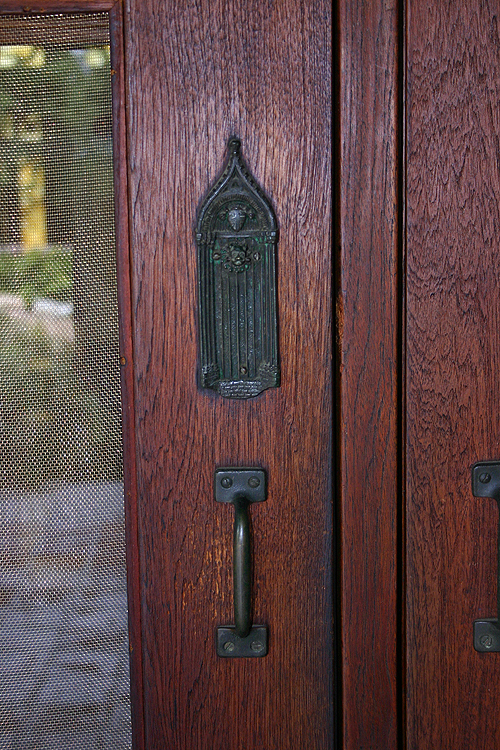
An ornate metal fingerplate

A fingerplate, also known as a pushplate, is a plate that is fixed to a door near the handle or keyhole to prevent soiling of the door, such as through fingerprints. It can be made of metal, plastic, ceramic or glass. Due to this, fingerplates have historically been placed on the interior side of the door. Modern fingerplates do not adhere to this rule and instead, are mostly used for decoration.

Fingerplates are considered distinctive of the Victorian era, which saw many types of decorative door hardware. Victorian fingerplates were designed with stylized vines, patterned barrel, and steeple finials to create an intricate and appealing look.
