= Yashwant Rao Holkar II =

Maharaja of Indore from 1926 to 1948

Yeshwant Rao Holkar II
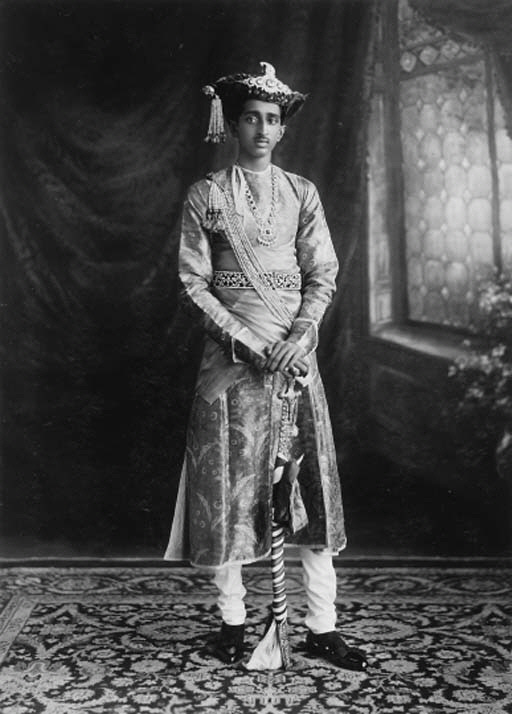
- Investiture of Maharaja Yeshwant Rao Holkar Bahadur of Indore 9th May 1930

Maharaja Holkar of Indore
- Reign: 26 February 1926 – 5 December 1961
- Coronation: 11 March 1926, Juna Rajwada Palace, Indore
- Predecessor: Tukojirao Holkar III
- Successor: Usha Devi

Titular Maharaja Holkar of Indore
- Pretendence: 28 May 1948 – 5 December 1961
- Successor: Usha Devi Holkar
- Born: 6 September 1908; Indore, Indore State, British India
- Died: 5 December 1961 (aged 53); Bombay, Maharashtra, India
- Spouse: Princess Sanyogita of Kagal; Maharani Margaret Holkar; Maharani Euphemia Holkar
- Issue: Maharajkumar Shrimant Shivaji Rao Holkar (Prince Richard Holkar); Maharani Usha Devi Holkar
- House: Holkar
- Father: Tukojirao Holkar III
- Mother: Chadrawati Bai Saheba
- Religion: Hinduism

Maharajadhiraj Raj Rajeshwar Sawai Yeshwant Rao II Holkar XIV Bahadur (6 September 1908 – 5 December 1961) was the Maharaja of Indore (Holkar State, now in present-day Madhya Pradesh) belonging to the Holkar dynasty of the Marathas. With his first wife, Sanyogita Bai Sahib Holkar of Indore, he became known for a life of elegance and extravagance in the 1920s and 30s.

== Biography ==
He was educated at the Cheam School, Charterhouse and Christ Church, Oxford University.

He succeeded his father Tukojirao Holkar III, who abdicated in his favour on 26 February 1926. He was installed on the throne on 11 March 1926 under a regency council. He was invested with full powers on 9 May 1930. On 1 January 1935 he was made a Knight of the Order of the Indian Empire. He established a legislative council for Indore state and created a cabinet with a prime minister and three ministers. K.S. Fitze, a British resident of Indore, noted that Holkar spent considerable time abroad. Christie's art director Amin Jaffer considers this an example of his Western influences.

On 11 August 1947 he signed the Instrument of Accession to India. Indore State was included in the Union of Madhya Bharat on 28 May 1948. He served as the second Rajpramukh of this new state until 31 October 1956. He later worked with the United Nations, though details of his role remain unclear.

He died in a Mumbai hospital on 5 December 1961.

== Manik Bagh ==
In 1930 he commissioned the construction of the Manik Bagh ("Jewel Garden") palace in Indore. The architect was Eckart Muthesius (1904–1989) from Germany. Holkar was at a young age at that time, as was Muthesius, who was only a few years older. The work outside and inside was done in the late Art Deco and international style of modern architecture.

The Musée des Arts Décoratifs, Paris had an exhibition in 2019 called "Moderne Maharajah" dedicated to Yashwant Rao Holkar II and Manik Bagh, featuring some of the interior pieces such as the aluminium bed by Louis Sognot and Charlotte Alix.

Manik Bagh later became a branch of the Indian Customs and Central Excise department.

== Marriage ==
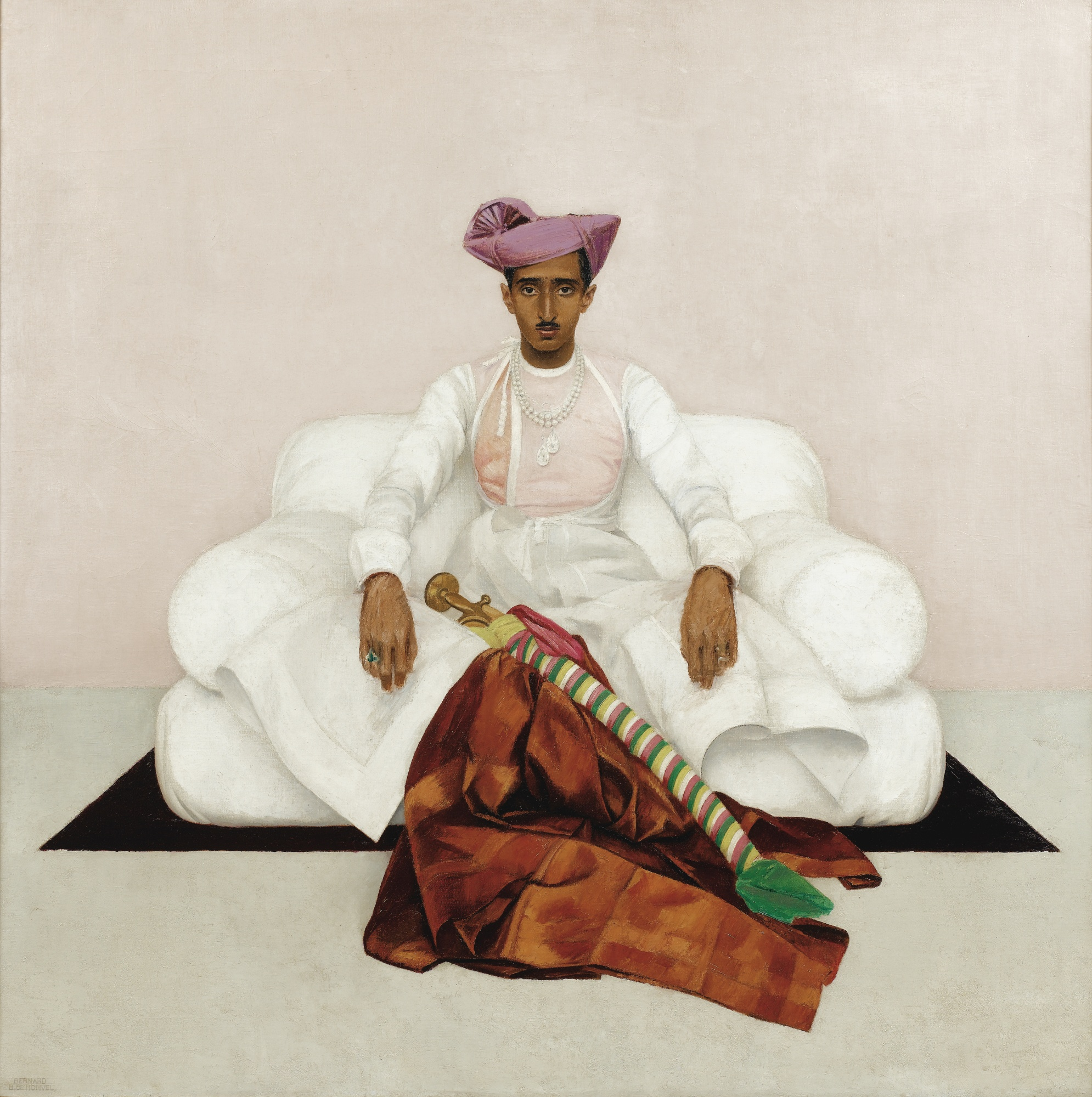
Portrait by Bernard Boutet de Monvel, 1934

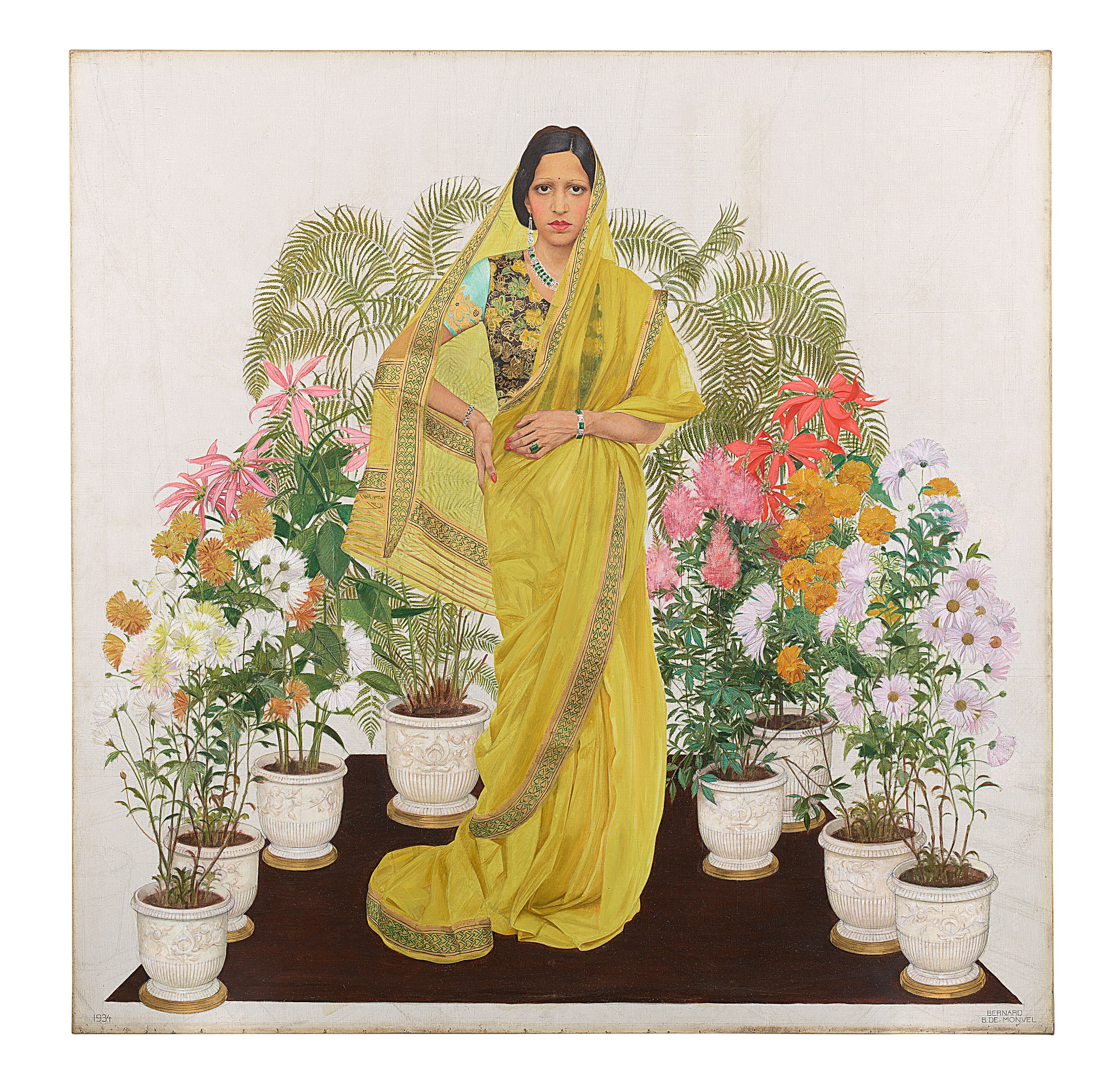
The Maharani of Indore by Bernard Boutet de Monvel (1934)

In 1924 he married Sanyogita Bai Sahib Holkar of Indore. Holkar and his wife Maharani Sanyogita studied in England. Together, they traveled extensively across Europe and were photographed by Man Ray in 1927. Two sets of double portraits were painted by Bernard Boutet de Monvel in 1929 and 1934.

Sanyogita died in 1937 at the age of 22 from complications after an appendectomy in Switzerland.

In 1938 Holkar married Marguerite Lawler, of Fargo, North Dakota. After their divorce, he married Euphemia "Fay" Watt, of Los Angeles (also known as Lady Fay Holkar) in 1943.

He was survived by his two children:

- with Maharani Sanyogita Devi: Maharani Usha Raje of Indore who inherited the titles and rights.
- with Lady Fay Holkar: Maharajkumar Shrimant Shivaji Rao "Richard" Holkar (who has two children: Sabrina Sanyogita Holkar Ellis and Yashwantrao "Randall" Holkar III).

== Honours ==
- Knight Grand Commander of the Order of the Indian Empire (GCIE), 1935
- King George V Silver Jubilee Medal, 1935
- King George VI Coronation Medal, 1937

== See also ==
- Yeshwant Club
- Daly College
- Indore State
- Maratha Empire
- List of Maratha dynasties and states

Yashwant Rao Holkar II Holkar Dynasty Born: 6 September 1908 Died: 5 December 1961
Regnal titles
| Preceded by Tukojirao Holkar III | Maharaja Holkar of Indore; 1926–1948 | Monarchy Abolished Political integration of India |
Titles in pretence
| Monarchy Abolished Political integration of India | — TITULAR — Maharaja Holkar of Indore; 1948–1961 | Succeeded by Usha Devi Holkar |
