= Eckart Muthesius =

German architect

Eckart Muthesius (17 May 1904 in Berlin – 27 August 1989) was a German architect and interior designer.

His most famous commission was the Manik Bagh palace for Maharaja Yashwant Rao Holkar II (1908–1961) for the use of himself and his wife Sanyogita.
