= Khanderao =

Khanderao may refer to:

- Khandoba, a regional Hindu deity, worshipped in Deccan
- Khanderao Dabhade, hereditary title in the family of Senapati of Satara state of Maratha Empire.
- Khanderao II Gaekwad ruled 1856-1870) as Maharaja of Baroda, after whom the Khanderao Market, Baroda is named
- Khanderao Holkar (died 1754), husband of Ahilyabai Holkar (ruled 1767–1795) Indore {Hokar State)
- Khande Rao Holkar (ruled 1799 - 22 February 1807), of Holkar dynasty of the Marathas Maharaja of Indore, born in 1798, died 1807
- Khande Rao Holkar II (ruled 1843 – 1844) as Maharaja of Indore (Hokar State), born 1828, died 17 March 1844
- Apa Khande Rao, c. late 18th century, won Haryana and north India as a feudatory and general under Maharaja Mahadaji Scindia(ruled 1768–1794) of Scindia dynasty that ruled Gwalior State
- Khande Rao Banaji, Dewan of Mysore Kingdom
