= Tukojirao Holkar II =

Maharaja of Indore from 1844 to 1886

His Highness Maharajadhiraja Raj Rajeshwar Sawai Shri Sir Tukoji Rao II Holkar XI Bahadur, Maharaja of Indore, GCSI, CIE
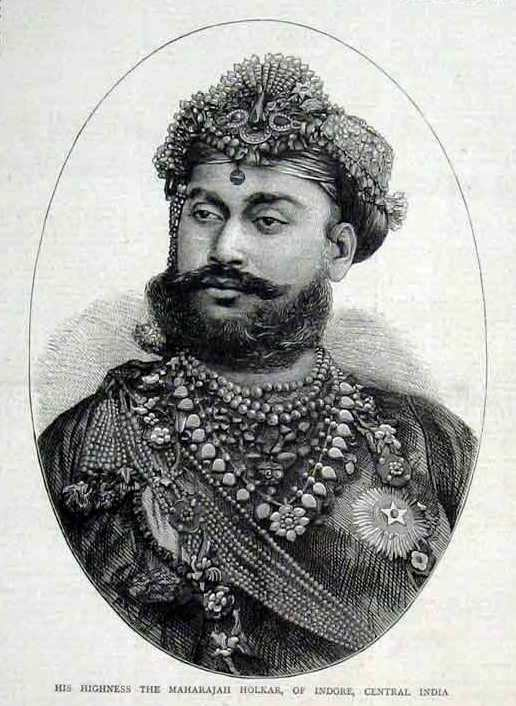
- His Highness the Maharajah Holkar of Indore Central India as seen in The Graphic, 1874

11th Holkar Maharaja of Indore
- Reign: 23 June 1844 – 17 June 1886
- Coronation: 27 June 1844, Juna Rajwada Palace, Indore
- Predecessor: Khande Rao Holkar II
- Successor: Shivajirao Holkar
- Born: 3 May 1835; Karanji (Khurd)Tal - Niphad (Nashik) Maharashtra
- Died: 17 June 1886 (aged 51); Maheshwar
- Issue: Shivajirao Holkar
- Dynasty: Holkar
- Father: Raja Shrimant Santoji Rao Holkar
- Religion: Hinduism

Maharajadhiraj Raj Rajeshwar Sawai Shri Sir Tukoji Rao II Holkar XI Bahadur GCSI CIE (3 May 1835 – 17 June 1886) was the Maharaja of Indore (Holkar State) and a member of the Maratha Holkar dynasty in the Indian subcontinent. His birth name was Shrimant Yukaji Jaswant Holkar. He was the son of Raja Shrimant Santoji Rao Holkar, from the collateral branch of the Holkar dynasty.

== Biography ==
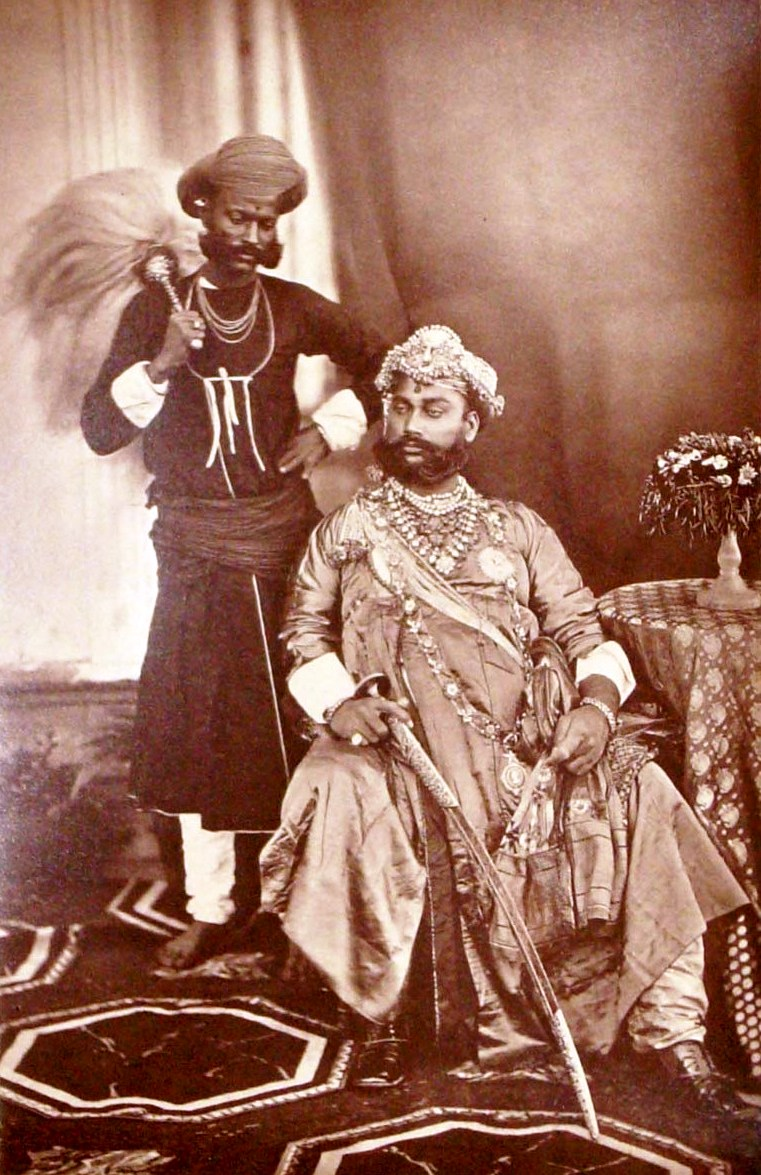
Tukoji II, The Maharaja Holkar of Indore in 1877

On the death of Khande Rao Holkar II in 1844 former Maharaja Marthand Rao Holkar claimed the throne for himself, but his request, backed by many nobles, was not given by the British. Krishna Bai Holkar Sahiba, one of the widows of Yashwant Rao Holkar, suggested the name of the younger son of Bhao Santoji Holkar (uncle of Marthand Rao). The proposal was accepted and the 12-year-old Jaswant Holkar was installed with the regnal name of Tukoji Rao Holkar II on 23 June 1844.

The regency council, controlled by the resident continued. At the age of 16, in 1848, Tukoji Rao II began participating in the government formally. Krishna Bai died in 1849 and Tukoji further expanded his participation in the affairs and soon was granted all the powers (8 March 1852) on attaining 20 years of age. In this period many reforms were introduced.

In 1846 he married Maharani Shrimant Akhand Soubhagyavati Mhalsa Bai Sahib Holkar (known as Rukhma Bai, who died of cholera in Indore in June 1848). After her death, he married Maharani Shrimant Akhand Soubhagyavati Bhagirathi Bai Sahib Holkar and Maharani Shrimant Akhand Soubhagyavati Radha Bai Sahib Holkar. In the Indian Rebellion of 1857, Indore State stayed loyal to the British side.

== Death ==
Tukoji rao Holkar II died at Maheshwar on 17 June 1886 and was succeeded by his eldest surviving son Shivajirao Holkar, born in 1859 (the first two sons had died in 1854 and 1857).

== See also ==
- Holkar

Tukojirao Holkar II Holkar Dynasty Born: 3 May 1835 Died: 17 June 1886
Regnal titles
| Preceded by Khande Rao Holkar II | Maharaja Holkar of Indore; 1844 - 1886 | Succeeded by Shivaji Rao Holkar |
