= Hari Rao Holkar =

Maharaja of Indore from 1834 to 1843

- Maharaja (Ruler of Indore)
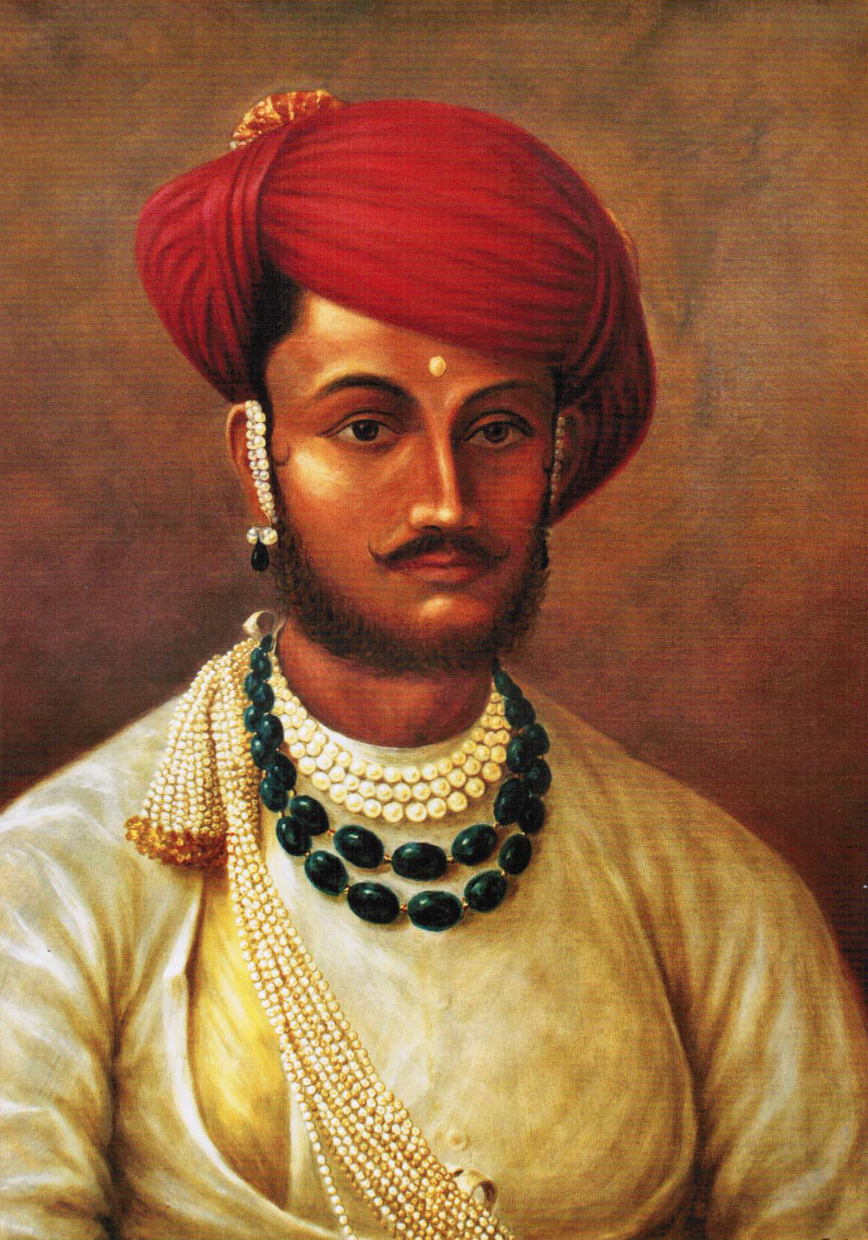
- Hari Rao Holkar

9th Holkar Maharaja of Indore
- Reign: 1834–1843
- Predecessor: Marthand Rao Holkar
- Successor: Khande Rao Holkar II
- Born: 1795
- Died: 24 October 1843 (aged 47–48)
- Father: Vithoji Rao Holkar
- Religion: Hinduism

Hari Rao Holkar (1795–1843), formally Maharajadhiraj Raj Rajeshwar Sawai Shri Hari Rao Holkar IX Bahadur, belonging to the Holkar dynasty of the Marathas was Maharaja Holkar of Indore (Hokar State) from 17 April 1834 until his death at the Juna Rajwada Palace in Indore on 24 October 1843. He was the grandson of Tukoji Rao Holkar.

== Life ==
Hari Rao's accession to the throne (gaddi) was the result of a popular uprising against the adoption and crowning of the child Marthand Rao Holkar by Krishna Bai Holkar, the mother of the deceased Maharaja Malhar Rao Holkar III. In 1819, Hari Rao was involved in a power struggle with members of the royal family and was imprisoned at Maheshwar for leading an insurrection. After the crowning of Marthand Rao in January 1834, Hari was freed by supporters, who then convinced Krishna Bai to agree to his succession instead. He was subsequently adopted by the widow of the deceased Maharaja on 18 March and formally installed on the throne on 17 April 1834 at the Juna Rajwada Palace.

The British Government remained neutral regarding these succession struggles. Later, however, as Hari Rao's health deteriorated, the British Resident pressed him to appoint an heir. On 2 July 1841, Hari Rao adopted Khande Rao Holkar, the 11-year-old son of Bapuji Rao Holkar, a zemindar of Jotsikhera (near Indore). Soon after, when Hari Rao retired from public life due to his health, Lord Ellenborough, the Governor General, interceded to ensure the appointment of capable ministers to prevent supporters of Marthand Rao from challenging the succession.

== See also ==
- Holkar

== Bibliography ==
- Singh, Narayan (1971). Madhya Pradesh District Gazetteers: Indore. Department of District Gazetteers. p. 81.

Hari Rao Holkar Holkar Dynasty Born: 1795 Died: 24 October 1843
Regnal titles
Preceded by Marthand Rao Holkar	Maharaja of Indore; 1834–1843	Succeeded by Khande Rao Holkar II
