= Tulsi Bai Holkar =

Queen of Indore (1788–1817)

Maharani Tulsi Bai Holkar (c. 1788 – 20 December 1817) was a queen of Indore by marriage to Maharaja Yashwant Rao Holkar, and regent of the Indore State for her stepson Malhar Rao Holkar II between November 1811 and 20 December 1817.

== Biography ==
She was a daughter of Ajiba, a priest of the Mahanubhav sect (महानुभाव पंथ). She became one of the consorts of Yashwant Rao Holkar. Her spouse became king in 1806.

Tulsi Bai did not have any children. After the death of Yashwantrao Holkar in 1811, Tulsi bai became regent for 4 year old Malhar Rao Holkar II, son of Yashwantrao from another of his wife.

When she was on the way to join Baji Rao Peshwa to fight against the British, General John Malcolm arrived near Mahidpur and started negotiations. Tulsi Bai was in favor of British terms, but some Generals of her army refused. Tulsi Bai was not much in command of the army. Tension escalated and in the morning of 20 December 1817, her own soldiers beheaded her on the banks of the Shipra River near Mahidpur, and her body was thrown in the river.
