= Indore Residency =

Historical political office in India

Indore was one of the residencies of British India. Indore Residency included most of Indore State, and, after 1933, Rewa State, which formerly belonged to Bagelkhand Agency. It was part of Central India Agency.

== British Residents ==
List of British Residents of the Indore Residency.

- 1840–1844: Sir Claude Martin Wade (b. 1794 – d. 1861)
- 1845–1859: Robert North Collie Hamilton: (b. 1802 – d. 1887)
- 1859–1861: Sir Richmond Campbell Shakespear (b. 1812 - d. 1861)
- 1861–1869: Richard John Meade (b. 1821 – d. 1899)
- 1869–1881: Henry D. Daly
- 1881–1888: Henry Lepel-Griffin (b. 1838 – d. 1908)
- 1888–1890: P.F. Henvey
- 1890–1894: R.J. Crosthwaite
- 1894–1899: David W.K. Barr
- 1899–1902: Robert Henry Jennings
- 1902–1903: Francis Younghusband (b. 1863 – d. 1942)
- 1903–1907: Oswald Vivian Bosanquet (1st time) (b. 1866 – d. 1933)
- 1907–1909: James Levett Kaye (b. 1861 – d. 1917)
- 1909–1910: Charles Beckford Luard
- 1910–1916: Charles Lennox Russell
- 1916–1919: Oswald Vivian Bosanquet (2nd time) (s.a.)
- 1919?–1921: Francis Granville Beville
- 1921–1924: Denys Brooke Blakeway (b. 1870 – d. 1933)
- 1924–1929: Sir Reginald Glancy
- March 1927 – October 1927: Edward Herbert Kealy (acting for Glancy)
- 1929–1930: H. R. N. Pritchard
- 1930–1931: Frederick Bailey
- 1931–1932: G.M. Ogilvie
- 1933 – 21 March 1935: Rawdon James MacNabb (b. 1883 – d. 1935)
- 1935–1940: Kenneth Samuel Fitze (b. 1887 – d. 1960)
- 1940–1942: Gerald Thomas Fisher
- 1942–1946: Walter F. Campbell
- 1946–1947: Henry Mortimer Poulton (b. 1898 – d. 1973)
