= Khande Rao Holkar =

Maharaja of Indore from 1799 to 1807

- Maharaja (Ruler of Indore)
- Reign: 1799–1807
- Successor: Yashwant Rao Holkar
- Born: 1798
- Died: 22 February 1807 (aged 8 or 9)
- Father: Malhar Rao II Holkar
- Religion: Hinduism

Shrimant Sardar Khande Rao Holkar Subedar Bahadur (1798 - 22 February 1807), belonging to the Holkar dynasty of the Marathas was the Maharaja of Indore (r. 1799 - 1806). He was born in Poona in 1798, as posthumous son of Malhar Rao II Holkar.

He died from cholera at Shahpur, near Kotah on 22 February 1807.

== See also ==
- Holkar

Khande Rao Holkar Holkar Dynasty Born: 1798 Died: 22 February 1807
Regnal titles
Preceded by Kashi Rao Holkar	Maharaja of Indore; 1799 – 1807	Succeeded by Yashwant Rao Holkar
