= Marthand Rao Holkar =

Maharaja of Indore from 1833 to 1834

- Maharaja (Ruler of Indore)
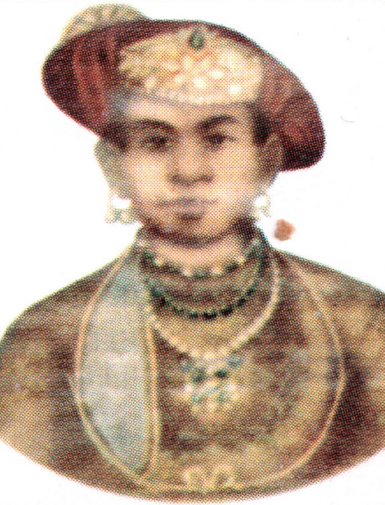
- Marthand Rao Holkar

8th Holkar Maharaja of Indore
- Reign: 1833–1834
- Coronation: 17 January 1834, Indore
- Predecessor: Malhar Rao Holkar III
- Successor: Hari Rao Holkar
- Born: 1830
- Died: 2 June 1849 (aged 18–19); Pune
Names
- Marthand Rao Holkar
- Father: Bapu Sahib Holkar
- Religion: Hinduism

Maharajadhiraj Raja Rajeshwar Sawai Shri Marthand Rao Holkar VIII Bahadur or Marthand Rao Holkar (1830–1849) belonging to the Holkar dynasty of the Marathas was briefly the Maharaja of Indore (Holkar State) (1833–1834).

He was born in 1830, the eldest son of Shrimant Sardar Bapu Sahib Holkar. He was adopted in October 1833 by Gautamabai Holkar and Krishna Bai Holkar, who were, respectively, the widow and mother of the deceased Maharaja Malhar Rao Holkar III.

== Gaddi ==
Marthand Rao was installed on the throne (gaddi) at Indore on 17 January 1834. The adoption, however, was not acceptable to the people, who regarded it as Gautama Bai's device for retaining power. The strong opposition of the public on 2 February 1834, led to the succession of Hari Rao Holkar. Subsequently, Marthand Rao was sent to the Deccan Plateau, where he was confined until his death at Poona on 2 June 1849.

== See also ==
- Holkar

Marthand Rao Holkar Holkar Dynasty Born: 1830 Died: 2 June 1849
Regnal titles
Preceded by Malhar Rao Holkar III	Maharaja of Indore; 1833–1834	Succeeded by Hari Rao Holkar
