= Indore State =

Historical principality in India (1731-1948)

State of Indore Indūra rājya (Marathi)
- 1732–1948
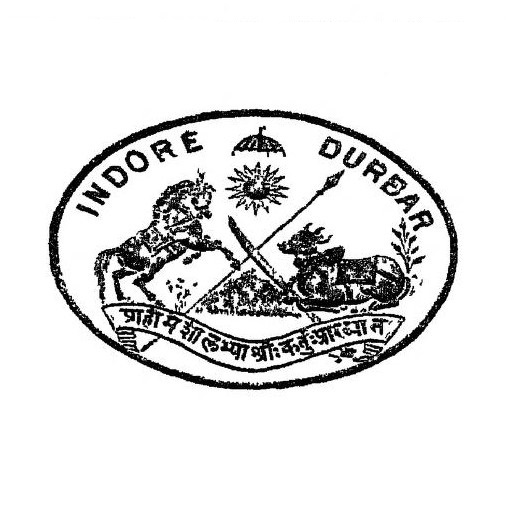
- Top: Flag (1732–1818); Bottom: Flag (1818–1950) Coat of arms

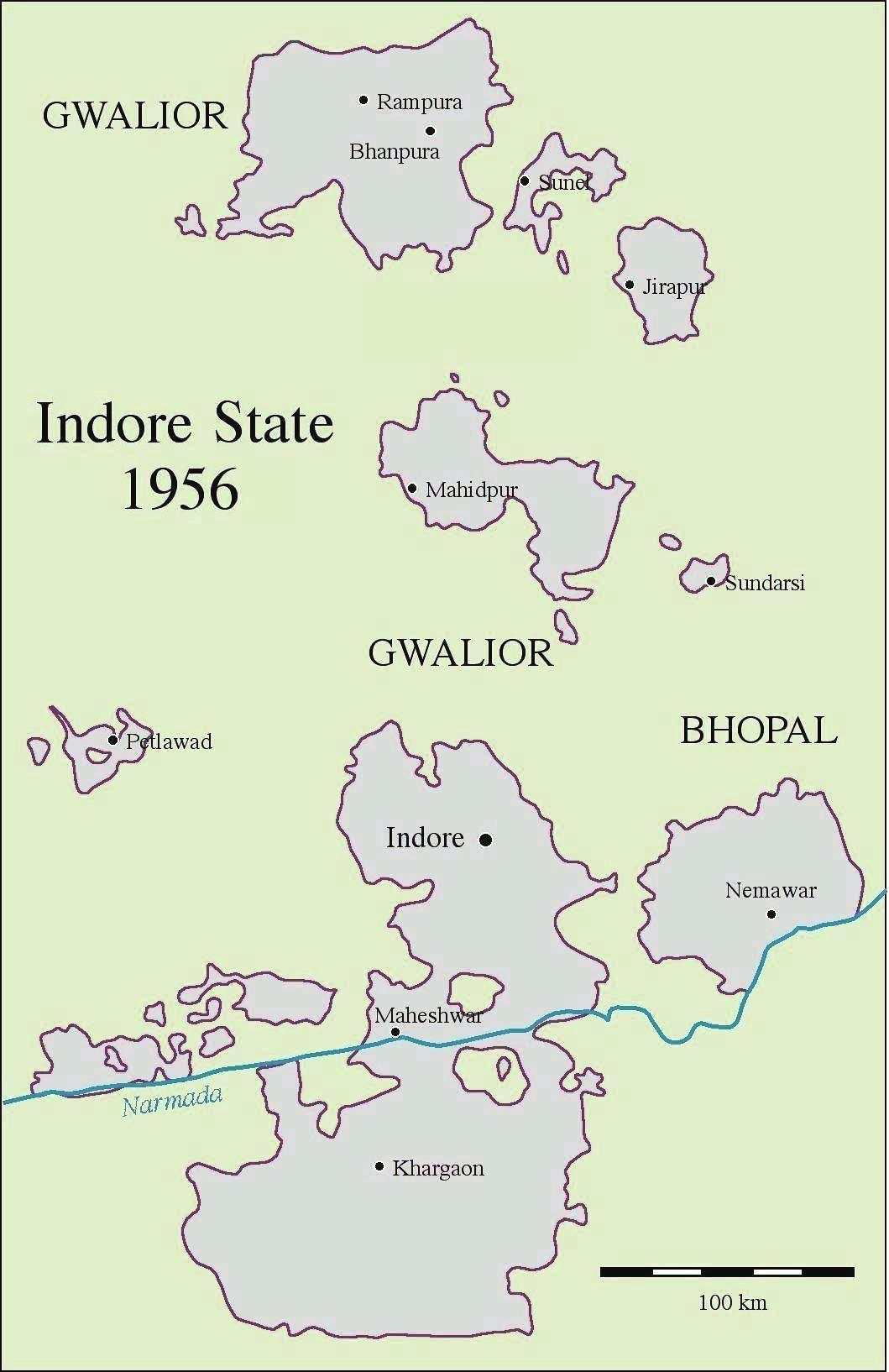
- Map of the territories of Indore State, some forming enclaves in neighbouring Gwalior and Bhopal states
- Status: State Within the Maratha Empire (1731–1818); Protectorate of the East India Company (1818–1857); Princely State of the British Raj (1857–1947); State of the Dominion of India (1947–1948)
- Capital: Indore
- Maharaja
  - 1732–1766 (first): Malhar Rao Holkar
  - 1926–1948 (last): Yashwant Rao Holkar II
- History
  - Established: 29 July 1732
  - Accession to Dominion of India: 1 January 1948

Area
- 1931: 25,646 km^{2} (9,902 sq mi)

Population
  - 1931: 1,325,089
Preceded by	Succeeded by
Maratha Confederacy	Dominion of India
- Today part of: India ∟ Madhya Pradesh

Indore State was a kingdom within the Maratha Empire ruled by the Maratha Holkar dynasty. After 1857, Indore became a 19-gun salute princely state within the Central India Agency of the Indian Empire under British protection.

Indore State was located in the present-day Indian state of Madhya Pradesh, with its capital at the city of Indore. The state had an area of 24,605 km^{2} and a population of 1,325,089 in 1931. Other important towns besides Indore were Rampura, Khargone, Maheshwar, Mehidpur, Barwaha, and Bhanpura; there were a total of 3,368 villages.

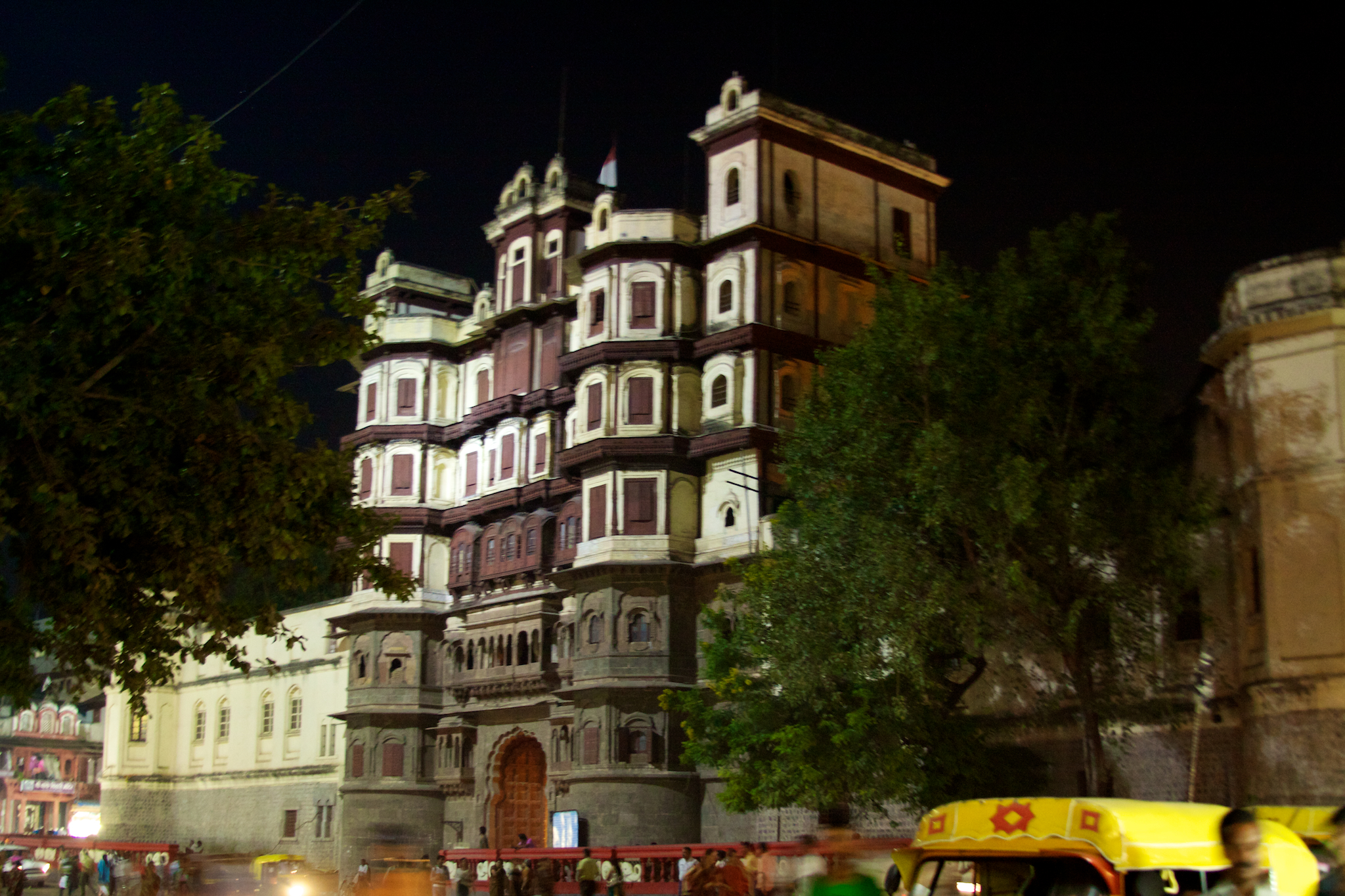
The Rajawada (Old Palace) of Indore

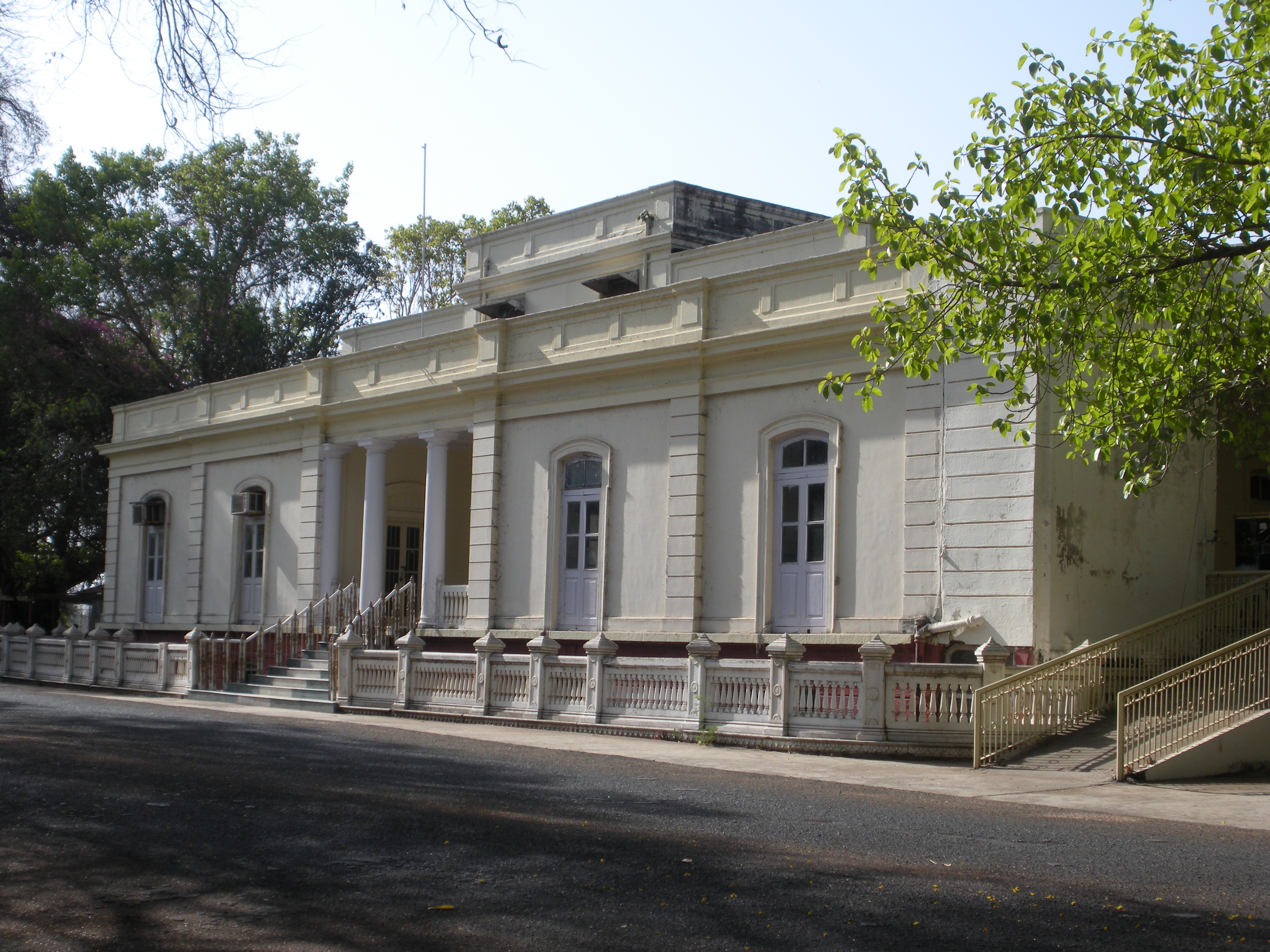
The Sukhnivas Palace

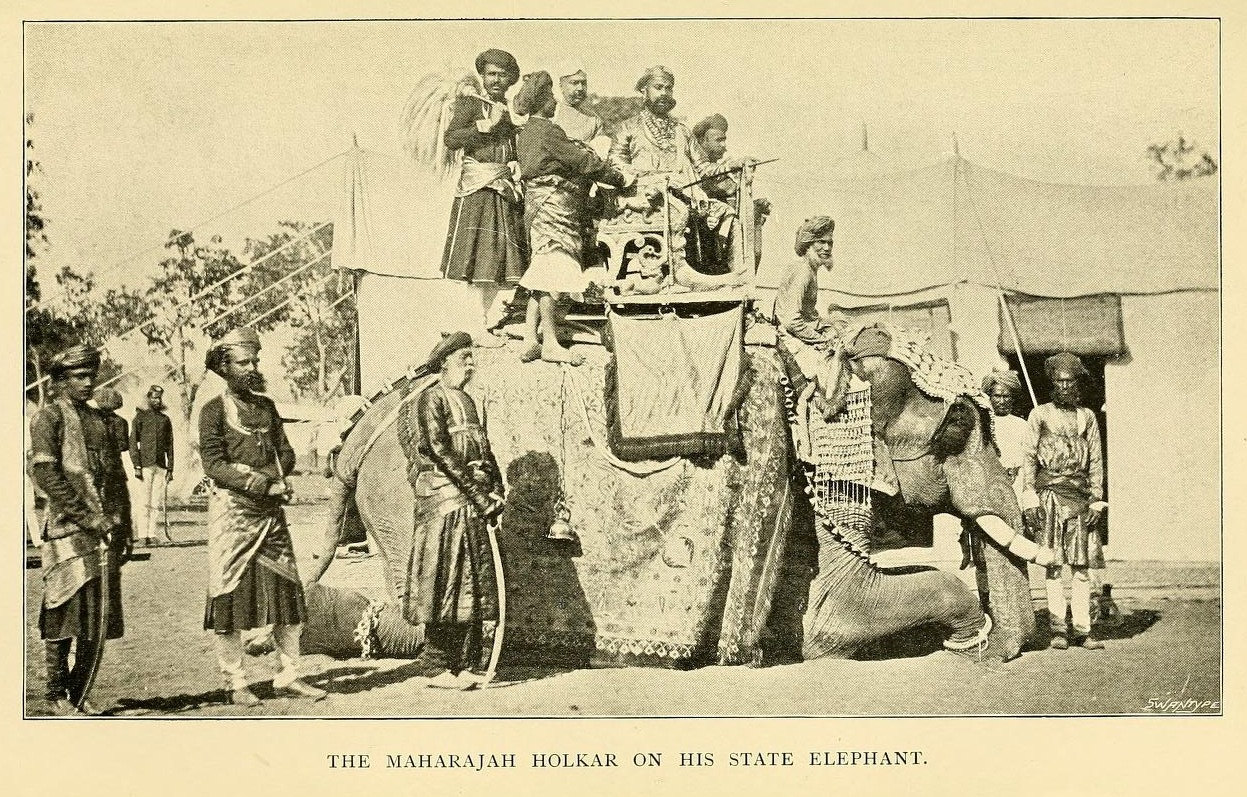
The Maharaja of Indore on his state elephant

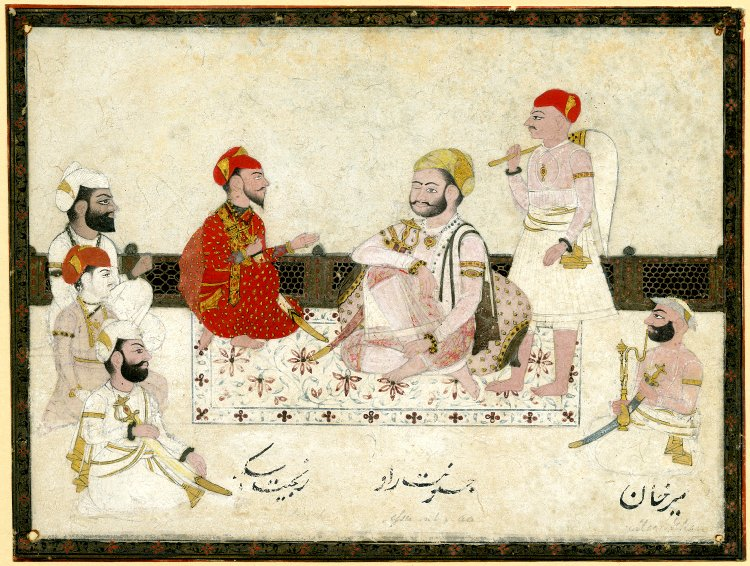
Yashwant Rao Holkar and Ranjit Singh in 1805

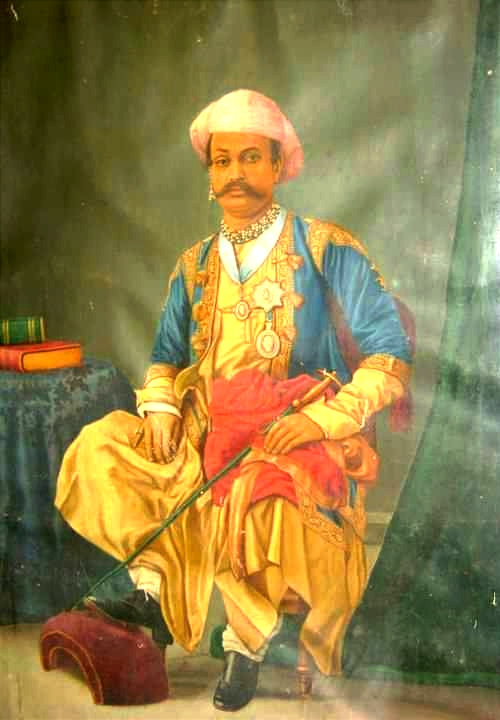
Sir Kashirao (Dada Saheb) Holkar, KCSI, KIH, Raja Of Indore.

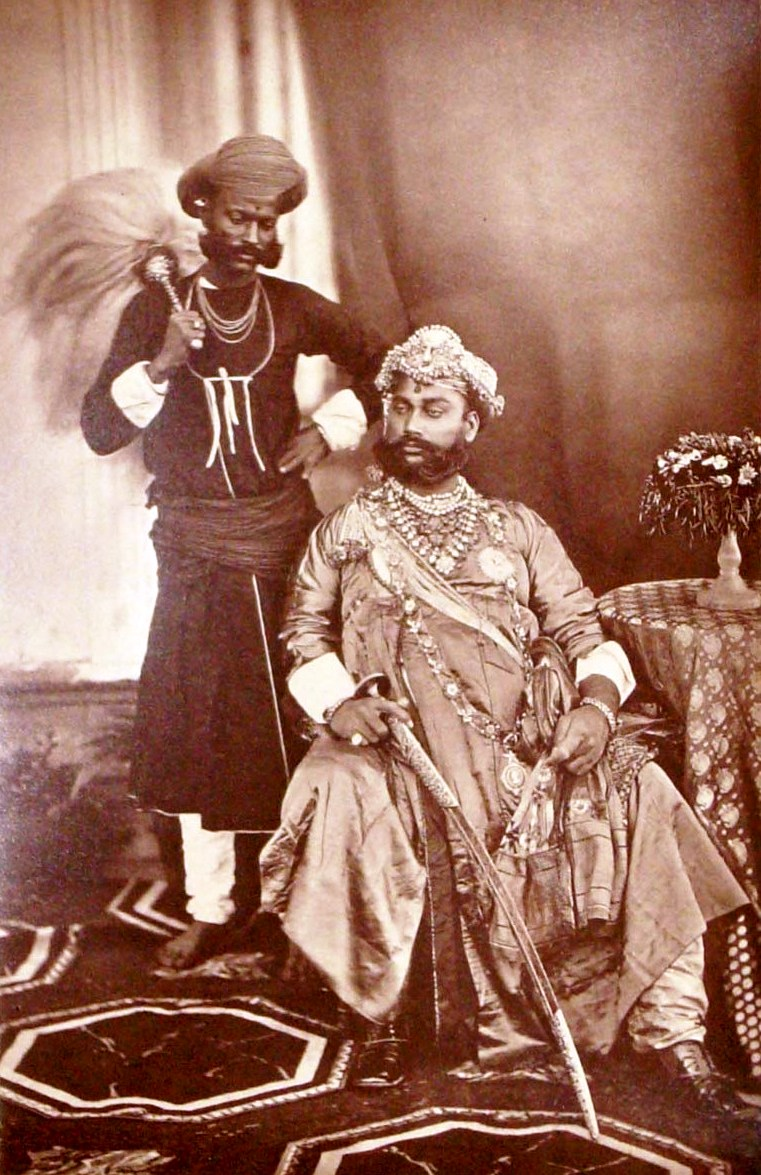
Maharaja Tukojirao Holkar II

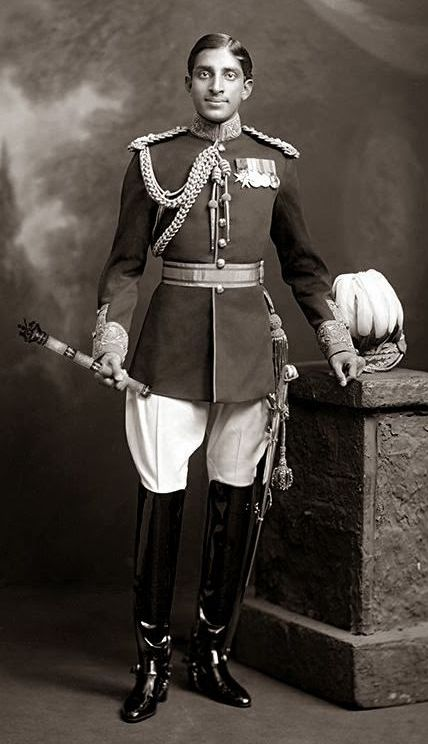
Tukojirao Holkar III, Maharaja of Indore

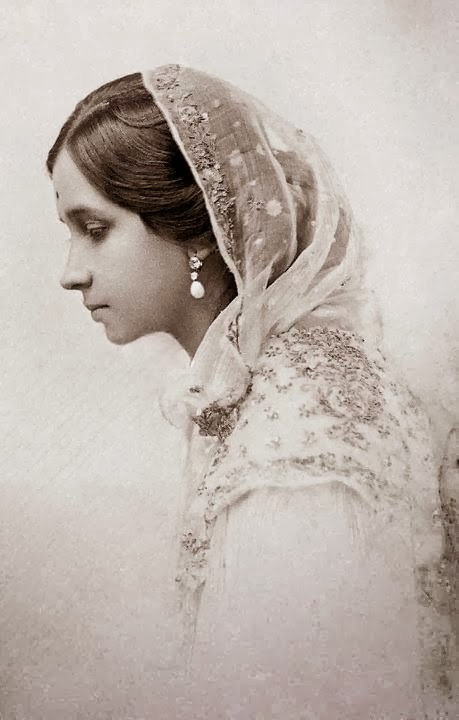
Maharani Shrimant Chandravati Bai Sahib Holkar, First Wife of Maharaja Tukojirao Holkar III of Indore

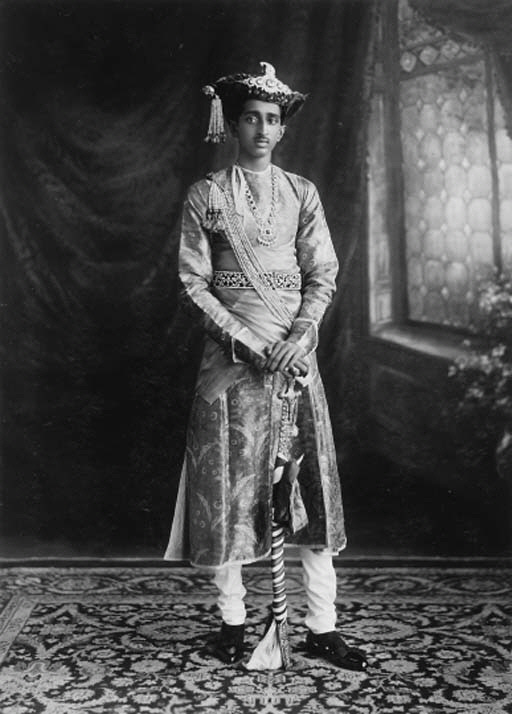
Yashwantrao Holkar II

== History ==
By 1720, the headquarters of the local pargana was transferred from Kampel to Indore due to the increasing commercial activity in the city. On 18 May 1724, the Nizam accepted the rights of the Maratha Peshwa Baji Rao I to collect chauth (taxes) from the area. In 1733, the Peshwa assumed full control of Malwa and appointed his commander Malhar Rao Holkar as the subahdar of the province.

On 29 July 1732, Bajirao Peshwa-I granted Holkar State by granting 28 and a half parganas to Malhar Rao Holkar, the founding ruler of the Holkar dynasty. His daughter-in-law Ahilyabai Holkar moved the state's capital to Maheshwar in 1767, but Indore remained an important commercial and military centre.

After the defeat of the Holkar rulers in the Third Anglo-Maratha War, an agreement was signed on 6 January 1818 with the British and the Indore State became a British protectorate. The Holkar dynasty was able to continue to rule Indore as a princely state mainly owing to the efforts of Dewan Tatya Jog.

The capital was moved from Maheshwar to Indore on 3 November 1818 and the Indore Residency, a political residency with a British resident, was established in the city. Later, Indore would be established as the headquarters of the British Central India Agency. In 1906, electrical infrastructure was installed in the city while a fire brigade was established in 1909. By 1918, the first master plan of the city was drawn by architect and town planner Patrick Geddes.

During the period of Maharaja Tukoji Rao Holkar II (1852–86), efforts were made for the planned development and industrial development of Indore. During the reigns of Maharaja Shivaji Rao Holkar, Maharaja Tukoji Rao Holkar III, and Maharaja Yeshwant Rao Holkar, business flourished thanks to the railways that had been introduced in the state in 1875.

In 1926, Maharaja Tukoji Rao III Holkar XIII abdicated after being implicated in a murder case involving a court dancer who had tried to escape from his harem.

After the independence of India in 1947, Indore State, along with a number of neighbouring princely states, acceded to India. Yashwant Rao Holkar II, the last ruler of the state, signed the instrument of accession to the Indian Union on 1 January 1950. The territories of the state became part of the new Indian state of Madhya Bharat.

== List of rulers ==
The kings of Indore held the title of 'Maharaja' Holkar. The rulers of the state were entitled to a 19 gun salute by the British authorities. The Holkar State Darbar (Court) was composed of many Jagirdars, Sardars, Istamuradars, Mankaris and Zamindars.

=== Maharajas ===
Name	Birth	Death	Reign
Malhar Rao Holkar I	1694	1766	1731 – 20 May 1766
Male Rao Holkar II	1745	1767	20 May 1766 – 5 April 1767
Ahilya Bai Holkar (III)(f), regent and then ruling queen	1725	1795	April 1767 – 13 August 1795
Tukoji Rao I Holkar IV	1723	1797	13 August 1795 – 29 January 1797 (also listed as co-ruler from April 1767)
Kashi Rao Holkar V	?	1808	29 January 1797 – January 1799
Khande Rao I Holkar VI	1798	1806	January 1799 – 1806
Yashwant Rao I Holkar	1776	1811	1806 – 27 October 1811 (regent from January 1799)
Malhar Rao III Holkar VII	1801	1833	November 1811 – 27 October 1833
Maharani Tulsi Bai (f), regent	?	1817	November 1811 – 20 December 1817
Martand Rao Holkar VIII	1830	1849	27 October 1833 – 2 February 1834
Hari Rao Holkar IX	1795	1843	2 February 1834 – 24 October 1843
Khande Rao II Holkar X	1828	1844	24 October 1843 – 17 February 1844
Maharani Maji (f), first regency	?	1849	24 October 1843 – 17 February 1844
Tukoji Rao II Holkar XI (knighted 25 June 1861)	1835	1886	27 June 1844 – 17 June 1886
Maharani Maji (f), second regency (s.a.)	?	1849	27 June 1844 – September 1849
Shivaji Rao Holkar XII (knighted 30 June 1887)	1859	1908	17 June 1886 – 31 January 1903
Tukoji Rao III Holkar XIII (knighted 1 January 1918)	1890	1978	31 January 1903 – 26 February 1926
Yashwant Rao II Holkar XIV (knighted 1 January 1935)	1908	1961	26 February 1926 – 15 August 1947
Usha Devi Holkar	1961	present	

=== Diwans of Indore ===
- c. 1808 – 1811: Bala Ram Seth
- 1811 – December 1817: Ganpal Rao
- 1818 – April 1826: Tantia Jog (Tatya Jog) (died 1826)
- April 1826 – 1827?: Raoji Trimbak
- 1827: Daji Bakhshi
- 1827? – 1829: Appa Rao Krishna
- 1829 – 1834?: Madhav Rao Phadnis
- April 1834 – November 1836: Sardar Revaji Rao Phanse
- 1836 – 1839?: Abbaji Ballal (or Bhawani Bin)
- 1839? – 1840?: Bhao Rao Phanse (1st time)
- 1840? – October 1841: Narayan Rao Palshikar
- 1841 – 1842?: the ruler
- 1842? – 1848: Bhao Rao Phanse (2nd time)
- 1848 – 1849: Ram Rao Palshikar
- 1852 – 1872: Bhawani Singh Dube
- 1872 – 1875: Sir T. Madhava Rao (1828–1891)
- 1875 – 1881: R. Raghunatha Rao (1st time) (1831–1912)
- 1881? – 1884?: Shahamat Ali
- 1884 – 1886: Nana Moroji Trilokekar
- 1886 – 1888: R. Raghunatha Rao (2nd time) (s.a.)
- c. 1890s: Balkrishna Atmaram Gupte
- 1890–1913: Sir Shri Rai Bhadhur Nanak Chand Ji Airen (as First Prime Minister Of State)
- 4 April 1913 – October 1914: Narayan Ganesh Chandravarkar
- 1914 – 1916: ....
- 1916 – 1921: Ram Prasad Dube (1st time. Nephew of Bhawani Singh Dube.)
- November 1921 – 1923?: Chettur Sankaran Nair (1857–1934)
- 1923 – 1926: Ram Prasad Dube (2nd time)

=== Prime ministers ===
• 1879 -1884: Bakshi Khuman Singh (C.S.I.)

- 1890–1913: Sir Shri Rai Bhadhur Nanak Chand Ji Airen
- February 1926 – 1939: Siremal Bapna (s.a.)
- 1939 – 1942?: Sardar Dina Nath
- 1942 – 1947: Raja Gyannath Madan
- 1947: R.G. Horton
- 1 September 1947 – 3 January 1948: E.P. Menon
- January 1948: N.C. Mehta
- 26 January 1948 – March 1948: M.V. Bhide

==== British Residents ====
British Residents of the Indore Residency.

- 1840–1844: Sir Claude Martin Wade (1794–1861)
- 1845–1859: Robert North Collie Hamilton (1802–1887)
- 1859–1861: Sir Richmond Campbell Shakespear (1812–1861)
- 1861–1869: Richard John Meade (1821–1899)
- 1869–1881: Henry D. Daly
- 1881–1888: Henry Lepel-Griffin (1838–1908)
- 1888–1890: P.F. Henvey
- 1890–1894: R.J. Crosthwaite
- 1894–1899: David W.K. Barr
- 1899–1902: Robert Henry Jennings
- 1902–1903: Francis Younghusband (1863–1942)
- 1903–1907: Oswald Vivian Bosanquet (1st time) (1866–1933)
- 1907–1909: James Levett Kaye (1861–1917)
- 1909–1910: Charles Beckford Luard
- 1910–1916: Charles Lennox Russell
- 1916–1919: Oswald Vivian Bosanquet (2nd time) (s.a.)
- 1919?–1921: Francis Granville Beville
- 1921–1924: Denys Brooke Blakeway (1870–1933)
- 1924–1929: Sir Reginald Glancy
- March 1927 – October 1927: Edward Herbert Kealy (acting for Glancy)
- 1929–1930: H.R.N. Pritchard
- 1930–1931: Frederick Bailey
- 1931–1932: G.M. Ogilvie
- 1933 – 21 March 1935: Rawdon James MacNabb (1883–1935)
- 1935–1940: Kenneth Samuel Fitze (1887–1960)
- 1940–1942: Gerald Thomas Fisher
- 1942–1946: Walter F. Campbell
- 1946–1947: Henry Mortimer Poulton (b. 1898 – d. 1973)

=== British Agents ===
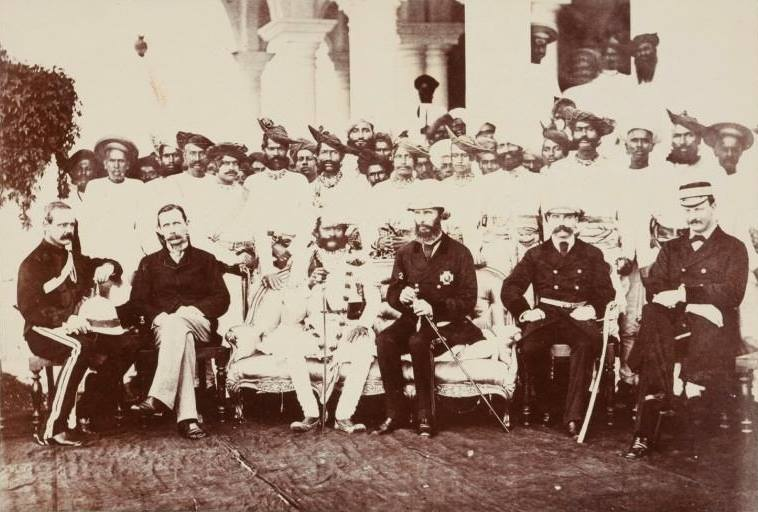
HH Maharaja Sir Jayaji Rao Scindia of Gwalior State, General Sir Henry Daly (Founder of The Daly College), with British officers and Maratha nobility (Sardars, Jagirdars & Mankaris) in Indore, Holkar State, c. 1879.

Agents to the Governor-General for the Central India Agency. The headquarters of the agent were at Indore.

- 1845–1854: Robert North Collie Hamilton (s.a.)
- 1854–1899: the British Residents in Indore
- 1899–1900: David W.K. Barr
- Mar 1900–1905: Charles S. Bayley
- 1905–1910: Hugh Daly
- 1910–1912: Michael Francis O'Dwyer (1864–1910)
- 1912–1913: John B. Wood
- 1913–1916: Oswald Vivian Bosanquet (s.a.)
- 1916–1944: the British Residents in Indore
- 1944–1946: Walter Campbell
- 1946–1947: Henry Mortimer Poulton (1898–1973)

== Orders of chivalry ==
The Royal House of Indore awards the Order of Ahilya Holkar Sultanat, which is awarded in three classes. It was founded on November 22, 1900 by Maharaja Sir Tukojirao III Holkar XIII.

== See also ==
- List of Maratha dynasties and states
- List of princely states of British India (by region)
- Maratha
- Political integration of India
- Maheshwar
- Rajwada
