= Shivajirao Holkar =

Maharaja of Indore from 1886 to 1903

Shivaji Rao
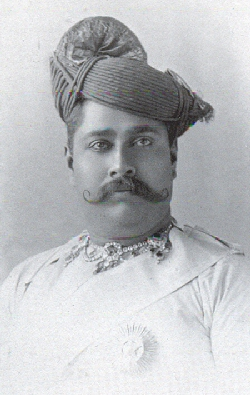

12th Holkar Maharaja of Indore
- Reign: 17 June 1886 – 31 January 1903
- Coronation: 12 July 1886, Indore
- Predecessor: Tukojirao Holkar II
- Successor: Tukojirao Holkar III
- Born: 11 November 1859; Indore, British Raj
- Died: 13 October 1908 (aged 48); Maheshwar, British Raj
- Issue: Tukojirao Holkar III Savitri bai, Bhima bai changan Thaku bai zannane
- House: Holkar
- Father: Tukojirao Holkar II

Maharajadhiraja Raj Rajeshwar Sawai Shri Sir Shivaji Rao Holkar Bahadur XII (Indore, 11 November 1859 – Maheshwar, 13 October 1908) was the Maharaja of Indore (Holkar State) in British India from 1886 until he abdicated in 1903. He belonged to the Holkar dynasty of the Marathas.

== Life ==
He was the son of Tukojirao Holkar II and Maharani Shrimant Akhand Soubhagyavati Parvati Bai Sahib. He was educated at the Daly College, Indore, a school in central India along with the rulers of the Ratlam State, Dewas State (senior) & other Thakurs of the princely states of the Central India Agency.

He succeeded his father when he died on 17 June 1886. He visited England in 1887 to attend the celebrations of Victoria's Golden Jubilee, and was made Knight Grand Commander of the Order of the Star of India on 20 June 1887.

His administration was poor. The resident had been separately removed from Indore since 1854, but since 1899 the British appointed a new resident specifically for better oversight of the state. The currency of the state was replaced in 1902 by the currency of British India.

He was in poor health, and apparently had indicated a desire to abdicate several times before he formally said so to the Viceroy, Lord Curzon in August 1902, delaying the actual ceremony until after the 1903 Delhi Durbar. He abdicated on 31 January 1903 in favour of his 12-year old son Tukojirao Holkar III, and retired to Barwaha.

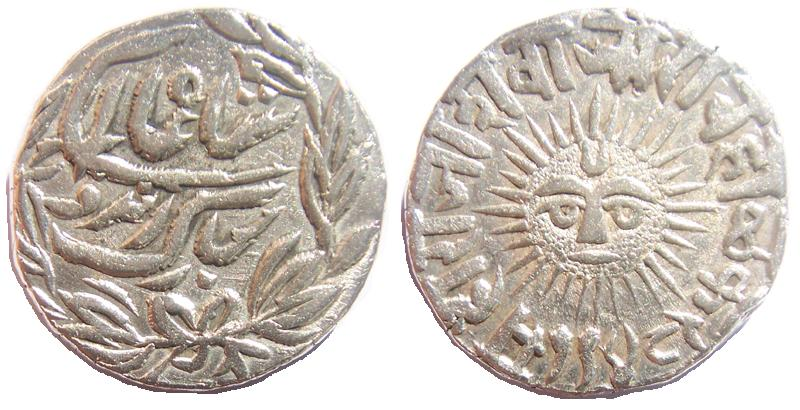
A silver rupee of Shivajirao Holkar 1886-1903, minted at Indore in Vikram Samvat 1948 (1891)

In 1865 he married Maharani Shrimant Akhand Soubhagyavati Girja Bai Sahib Holkar, later Maharani Shrimant Akhand Soubhagyavati Varanasi Bai Sahib Holkar, Shrimant Maharani Sahib Akhand Soubhagyavati Chandrabhaga Bai Holkar, Maharani Sita Bai Soubhagyavati Shrimant Akhand Sahib Holkar.

He died at Maheshwar on 13 October 1908. He had two sons and six daughters.

== Honours ==
- Knight Grand Commander of the Order of the Indian Empire (GCIE), 1887
- Queen Victoria Golden Jubilee Medal, 1887

== See also ==
- Holkar

Shivajirao Holkar Holkar Dynasty Born: 11 November 1859 Died: 13 October 1908
Regnal titles
Preceded by Tukojirao Holkar II	Maharaja Holkar of Indore; 1886 - 1903	Succeeded by Tukojirao Holkar III
