= Vithoji Rao Holkar =

Holkar noble

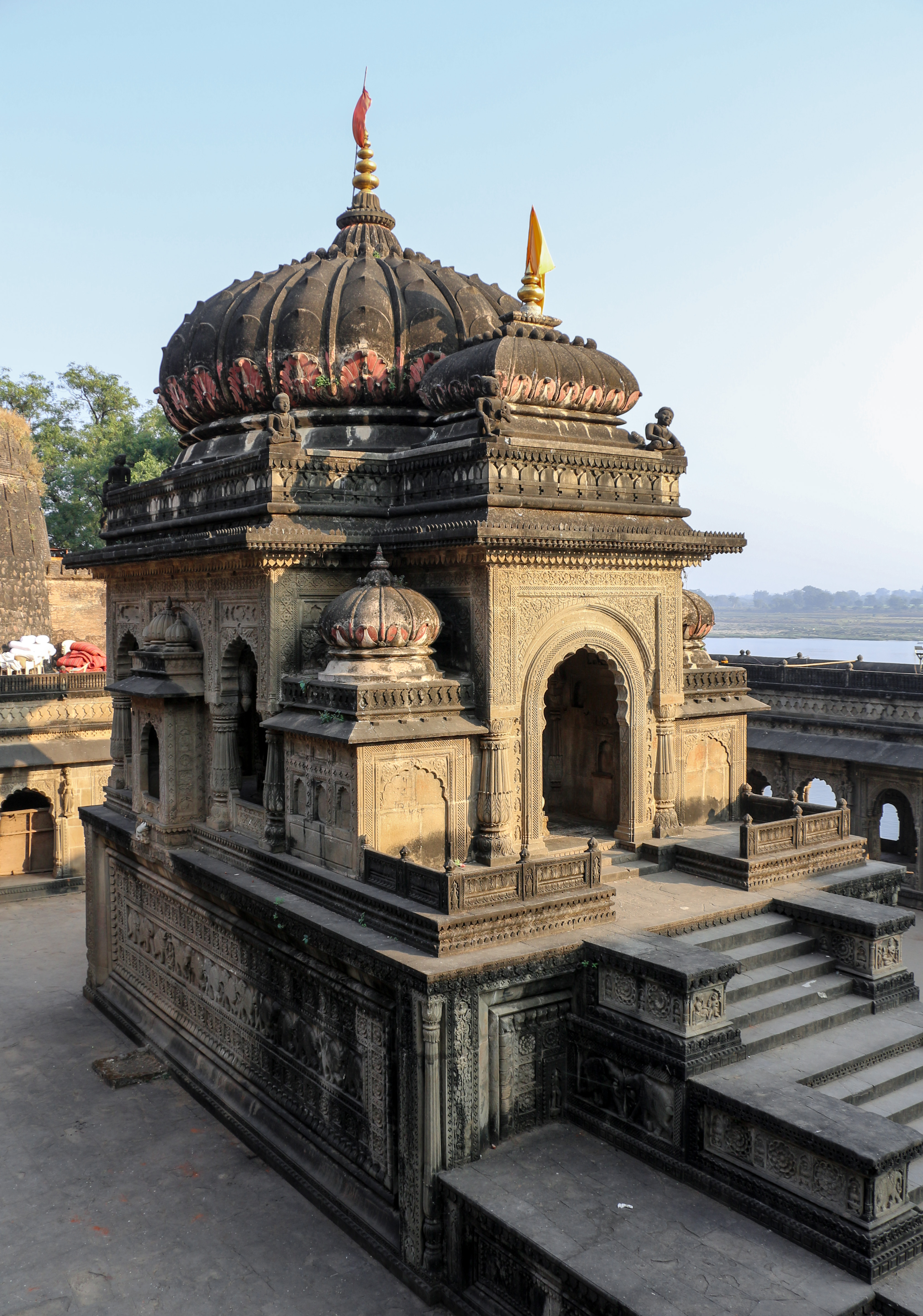
Chhatri of Vithoji in Maheshwar

Shrimant Sardar Vithoji Rao Holkar (1776 – 16 April 1801), was the fourth son of Sardar Tukoji Rao Holkar. He was also known as Vithoba.

== Life ==
Vithoji was born into the Holkar clan which was in the service of the Maratha Empire. When his elder brother Malhar Rao II Holkar was killed by the Scindia in September 1797, Vithoji escaped from Poona to Kolhapur.

To acquire more resources, Yashwant Rao Holkar started a freebooting campaign in the north, while Vithoji started a campaign of plunder and rapine in the south. He plundered the Peshwa's territories. Baji Rao II sent Balaji Kunjir and Bapu Gokhale to arrest Vithoji. In April 1801, Vithoji was arrested and taken to Pune.

On the advice of Balaji Kunjar, Vithoji was sentenced to death by being trampled under the feet of an elephant. His sentence was carried out on orders of the Peshwa Baji Rao II, at Poona on 16 April 1801: he was bound to an elephant's foot and dragged to death in the streets of the city. This caused animosity between Baji Rao II and Yashwant Rao. He was survived by Hari Rao Holkar who ruled the Holkar from 1834.

== Bibliography ==
- Forrest, George W., ed. (1885). Selections from the Letters, Despatches, and Other State Papers preserved in the Bombay Secretariat. Vol. 1. Part 1. Bombay: Government Central Press.
- Gazetteer of the Bombay Presidency (1885). Vol. 18. Part 2. Bombay: Government Central Press.
- Gazetteer of the Bombay Presidency (1885). Vol. 18. Part 3. Bombay: Government Central Press.

== See also ==
- Holkar
