= Kashi Rao Holkar =

Maharaja of Indore from 1797 to 1799

- Maharaja
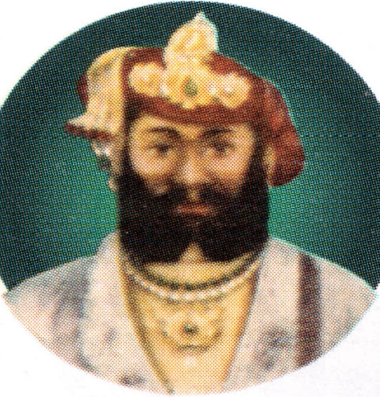
- Kashi Rao Holkar

Maharaja of Indore
- Reign: 15 August 1797 – 6 January 1799
- Predecessor: Tukoji Rao Holkar
- Successor: Yashwant Rao Holkar
- Born: before April 1767
- Died: 1808
- Father: Tukoji Rao Holkar
- Religion: Hinduism

Shrimant Sardar Kashi Rao Holkar V Subedar Bahadur (before April 1767 – 1808), belonging to the Holkar dynasty of the Marathas, was the Maharaja of Indore from 1797 to 1799. He was the eldest son of Shrimant Sardar Tukoji Rao Holkar, from his first wife.

== Life ==
The death of Tukoji Rao proved disastrous to the interests of the Holkars, as it marked the commencement of a period of prolonged strife between his four sons Kashi Rao Holkar, Malhar Rao II Holkar, Yashwant Rao Holkar and Vithoji Rao Holkar. But for securing the gaddi of the Holkars, Tukoji left two sons, Kashi Rao and Malhar Rao II.

Tukoji Rao during his lifetime, residing in Pune, declared Kashi Rao as his successor but he was handicapped and adulterous and due to this reason, the public and the soldiers also did not like Kashi Rao and preferred Malhar Rao as a ruler. Since Malhar Rao had all the qualities of a good administrator and as a good military leader, Malhar Rao, Vitthoji Rao, and Yashwant Rao opposed Kashi Rao and demanded that Malhar Rao should be the leader of the Holkar dynasty succeeding Shreemant Tukoji Rao.

Kashi Rao was also a man of weak intellect. His brother Malhar Rao was cast in a different mould. He was a man of great activity and energy and was of a turbulent disposition. He had, in 1791–92, given great trouble by raiding and devastating lands belonging both to the Holkars and other neighboring chiefs. He was finally brought under control by a force under Rao Rao Appaji and Dudrenec. His father was very furious and in one letter complained to Ahilya Bai of his bad bringing up. Malcolm states that Ahilya Bai and Tukoji desired Kashi Rao and Malhar Rao to occupy positions similar to those occupied by themselves - Kashi Rao to be the administrative head of Maheshwar, and Malhar Rao to become the commander-in-chief of the troops. The correspondence in the State records, however, in no way bears out this contemplated arrangement; on the contrary, it shows concussively that after the death of Ahilya Bai, Tukoji was bent on securing the succession of Kashi Rao. There are numerous letters written by Tukoji to Kashi Rao, when his health began to decline, urging him to come to him so that his succession to the gaddi of the Holkars may be secured, upbringing him for his delay and asserting that he had obtained Scindia's support for him. In 1796, he appeared before his father and was formally invested with a khilat as his heir. Kashi Rao wrote to Ram Rao Appaji on Tuesday, 8 November 1796:

"My father has been very ill, and I came here by forced marches to visit him. He presented me with a dress of honour, recognizing me as his successor. This has enraged Malhar Rao so much that he has left our camp, and is halting close to the Peshwa. I do not know what his intentions are. Please take steps to watch his actions."

From the moment of their father's death Kashi Rao and Malhar Rao, the two brothers, commenced contending for the gaddi. Malhar Rao threw himself on the protection of the Peshwa, while Kashi Rao secured the support of Scindia through the instrumentality of the latter's Minister Sarje Rao Ghatke. A reconciliation was, however, effected between the two brothers on the pretext of avoiding a civil war, which was sworn to by the most solemn oaths.

When Kashi Rao felt that his authority was in danger, he sought the help of Daulat Rao Scindia of Gwalior who was considered jealous of the Holkars, due to the growing prominence and rising power of Holkars in North India. On 14 September 1797, Daulat Rao Scindia suddenly attacked Malhar Rao and killed him. His infant son fell into Scindia's hands, who at once put him into safe custody. Yashwant Rao and his brother Vithoji, however, escaped, the former to Nagpur and the latter to Kolhapur. Yashwantrao Holkar took shelter at Nagpur's Raghoji II Bhonsle. When Scindia learned this, he asked Raghoji II Bhonsle to arrest Yashwantrao Holkar. Yashwantrao was arrested on 20 February 1798. Bhawani Shankar Khatri, who was with Yashwantrao, helped him to escape, and both of them escaped from Nagpur on 6 April 1798.

The public support for Yashwant Rao Holkar was growing. Many courageous soldiers also joined the army of Yashwantrao Holkar. Anandrao Pawar the King of Dhar also helped Yashwant Rao since he was also proved helpful to Anandrao in curbing the rebellion of one of his ministers, Rangnath. Yashwant Rao Holkar defeated the army of Shevelier Duddres near Kasrawad and captured Maheshwar. In January 1799 Yashwant Rao was crowned King of the Holkar Dynasty as per Hindu Vedic rites and succeeded Kashirao from February 1799 as sixth ruler of the Holkar Kingdom.

== See also ==
- Holkar
