= Moreshwar =

Moreshwar is a given name. Notable people with the name include:

- Moreshwar Vasudeo Abhyankar (1886–1935), lawyer, freedom fighter
- Vishnupant Moreshwar Chatre (1840–1905), Indian circus owner
- Sharad Moreshwar Hardikar (born 1932), Indian orthopedic surgeon
- Vishnu Moreshwar Mahajani (1851–1923), Marathi poet and playwright in British India
- Hanumant Moreshwar Marathe (1940–2017), journalist and Marathi writer
- Moreshwar Ramji Paradkar (1729–1794), aka Moropant or Mayur Pandit, Marathi poet
- Kapil Moreshwar Patil (born 1961), politician from Bhiwandi in Maharashtra, India
- Lalji Moreshwar Pendse, Indian politician from Maharashtra
- Balwant Moreshwar Purandare (1922–2021), aka Babasaheb Purandare, Indian historian and writer
- Atul Moreshwar Save Indian politician
- Moreshwar Save (1931–2015), Indian politician
- Moreshwar Ramachandra Walambe (1912–1992), educator, grammarian of the Marathi language
