= Kampel, Indore =

Kampel
- village
- Location within Madhya Pradesh Location within India
- Coordinates: 22°37′N 76°3′E
- Country: India
- State: Madhya Pradesh
- District: Indore
- Time zone: UTC+5.30 (IST)
- PIN: 452020
- STD: 0731
- ISO 3166 code: IN-MP

Kampel is a panchayat village in the Indore block of the Indore district, Madhya Pradesh, India. It was the headquarters of a pargana in Mughal Empire before the administrative center of the region was shifted to Indore city under the Holkars of the Maratha Empire.

== History ==
During the Mughal era, the area under the modern Indore district was equally divided between the administrations (sarkars) of Ujjain and Mandu. Kampel was the headquarters of a mahal (administrative unit) under the Ujjain sarkar of Malwa Subah (province). The area of the modern Indore city was included in the Kampel pargana (administrative unit).

In 1715, the Marathas invaded this region (Mughal territory) and demanded chauth (tax) from the Mughal Amil (administrator) of Kampel. The Amil fled to Ujjain, and the local zamindars agreed to pay Chauth to the Marathas. The chief zamindar, Nandlal Chaudhury (later known as Nandlal Mandloi), paid a chauth of around Rs. 25,000 to the Marathas. Jai Singh II, the Mughal Governor of Malwa, reached Kampel on 8 May 1715, and defeated the Marathas in a battle near the village. The Marathas came back in early 1716, and raided Kampel in 1717. In March 1718, the Marathas, led by Santaji Bhonsale, invaded Malwa again, but were unsuccessful this time.

By 1720, the headquarters of the local pargana were transferred from Kampel to Indore, due to the increasing commercial activity in the city. In 1724, the Marathas under the new Peshwa Baji Rao I, launched a fresh attack on the Mughals in Malwa. Baji Rao I himself led the campaign, accompanied by his lieutenants Udaji Rao Pawar, Malhar Rao Holkar and Ranoji Scindia. The Mughal Nizam met the Peshwa at Nalchha on 18 May 1724, and acceded to his demand of collecting chauth from the area. The Peshwa returned to the Deccan, but left Malhar Rao Holkar at Indore to oversee the chauth collection.

The Marathas maintained friendly relations with Nandlal Chaudhary, who held influence over the local Sardars (chiefs). In 1728, they defeated the Mughals decisively at Amjhera, and consolidated their authority in the area over the next few years. On 3 October 1730, Malhar Rao Holkar was appointed as the Maratha chief of Malwa. The local zamindars, who had the title of Chaudhari, came to be known as Mandlois (after mandal, an administrative unit) during the Maratha reign. The Holkar dynasty of the Marathas, which controlled the region, conferred the title of Rao Raja upon the local zamindar family. After Nandlal died, his son Tejkarana was accepted as the Mandloi of Kampel by the Peshwa Baji Rao I. The pargana was formally granted to Malhar Rao Holkar by merging 28 and one-half Pargana by the Peshwa in 1733. The pargana headquarters were transferred back to Kampel during his reign. After his death, his daughter-in-law Ahilyabai Holkar moved the headquarters to Indore in 1766. The tehsil of Kampel was converted into Indore tehsil by a change in the name. Ahilyabai Holkar moved the state's capital to Maheshwar in 1767, but Indore remained an important commercial and military center.

== See also ==
- Maratha Empire
- List of Maratha dynasties and states
- Holkar State
- Indore
