= Khande Rao Holkar II =

Maharaja of Indore from 1843 to 1844

- Maharaja (Ruler of Indore)
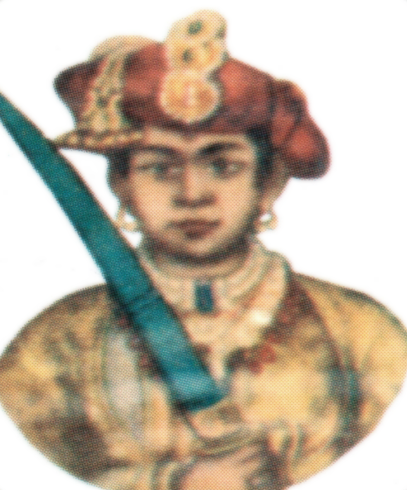
- Khande Rao Holkar II

10th Holkar Maharaja of Indore
- Reign: 13 November 1843 – 17 March 1844
- Predecessor: Hari Rao Holkar
- Successor: Tukoji Rao Holkar II
- Born: c. 1828
- Died: 17 March 1844 (aged 15 or 16)
- Father: Bapuji Rao Holkar
- Religion: Hinduism

H.H.Maharajadhiraj Raj Rajeshwar Sawai Shri Khande Rao II Holkar X Bahadur (c. 1828 – 17 March 1844), belonging to the Holkar dynasty of the Marathas was Maharaja of Indore (Hokar State) (r. 1843 – 1844). He was born at Jotsikhera in 1828, as the eldest son of Shrimant Sardar Bapuji Rao Holkar of Jotsikhera.

He was adopted by his cousin, Maharaja Hari Rao Holkar IX, 2 July 1841 (recognised by the Government of India, 30 August 1841), and succeeded on the death of his adopted father, 24 October 1843.

After the death of Hari Rao Holkar, his adopted successor Khande Rao was formally installed on 13 November 1843, and his succession was recognized by the British Government.

He reigned under the Regency of his adopted grandmother, Maharani Krishna Bai Holkar Maji Sahiba. Being weak in mind and body, he was entirely under the influence of his minister Raja Bhau Phanse.

He suddenly died on 17 March 1844, without having adopted a son and successor or assigning that responsibility to his widow or mother.

== See also ==
- Holkar

Khande Rao Holkar II Horkar Dynasty Born: 1828 Died: 17 March 1844
Regnal titles
Preceded by Hari Rao Holkar	Maharaja of Indore; 1843 – 1844	Succeeded by Tukoji Rao Holkar II
