= House of Holkar =

Indian dynasty of Indore (1731–1948)

Holkar Maharaja of Indore
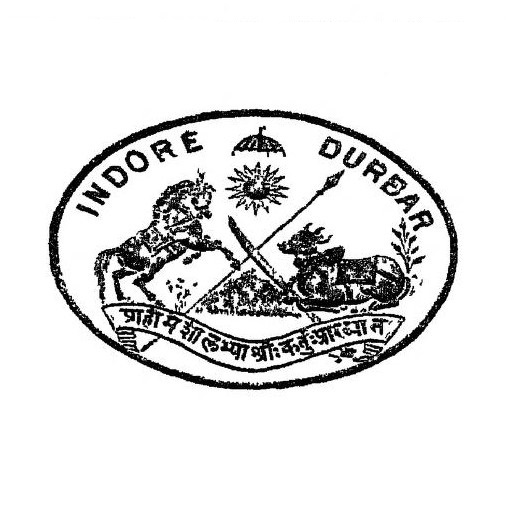
- Coat of arms of Indore State

- Flag of Indore

Details
- First monarch: Malhar Rao Holkar I
- Last monarch: Yashwantrao Holkar II
- Formed: 2 November 1731
- Abolished: 26 June 1948
- Residences: Rajwada, Indore

The Holkars (pronunciation: [ɦo(ː)ɭkəɾ]) were the ruling house of the Indore State of the Maratha Confederacy, and earlier held the rank of Subahdar under Peshwa Baji Rao I of the Maratha Empire. When the Maratha Confederacy began to weaken due to internal clashes, the Holkars declared themselves the rulers of Indore in Central India, existing as an autonomous member of the Maratha Confederacy until 1818. Later, their kingdom became a princely state under the British protection.

Usha Devi Holkar, 15th Maharani of Indore, is the current titular head.

== Rise of Holkar as Subahdar ==
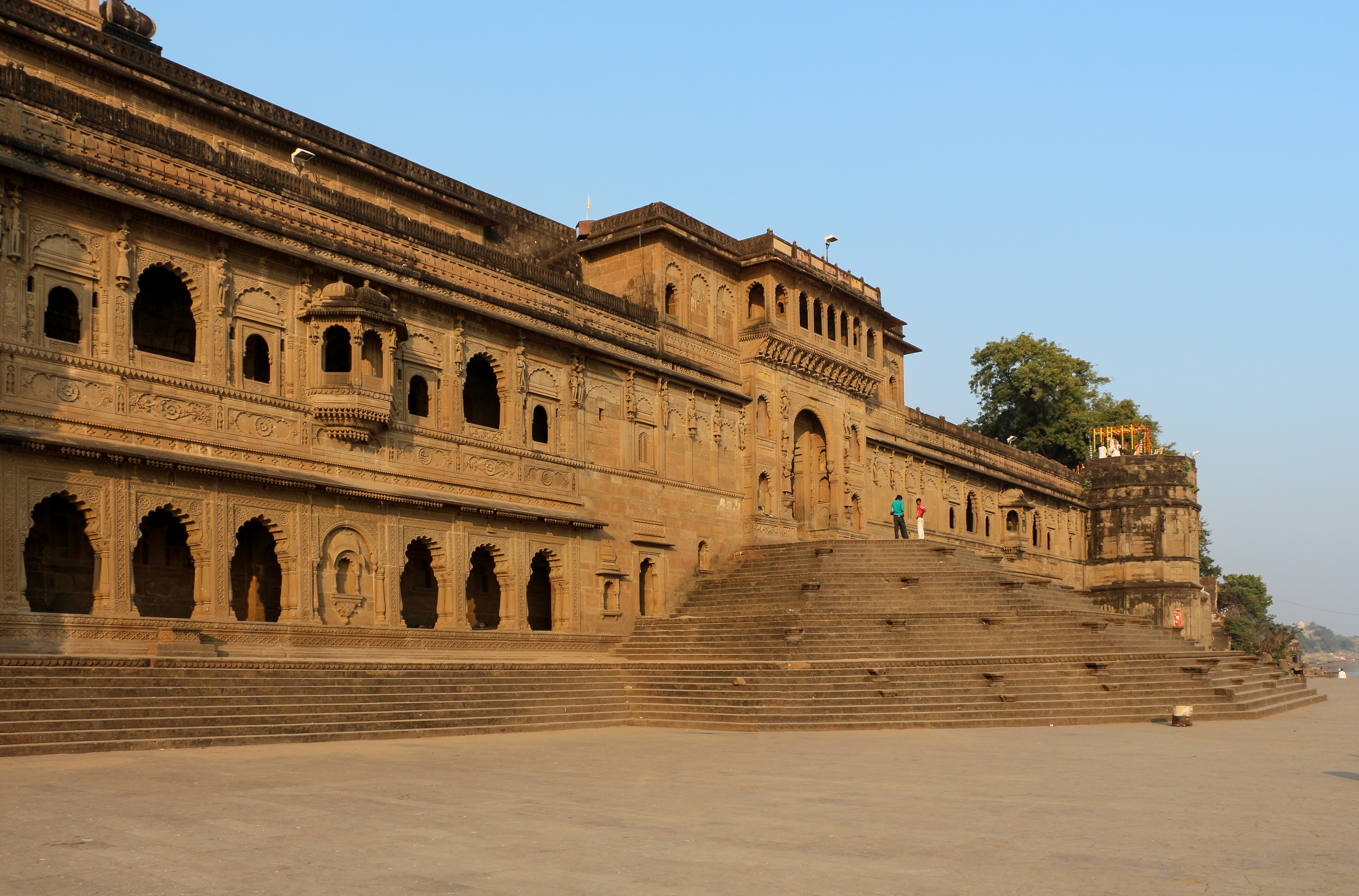
Fort Ahilya in Maheshwar

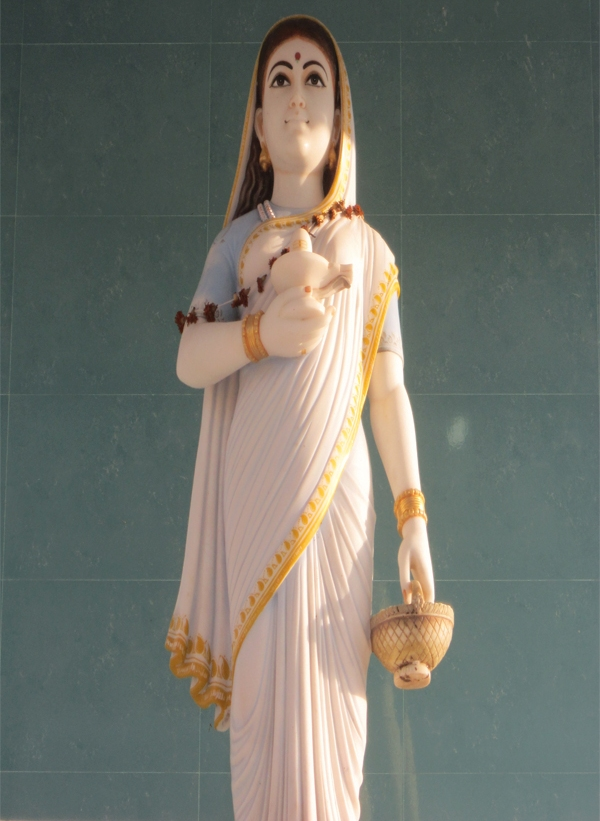
A Statue of Ahilyabai Holkar at Datta Temple

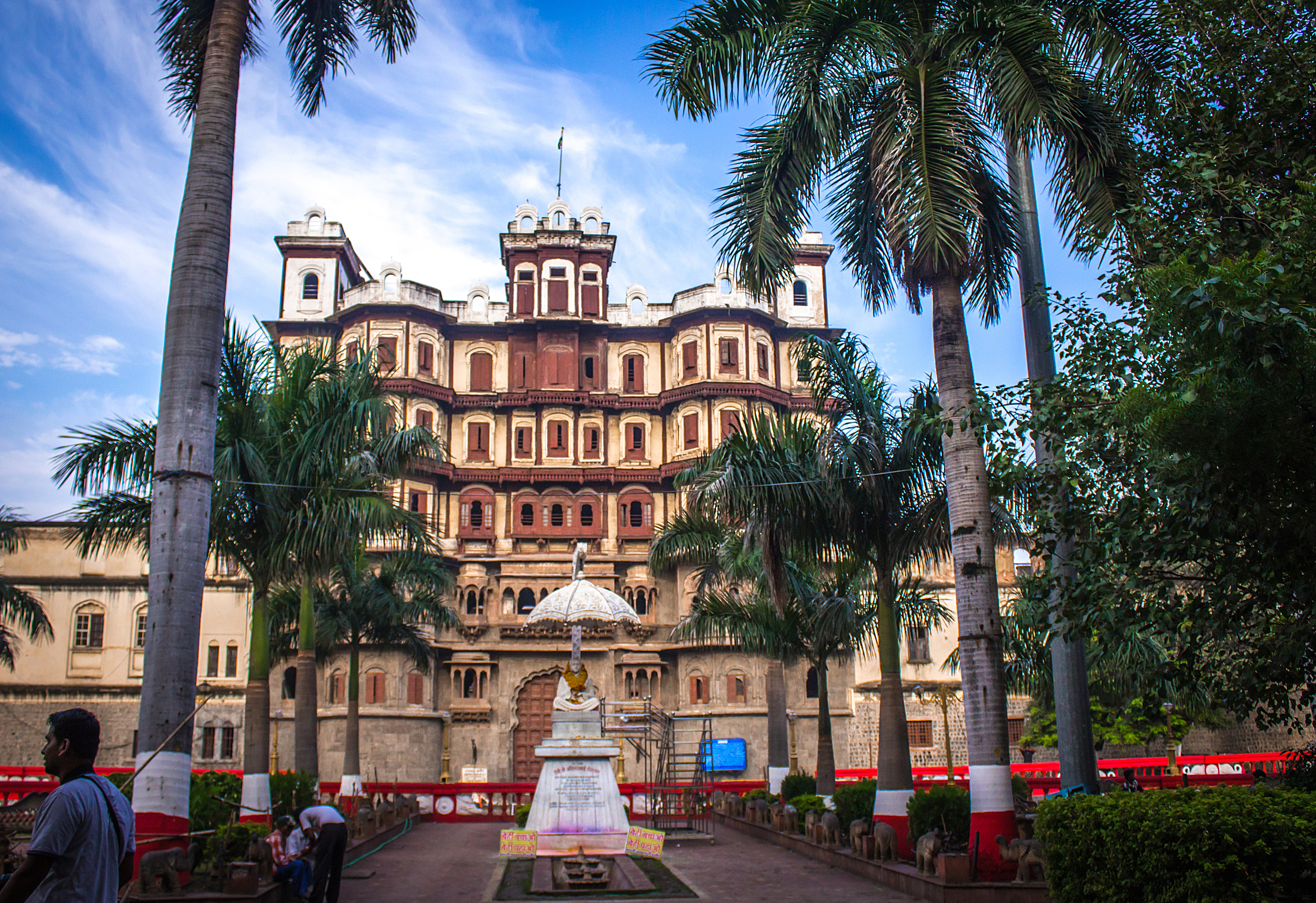
The gate of Rajwada, royal palace of the Holkar dynasty, Indore

The Holkars were of Dhangar Maratha origin.

Malhar Rao Holkar (1694–1766), was born in Murum in Satara district in a Dhangar family and was a Maratha chief serving under Bajirao I, was given the area of Indore to look after by Bajirao I, the Peshwa of Shahu I. In the 1720s, he led Maratha armies in the Malwa region under the Peshwa Bajirao, and in 1733 was granted 9 parganas in the vicinity of Indore by the Peshwas. The township of Indore already existed as an independent principality established by Nandlal Mandloi of Kampel. Nandlal Mandloi was won over by the Maratha forces and he allowed them to camp across the Khan River. In 1734, Malhar Rao established a camp later called Malharganj. In 1747, he began construction of his royal palace, the Rajwada. By the time of his death, he looked after much of Malwa for the Maratha Empire controlled by their lords Peshwas, and was acknowledged as one of the five houses of the Maratha Empire.

He was succeeded by Ahilyabai Holkar (r. 1767–1795), his daughter-in-law. She was born in the Chaundi village in Maharashtra. She moved the capital to Maheshwar, south of Indore on the Narmada River. Rani Ahilyabai was a prolific builder and patron of Hindu temples in Maheshwar and Indore. She also built temples at sacred sites outside her kingdom, from Dwarka in Gujarat east to the Kashi Vishwanath Temple at Varanasi on the Ganges.

The adopted son of Malhar Rao Holkar, Tukoji Rao Holkar (r. 1795–1797) briefly succeeded Rani Ahilyabai upon her death. Tukoji Rao had been a commander under Ahilyabai for her entire rule.

== The fall of the Maratha Empire ==
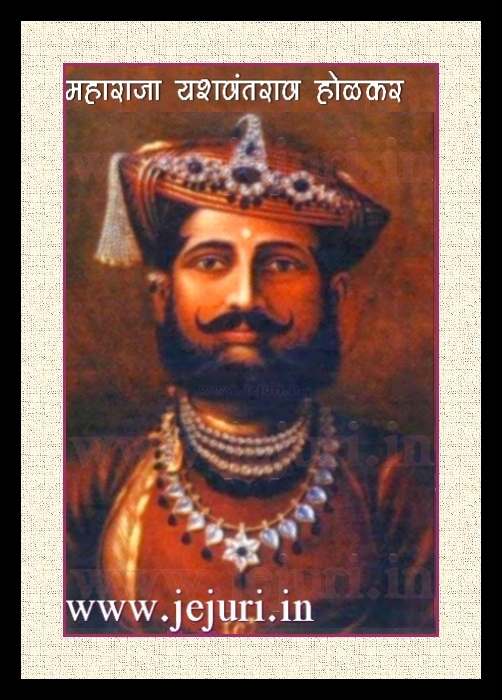
Yashwantrao Holkar.

His son Yashwantrao Holkar (r. 1797–1811) (also called as Jaswant Rao) succeeded Tukoji Rao Holkar upon his death. He tried to free the Delhi Mughal Emperor Shah Alam II from the British in the unsuccessful Second Anglo-Maratha War. The grateful Shah Alam gave him the title of Maharajadiraj Rajrajeshwar Alija Bahadur in honor of his bravery.

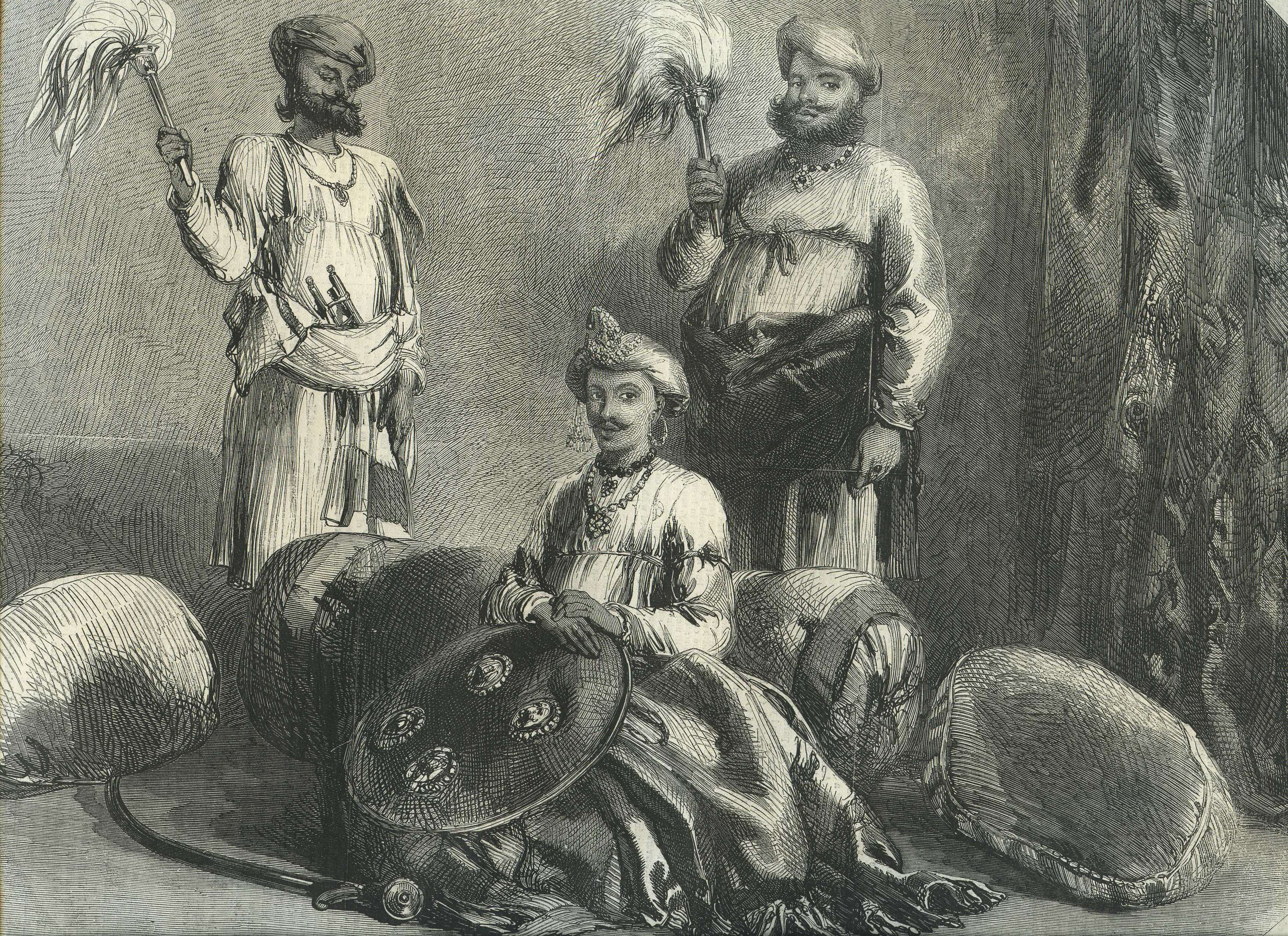
Tukojirao Holkar II, Indore, from a drawing by Mr. W. Carpenter, Jun.," from the Illustrated London News, 1857

Attempts by Yashwantrao Holkar to unite the kings failed, and he was approached to sign a peace treaty with the British. The Treaty of Rajghat, signed late December 1805, recognised him as a sovereign king.

== Battle of Mahidpur ==
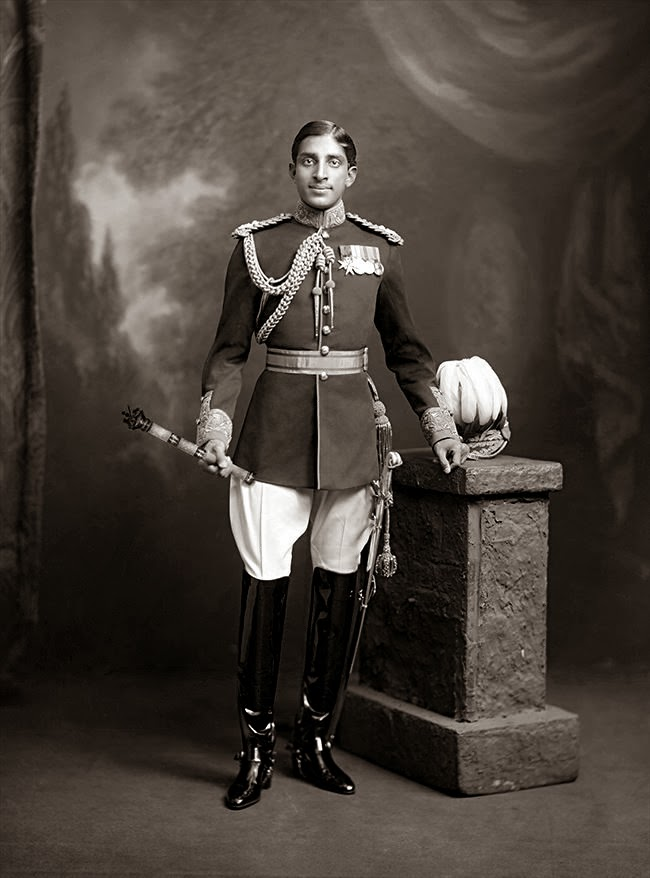
Tukojirao Holkar III Maharaja Holkar of Indore

In 1811, the four-year-old Malhar Rao Holkar III succeeded Yashwantrao Holkar. His mother, Tulsabai Holkar, looked after the administration. However, with the help of Pathans, Pindaris, and the British, Dharama Kunwar and Balaram Seth plotted to imprison Tulsabai and Malharrao. When Tulsabai learnt about this, she beheaded both of them in 1815 and appointed Tantia Jog. As a result, Gaffur Khan Pindari secretly signed a treaty with the British on 9 November 1817 and killed Tulsabai on 19 December 1817.

The treaty was signed on 6 January 1818 at Mandsaur. Bhimabai Holkar did not accept the treaty, and kept attacking the British by guerilla methods. Years later, in revolt of 1857, Rani Lakshmibai of Jhansi took inspiration from Bhimabai Holkar and also fought against the British. At the conclusion of the Third Anglo-Maratha War, the Holkars lost much of their territory to the British and were incorporated into the British Raj as a princely state of the Central India Agency. The capital was shifted from Bhanpura to Indore.

== Princely state ==
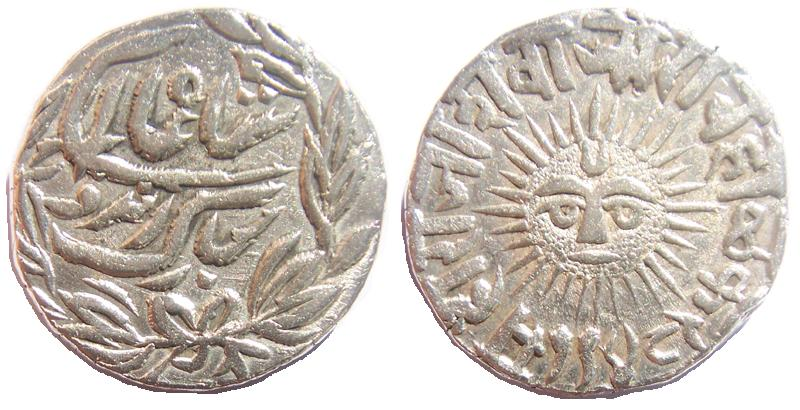
A silver rupee of Shivajirao Holkar 1886–1903, minted at Indore in Vikram Samvat 1948 (1891)

Malharrao Holkar III entered Indore on 2 November 1818. Tantia Jog was appointed his Diwan as he was a minor. As the old palace had been destroyed by the army of Daulat Rao Scindia, a new palace was constructed in its place. Malharrao III was succeeded by Marthand Rao Holkar, who formally ascended to the throne on 17 January 1834. He was replaced by Hari Rao Holkar, nephew of Yashwantrao, who ascended to the throne on 17 April 1834. He adopted Khande Rao Holkar II on 2 July 1841 and died on 24 October 1843. Khanderao was formally installed as the ruler on 13 November 1843, but he suddenly died on 17 February 1844. Tukojirao Holkar II (1835–1886) was installed on the throne on 27 June 1844. During the Indian Rebellion of 1857, he was loyal to the British East India Company. In October 1872, he appointed T. Madhava Rao as the Diwan of Indore. He died on 17 June 1886 and was succeeded by his eldest son, Shivajirao Holkar.

Yashwantrao Holkar II (reigned 1926–1948) ruled Indore state until shortly after India's independence in 1947, when he acceded to the Union of India. Indore became a district of Madhya Bharat state, which was merged into Madhya Pradesh state in 1956.

== Holkar Maharajah's of Indore ==
1. Malhar Rao Holkar I (r. 2 November 1731 – 20 May 1766). Born 16 March 1693, died 20 May 1766
2. Male Rao Holkar (r. 20 May 1766 – 5 April 1767). Born 1745, died 5 April 1767
3. Ahilya Bai Holkar (first as a regent on 20 May 1766) (r. 27 March 1767 – 13 August 1795). Born 1725, died 13 August 1795
4. Tukoji Rao Holkar I (r. 13 August 1795 – 29 January 1797). Born 1723, died 15 August 1797
5. Kashi Rao Holkar (r. 29 January 1797 – January 1799) Born before 1776, died 1808
6. Khande Rao Holkar (r. January 1799 – 22 February 1807) Born in 1798, died 1807
7. Yashwant Rao Holkar I (first as a regent from 1799) (r. 1807 – 27 October 1811). Born 1776, died 27 October 1811
8. Malhar Rao Holkar III (r. 27 October 1811 – 27 October 1833) Born 1806, died 27 October 1833
9. Marthand Rao Holkar (r. 17 January 1833 – 2 February 1834). Born 1830, died 2 June 1849
10. Hari Rao Holkar (r. 17 April 1834 – 24 October 1843). Born 1795, died 24 October 1843
11. Khande Rao Holkar II (r. 13 November 1843 – 17 February 1844). Born 1828, died 17 March 1844
12. Tukoji Rao Holkar II (r. 27 June 1844 – 17 June 1886). Born 3 May 1835, died 17 June 1886
13. Shivaji Rao Holkar (r. 17 June 1886 – 31 January 1903). Born 11 November 1859, died 13 October 1908
14. Tukoji Rao Holkar III (r. 31 January 1903 – 26 February 1926). Born 26 November 1890, died 21 May 1978
15. Yashwant Rao Holkar II (r. 26 February 1926 – 1948). Born 6 September 1908, died 5 December 1961

On 22 April 1948 Yashwantrao Holkar II signed a covenant with the rulers of the adjoining princely states to form a new state known as Madhya Bharat. Madhya Bharat was created on 28 May 1948. On 16 June 1948, the princely state of Indore, which the House of Holkar ruled, merged with the newly independent Indian states.

== Family tree ==
Holkar dynasty and the Family tree of the Maharajas of Indore
Biological Child
Adopted Child

Malhar Rao I^{(1)} r. 1731-1766	Sibling of Malhar Rao
Khande Rao; Holkar	Ahilya Bai^{(3)} r. 1767-1795	Tanuji; Holkar
Male Rao^{(2)} r. 1766-1767	Tukoji Rao I^{(4)} r. 1795-1797
Kashi Rao^{(5)} r. 1797-1799	Vithoji Rao; Holkar	Yashwant Rao I^{(7)} r. 1807-1811	Krishna Bai	Malhar Rao II
Hari Rao^{(10)} r. 1834-1843	Malhar Rao III^{(8)} r. 1811-1833	Tukoji Rao II^{(12)} r. 1844-1886	{{{A04}}}	Khande Rao I^{(6)} r. 1799-1807
Khande Rao II^{(11)} r. 1843-1844	Marthand Rao^{(9)} r. 1833-1834	Shivaji Rao^{(13)} r. 1886-1903
Tukoji Rao III^{(14)} r. 1903-1926
Yashwant Rao II^{(15)} r. 1926-1948 – Titular – 1948-1961
Usha Devi^{(16)} – Titular – 1961-present

== See also ==
- List of Maratha dynasties and states
