= Malhar Rao Holkar III =

Maharaja of Indore from 1811 to 1833

- Maharaja (Ruler of Indore); Ali Jah (the Exalted Dignity); Zubdat ul-Umara (Best of the Army); Bahadur ul-Mulk (Hero of the Empire); Farzand-i-Arjmand (Son of the Noble); Nusrat Jang (Helper in War)
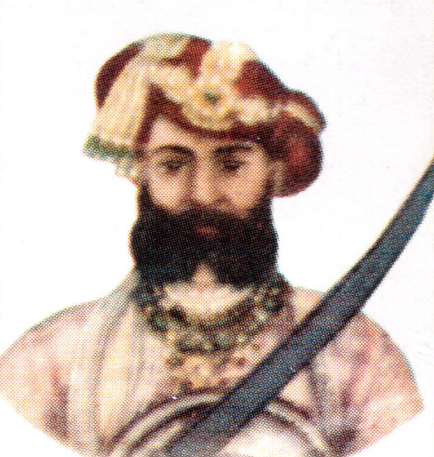
- Painting of Malhar Rao Holkar III

7th Holkar Maharaja of Indore
- Reign: 1811–1833
- Coronation: November 1811
- Predecessor: Yashwant Rao Holkar
- Successor: Marthand Rao Holkar
- Born: 1806; Bhanpura
- Died: 27 October 1833 (aged 26–27); Indore
- Father: Yashwant Rao Holkar
- Mother: Krishna Bai Holkar
- Religion: Hinduism

Maharajadhiraj Raj Rajeshwar Shrimant Malhar Rao III Holkar VII Subadar Bahadur (1806–27 October 1833), belonging to the Holkar dynasty of the Marathas was the Maharaja of (Holkar State) (r. 1811–1833). He was born at Bhanpura in 1806 and was the only son of Yashwant Rao Holkar, Subadar of the Holkar Domains, and his wife Krishna Bai Holkar Mahasahiba.

== See also ==
- Rao Tula Ram

Malhar Rao Holkar III Holkar Dynasty Born: 1806 Died: 27 October 1833
Regnal titles
Preceded by Yashwant Rao Holkar	Maharaja of Indore; 1811 – 1833	Succeeded by Marthand Rao Holkar
