= Oswald Bosanquet =

Sir Oswald Vivian Bosanquet, KCSI, CIE (5 April 1866 – 6 November 1933) was a British administrator in India. A member of the Indian Civil Service, he spent most of his career in the Indian Political Service. At the time of his retirement, he was Agent to the Governor-General in Central India.

Bosanquet was the recipient of the Kaisar-i-Hind Medal in gold in 1902. He was appointed a CIE in 1910, a CSI in 1914, and promoted to KCSI in 1919.
