= Maji Keshri Bai =

Regent of Indore from 1843 to 1849

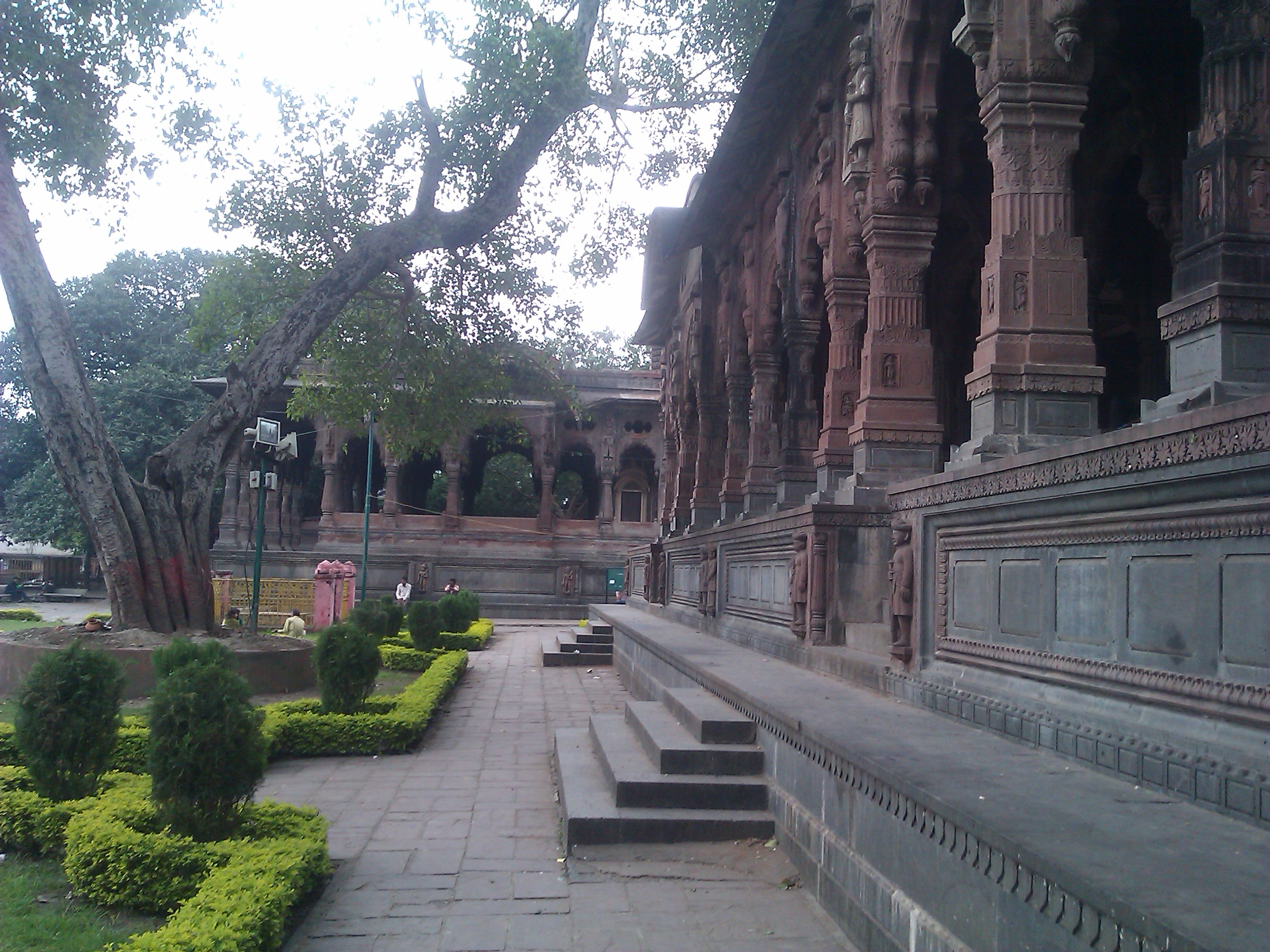
Chhatri of Krishnabai Holkar

Maharani Krishna Bai Holkar or Maji Keshri Bai (died September 1849) was the regent of the Indian Princely Indore State between 1843 and 1849. She served as regent during the minority of her adoptive son Maharajadhiraja Raj Rajeshwar Khanderao Holkar in 1843–1844 and, after his sudden death, for his successor Tukoji Rao II Holkar XI in 1844–1849.

== Life ==
She was a pottery maker before she became the harem concubine of Jaswantrao Holkar VI Subadar Bahadur, Maharaja of Indore (r. 1799–1811), whom she never formally married. She became the mother of Malhar Rao Holkar III (r. 1811–1833).

== See also ==
- Holkar
