= Yashwantrao Holkar =

Maharaja of Indore from 1799 to 1811

Yashwant Rao Holkar
- Maharaj; Maharajidhiraj Raj Rajeshwar Alija Bahadur Chakravarti
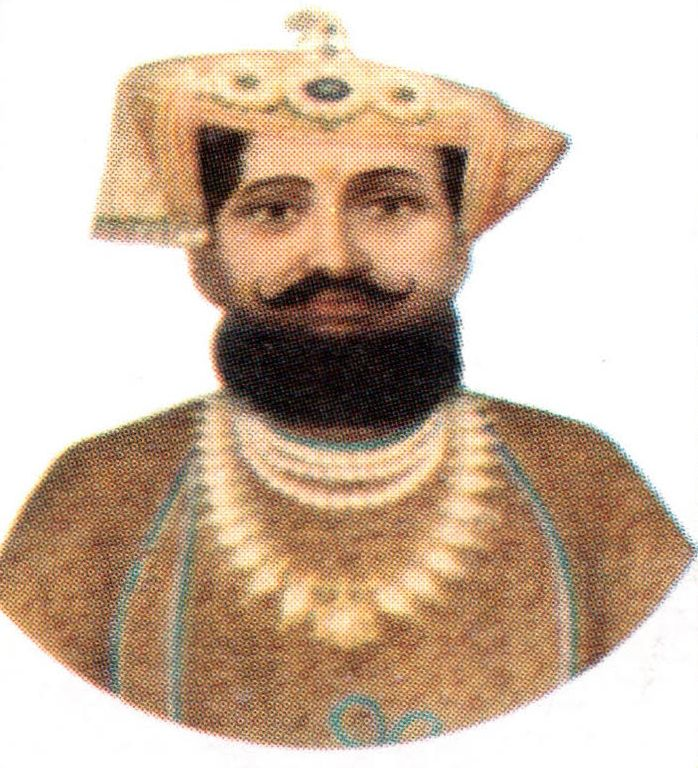

6th Holkar Maharaja of Indore
- Reign: (as regent. 1799–1807) (r. 1807–1811)
- Coronation: 6 January 1799
- Predecessor: Kashi Rao Holkar
- Successor: Malhar Rao Holkar III
- Born: 3 December 1776; Wadgaon, Maratha Confederacy (present-day Maharashtra, India)
- Died: 28 October 1811 (aged 34); Bhanpura, Malwa, Maratha Confederacy
- Spouse: Ladabai, Krishna Bai Holkar, Tulsabai
- Issue: Bhimabai, Malhar Rao Holkar III.
Names
- Yashwant Rao Holkar
- House: House of Holkar
- Father: Tukoji Rao Holkar
- Mother: Yamunabai Holkar
- Religion: Hinduism

Maharaja Yashwant Rao Holkar (3 December 1776 – 28 October 1811) also known as Jaswantrao Holkar, was an Indian statesman who was the Raja of Indore State and a well-known military officer belonging of the Holkar clan of the Maratha Empire. A gifted military leader, he was educated in accountancy as well as literate in Persian, Marathi and Urdu. An early and vigorous opponent of British schemes and attempts to dominate and colonise India, Holkar soon entered into conflict with the British East India Company, which was expanding into Central India from the coast. He fought the Second Anglo-Maratha War against the British, and though occasionally bested in the field, fought a number of successful battles and was able to compel them to enter into a treaty relationship with him that recognised Holkar as a sovereign and independent ruler, thereby escaping the humiliating subsidiary alliance treaty unlike other Maratha chiefs. His early death, however, led to most of his other strategies to halt British EIC expansion remaining unrealised.

== Early rebellion ==
Yashwant Rao was the third son of Tukoji Rao Holkar. On 29 January 1797, Tukoji appointed his eldest son Kashi Rao as his successor and head of Holkar state. Tukoji's second son Malhar Rao rebelled against his father's decision, and Jaswant joined his ranks. The rebels plundered Malwa and Khandesh, leading Kashi Rao to call in the army of Daulat Rao Scindia. On 14 September, Scindia's army led a surprise attack on the rebel camp, leading to the death of Malhar and Jaswant was wounded and fled.

On 19 September, Jaswant Rao took protection under Raghuji I, a friend of his father Tukoji. One his way to Nagpur, he met Bhawani Shankar who became a loyal servant. Once Daulat Rao became aware of Jaswant Rao's presence in Nagpur, he sent a letter to Raghuji (20 February 1798) telling him to arrest Jaswant as a rebel. Bhawani Shankar helped engineer Jaswant's escape from Nagpur.

Jaswant Rao, who was plundering the nearby countryside, initially claimed he was only attacking Kashi Rao's villages in order to be granted a jagir as was his birthright. Kashi Rao himself was an unpopular ruler, and was despised by servants of the Holkar throne for being subservient to Daulat Rao Sindia. Jaswant then began claiming to represent the interests of his infant nephew Khande Rao II (son of Malhar Rao), and asked the Peshwa to recognize Khande Rao as the head of the Holkars and Jaswant Rao as his regent. Jaswant's campaigns of plunder attracted jungle robbers, Grasias, Pindharis, and Afghans (notably Mir Khan). In Khandesh, Jaswant received many allies. He was hired by Anand Rao Pawar, Raja of Dhar, but upon his employer's failure of payment he looted the state. At this point he had raised an army of 2,000 cavalry and 5,000 infantry.

In January 1799, Jaswant Rao declared himself ruler of the Holkars. He then defeated two battalions that were under the command of Chevalier Dudrenec, the commander of Kashi Rao's main army. Jaswant entered Maheshwar, from where Dudrenec had fled to Indore. After back and forth between the two armies, Dudrenec was defeated and acknowledged Jaswant Rao as head of the Holkars in April 1799.

== Conflict with Sindhia and Peshwa ==
In June 1799 the widows of Mahadaji Shinde joined Jaswant Raos party and requested his army's aid in restoring to them Ujjain from Daulat Rao Shinde. They promised to pay Jaswant four lakh rupees; but Ambaji Ingle offer Jaswant five lakh rupees to betray them which Jaswant accepted. Jaswant proceeded to loot the city and citizens of Ujjain all the while claming to be the representative of Daulat Rao. Jaswant Rao then left the city to fight Lakhwa Dada. However, the Peshwa followed the advice of Daulat Rao in declaring Kashi Rao the ruler of the Holkars, which lead Jaswant Rao to make peace with Lakhwa Dada.

=== Battle of Poona ===
He conquered Sendhwa, Chalisgaon, Dhule, Malegaon, Parol, Ner, Yavatmal, Ahmadnagar, Rahuri, Nashik, Sinnar, Dungargaon, Jamgaon, Pharabagh, Gardond, Pandharpur, Kurkumb, Narayangaon, Baramati, Purandhar, Saswad, Moreshwar, Thalner, and Jejuri. On Sunday, 25 October 1802, on the festival of Diwali, Yashwantrao Holkar defeated the combined armies of Scindia and Peshwa at Hadapsar, near Pune. This Battle of Poona took place at Ghorpadi, Wanawdi, and Hadapsar. Yashwantrao Holkar had ordered his army not to attack first and wait until 25 cannonballs were fired from other side; when 25 cannonballs were fired, Yashwantrao Holkar ordered his army to attack. As soon as he won the war, he ordered his army not to harm the civilians of Pune. When the Peshwa learned that he was defeated, he fled from Pune via Parvati, Wadgaon, to Sinhagad. Yashwantrao Holkar asked the Peshwa to return to Pune. If Maharaja Yashwantrao Holkar wanted to arrest the Peshwa, he would have arrested him; but he sent food to Peshwa so that he didn't suffer.

The British also had to check the French influence in India. The British Government feared that if they had not adopted measures for the restoration of the Peshwa's authority, Yashwantrao Holkar would have either attacked the company's territories, or those of their ally the Nizam of Hyderabad. They felt, therefore, the restoration of the Peshwa under the protection of the British power was a measure indispensably requisite for the defence, not only of the territories of their allies, but of their own possessions bordering on the Maratha dominions in the peninsula of India.

=== Peshwai ===
The flight of Peshwa left the government of Maratha state in the hands of Yashwantrao Holkar. After conquering Pune, the capital of the Maratha Empire, Yashwantrao Holkar took the administration in his hands and appointed his men. The Conquest of Pune left Holkar in charge of the administration and he took some constructive steps to rebuild the Maratha Empire. He appointed Amrutrao as the Peshwa. All except Gaekwad chief of Baroda, who had already accepted British protection by a separate treaty on 29 July 1802, supported the new regime.

== War with the British ==
=== Siege of Delhi ===
In Delhi, the Mughal Emperor Shah Alam II had become puppet monarch of his new masters, the British who successfully replaced Marathas after defeating Sindhia. On 8 October 1804, to gain control over the emperor, Holkar marched towards Delhi and attacked the army of Colonel Ochterlony and Berne. The Siege of Delhi (1804) lasted for more than a week, but Holkar could not succeed because the emperor sent his army for the British defenders with Colonel Ochterlony and supported by Lord Lake. Assessing the situation, Holkar changed the plan, and postponed the siege. Admiring his bravery, the Emperor Shah Alam gave him the title of Maharajadhiraja Raj Rajeshwar Alija Bahadur as a token of admiration for his bravery.

=== Battles ===
The failure of General Lake to conquer the fort of Bharatpur shattered the myth of invincibility of British arms, and raised the fears about the revival of Maratha Confederacy to counter Wellesley's military designs in India. This came as an anti-climax to Lord Wellesley's 'forward policy'. The British Prime Minister was therefore constrained to retort that "the Marquis had acted most imprudently and illegally, and that he could not be suffered to remain in the government". Thus Wellesley was recalled.

== Attempting to unite the Maratha Confederacy and rest of the Indian kings ==
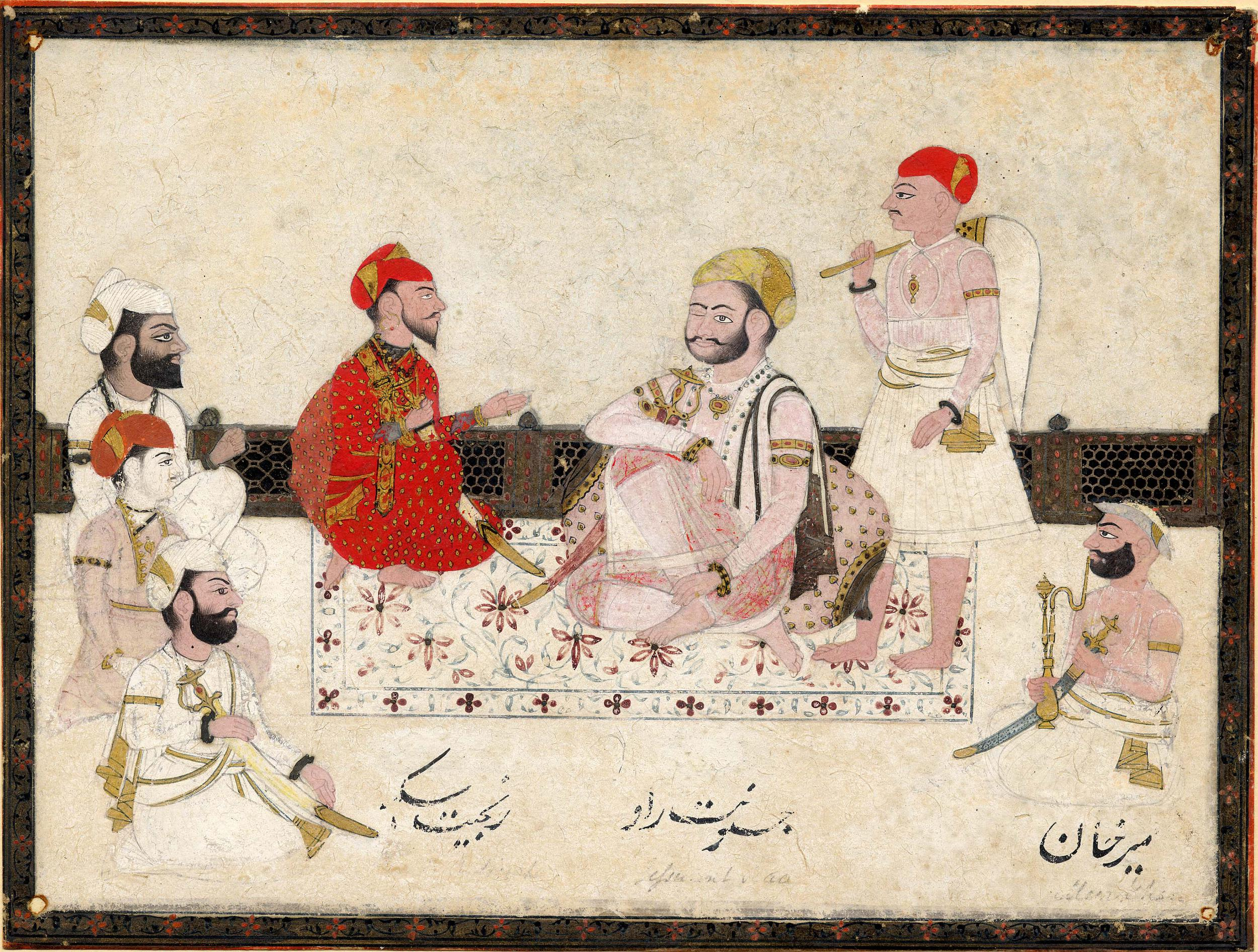
Maratha chief Yashwantrao Holkar (right) meeting with Sikh ruler Maharaja Ranjit Singh (left).

Yashwantrao Holkar, Satara Chattrapati, and Chatarsinh met at Sabalgad. It was decided that, united, they would uproot the British from Indian soil. However Daulat Rao Scindia, unlike his predecessor, had become very passive after the Treaty of Surji Anjangaon, he had lost his morale to fight the British and preferred to have friendly relations with them rather than fight a losing war. In September 1805, Holkar reached Ajmer. Maharaja Man Singh of Marwar sent his army to support Holkar, however, this army was intercepted by Scindia and destroyed. This was a sign that Scindia had chosen the British side. Yashwantrao Holkar sent letters to the rest of the kings of India, appealing to them to fight against the British. The King of Jaipur, Bhosale of Nagpur, accepted his appeal but did not give any direct help. When the British learned that Holkar was planning a grand war for independence, they informed Lord Lake to pursue Holkar. In a letter dated 15 February 1806 to Vyankoji Bhosale of Nagpur he states:

The Maratha state had been grasped by foreigners. To resist their aggression, God knows, how during the last two and a half years I sacrificed everything, fighting night and day, without a moment's rest. I paid a visit to Daulatrao Sindia and explained to him how necessary it was for all of us to join in averting foreign domination. But Daulatrao failed me. It was mutual cooperation and goodwill which enabled our ancestors to build up, the Maratha states. But now we have all become self-seekers. You wrote to me that you were coming for my support, but you did not make your promise good. If you had advanced into Bengal as was planned, we could have paralyzed the British Government. It is no use of now talking of past things. When I found myself abandoned on all sides, I accepted the offer which the British agents brought to me and concluded the war.

As soon as the British learned this, they sent Bagh Singh, uncle of Ranjit Singh, to prevent Ranjit Singh from supporting Yashwantrao Holkar. The British requested Ranjit Singh to immediately break off all communications with the Maratha. Afterwards Yaswantrao had fled to the Sikh Empire where the British asked Ranjit Singh to arrest him. Ranjit Singh disagreed and stated that Yaswantrao would be allowed into his territory as long as they remain 30 kos away from the Sikh army. After an agreement the British stated that the warrant of arrest would not be on Yaswantrao's head and he would be safely put back on the throne. Ranjit Singh agreed and put Yaswantrao Holkar back.

Afterwards during the Sikh-Phulkian Wars Bharapur accepted Ranjit Singh's supremacy although the British annexed the states and signed the Treaty of Lahore with them. The Marathas earlier had expanded their sway into Punjab, capturing the whole region, however, they broke their alliance with the Sikhs after it which led to mistrust between them.

Afraid of the possibility of Holkar uniting the Indian Rajas against them, the British decided to make peace with him. Yashwant Rao then proceeded to sign a treaty with the British on 24 December 1805, at Rajghat (then in Punjab, which is now in Delhi). Yashwant Rao was known to be the only king in India whom the British approached to sign a peace treaty on equal terms. The British returned all his territory, and accepted his dominion over Jaipur, Udaipur, Kota, Bundi and also affirmed not to interfere in matters relating to the Holkars. He had to give up claims to Bundelkhand and territories to the north of Chambal river. The Marathas, thus, were defeated and reduced to British vassalage, with Peshwa under British control. Yashwantrao could maintain some independence and the victorious king reached Indore and started ruling his newly expanded kingdom.

== Holkar-British treaty ==
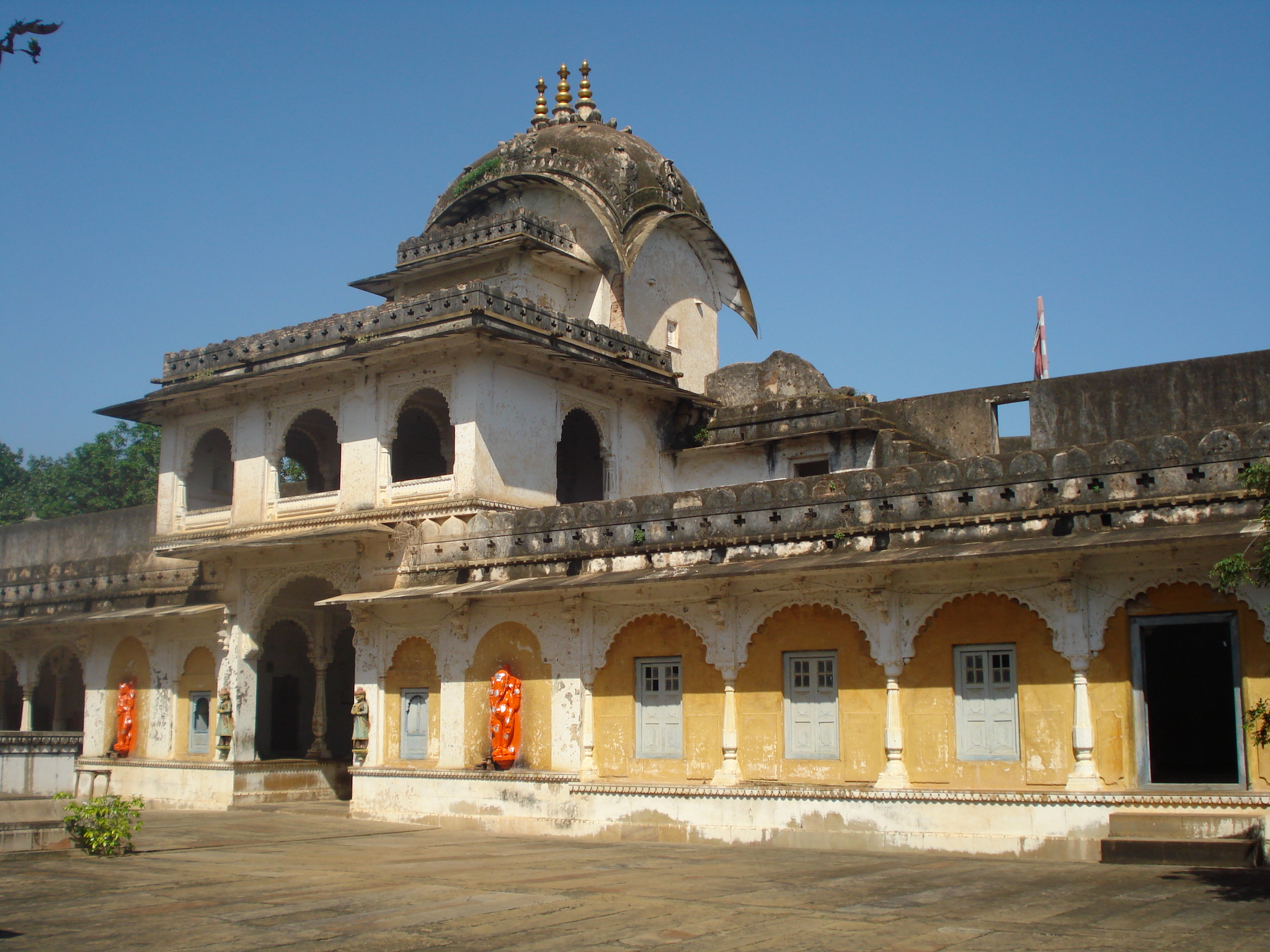
Chhatri of Maharaja Yashwantrao Holkar at Bhanpura

Lord Lake denounced the abandonment of Indian allies by the company, resigned his post in protest, and returned to England.

In a letter dated 14 March 1806 addressed to Mr. Sherer, Charles Metcalfe, 1st Baron Metcalfe, who witnessed the treaty, states, "But why do I constantly harp upon the character of our Government? I believe it is because I am compelled to feel that we are disgraced; and that Holkar is the prevailing power in Hindostan." Mr. Metcalfe many years later looking back admitted that the measures adopted by Sir George Barlow were necessitated and it was hardly possible to have followed any other course.

== Aftermath ==
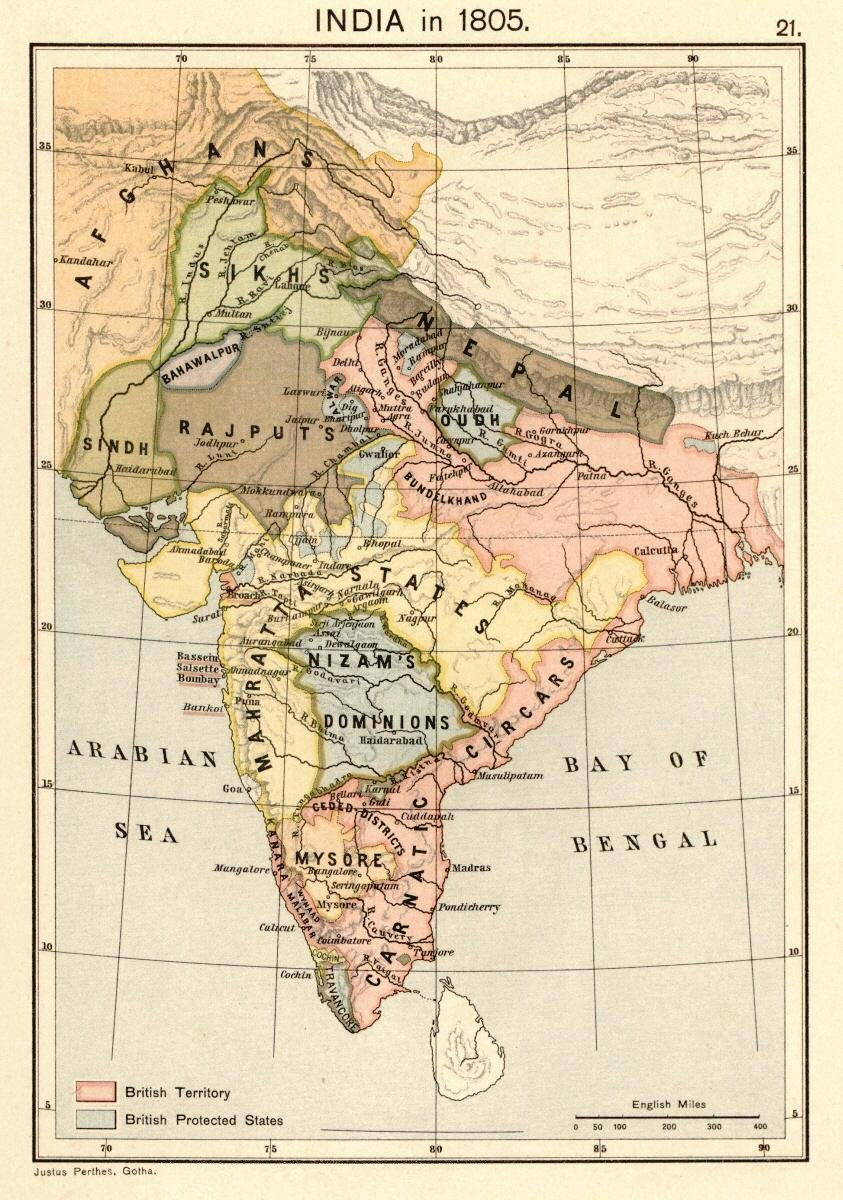
Maratha State in 1805

His battles were significant in the history of Indian wars and the title given to him by the Mughal Emperor gave him a prominent position amongst the rulers of India.

== Legacy ==
Yashwantrao was a gifted organizer and a skilled military commander. He structured the various branches of his army on a sound military basis. As a strategist, he is regarded as one of the foremost generals in Indian history. His achievements highlighted his military genius, political acumen, and indefatigable industry. He remains one of the most significant and celebrated figures in Indian history. Yashwant Rao Holkar rose to power from humble beginnings through his personal valour and spirit of adventure. His strong personality was such that, even during turbulent times, no state or power dared to commit aggression against his territory. This influence helped keep the Holkar State secure for some years even after his death.

== See also ==
- Second Anglo-Maratha War
- Maratha Empire
- Battle of Farrukhabad
- Holkar

== Books ==
- (Adv Vijaykumar N Dudhbhate)
- Zhunj (झुंज) By N.S. Inamdar
- Maharaja Yashwant Rao Holkar By Sanjay Sonawani
- Shrimanr Maharaj Yashwant Rao Holkar : Maratheshahiakhercha Adwitiya Swatantryaveer By Narahar Raghunath Phatak
- Waqai-Holkar By Mohan Singh, English Translation:- Sir Jadunath Sarkar, Edited By:- Raghubir Sinh.*( Hindustani yeshwantacha iteehas by principal madhukar salgare .Marathi edition 2017
- Maharaja Yashwant Rao Holkar : Bhartiya Swatantra Ke Mahanayak By Ghanshyam Holkar (PhD)

Yashwantrao Holkar Holkar Dynasty Born: 3 December 1776 Died: 27 October 1811
Regnal titles
Preceded by Khande Rao Holkar	Maharaja of Indore; 1807 – 1811	Succeeded by Malhar Rao Holkar III
