= Bhima Kheda =

Bhimakheda is a village near Mehidpur City, India. It is located in the state of Madhya Pradesh and the district Ujjain. This village was named after the Bhima bai Holkar of Mehidpur city. As of the 2011 Census of India, it has a population of 1862 spread over 304 households.
