= Bhima Bai Holkar =

Holkar Princess of Indore
- Born: 17 September 1795; Rajwada indore district Madhya Pradesh India
- Died: 28 November 1858 (aged 63); Indore, Madhya Pradesh
- Father: Maharaja Yashwantrao Holkar
- Mother: Krishna Bai Holkar
- Religion: Hinduism

Bhima Bai Holkar (17 September 1795 – 28 November 1858) was a daughter of Yashwant Rao Holkar, Maharaja of Indore. She was the granddaughter of queen Ahilya Bai Holkar and the elder sister of Malhar Rao Holkar III.

In 1817, Bhima Bai Holkar fought bravely against the British general John Malcolm and defeated him in guerilla warfare. At the Battle of Mahidpur, she led a brigade of 2,500 cavalry, sword and lance in hand, against the British at Mahidpur. It is believed that her act of taking on the East India Company as a soldier inspired Rani Lakshmibai of Jhansi during the Indian Rebellion of 1857.

She died at Indore on 28 November 1858. One village was named after her name Bhimakhera or Bhimakheda, nearest village in Mahidpur.

== Early life ==
Bhima prematurely lost her husband and began living the secluded life of a widow. Soon she lost her father too. When she came to know that the British were planning to annex the state of Indore, she lamented that her motherland "which had been made prosperous by the blood and sweat of illustrious ancestors like Ahilya Bai Holkar and my father must be saved from the clutches of the foreigners." She put away the veil of a widow and vowed to fight the British.

== Battle of Mahidpur ==
On 21 December 1817, an Army of the East India Company, led by Sir Thomas Hislop, attacked the Holkar army led by 11-year-old Maharaja Malhar Rao Holkar II, and 22-year-old Bhima Bai Holkar. The Holkar artillery, led by Roshan Beg, attacked them with a long line of 63 cannons. At one point, the British were on the verge of losing the battle. However, they were helped by Gafur Khan, a traitor in the Holkar's camp. Khan deserted the battlefield with the force under his command. After this, the Holkars were decisively defeated. By the treaty of Mandsaur on 6 January 1818, made after this defeat, all the Holkar territory south of the Satpudas, including the entire district of Khandesh, was ceded to the British. Maharani Bhima Bai saheb Holkar was arrested and jailed till her death.

== See also ==
- Holkar
