= Battle of Mahidpur =

1817 battle of the Third Anglo-Maratha War

- Part of the Third Anglo-Maratha War
Date	21 December 1817
Location	Mahidpur, Malwa, India 23°29′14″N 75°39′26″E
Result	British victory

Belligerents
(East India Company) East India Co.	Indore State

Commanders and leaders
(East India Company) Thomas Hislop; (East India Company) John Malcolm	Malhar Rao Holkar III; Hari Rao Holkar; Bhima Bai Holkar

Units involved
(East India Company) Army of the Deccan; (East India Company) 1st Division; (East India Company) 3rd Division	Army of Malhar Rao Holkar III

Casualties and losses
174 killed 604 wounded	Around 3,000 killed or wounded

The Battle of Mahidpur was fought during the Third Anglo-Maratha War between the Indore State of the Maratha Confederacy and the British East India Company at Mahidpur, a town in the Malwa region, on 21 December 1817.

On 21 December 1817, the British, led by Sir Thomas Hislop, attacked the Holkar army led by 11-year-old Maharaja Malhar Rao Holkar III, 22-year-old Hari Rao Holkar and 20-year-old Bhima Bai Holkar. The Holkar artillery, led by Roshan Beg, attacked them with a long line of 63 cannons. At one point, the British were on the verge of losing the battle. However, they were helped by Gafur Khan, a traitor in the Holkar camp. Khan deserted the battlefield with the force under his command. After this, the Holkars were decisively defeated.

Malhar Rao III, Tatya Jog and others escaped to Alot. A peace treaty was signed on 6 January 1818 at Mandsaur. The Holkars accepted all the terms laid down by the British in the Treaty of Mandsaur. At the conclusion of this Third Anglo-Maratha War, the Holkars lost much of their territory to the British and were incorporated into the British Raj as a princely state of the Central India Agency.

This battle led to the final destruction of Maratha power. Baji Rao II, who was trying to consolidate Marathas, finally surrendered in June 1818. The British abolished the position of the Peshwa (prime minister), and the Marathas were limited to the small kingdom of Satara until its annexation into Bombay state in 1848.

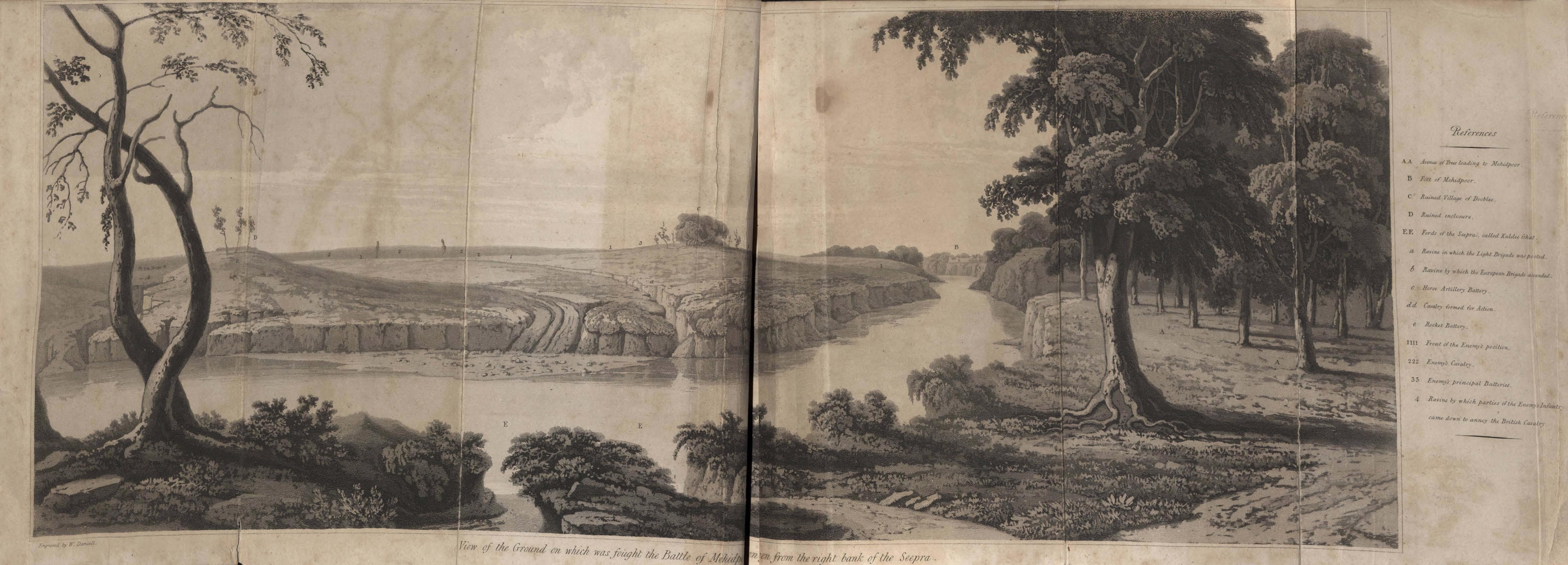
Battlefield of Mahidpur from the Shipra River, December 1817.

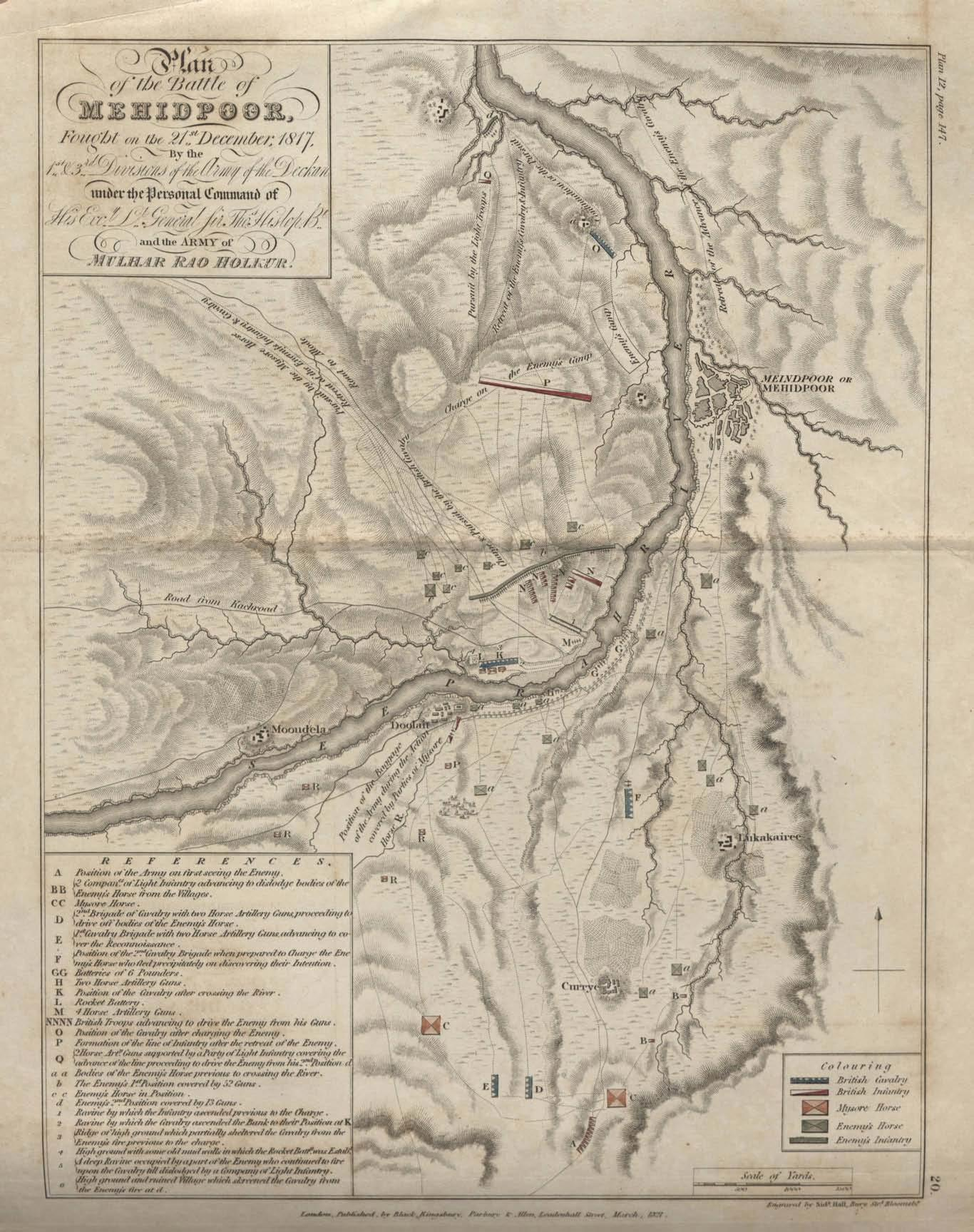
Plan of the Battle of Mahidpur, 21 December 1817.

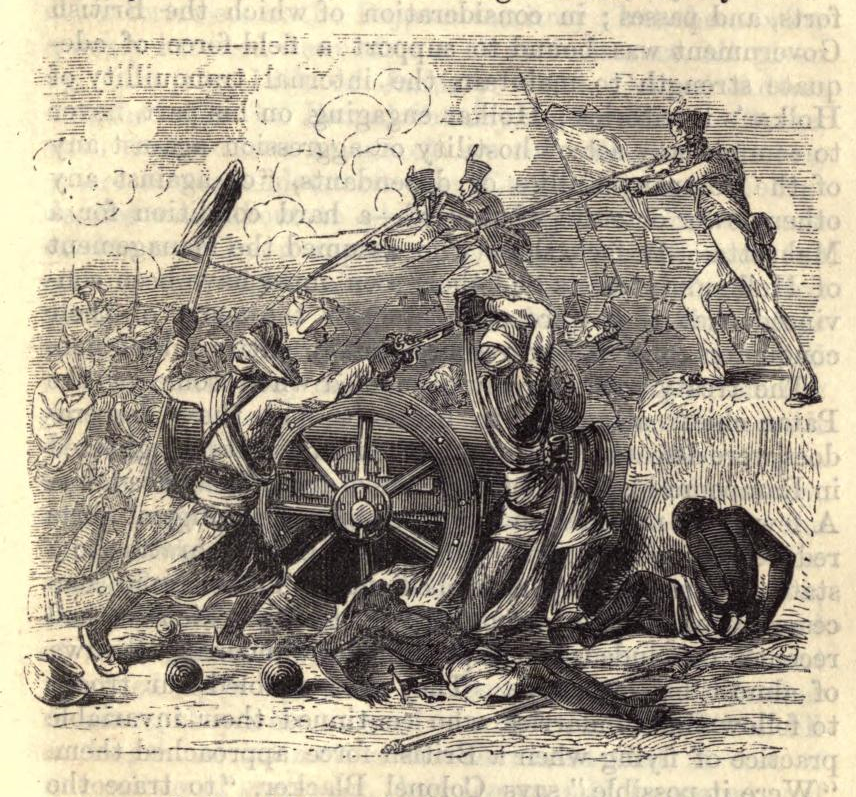
Capturing Holkar guns.
