= Mahidpur =

Mahidpur City Mehidpur City
- City
- Location in Madhya Pradesh, India
- Coordinates: 23°29′14″N 75°39′26″E
- Country: India
- State: Madhya Pradesh
- District: Ujjain
- Founder: Raja Maheda Bhil

Population (2011)
  - Total: 34,365

Languages
  - Official: Hindi
- Time zone: UTC+5:30 (IST)
- PIN: 456443
- Vehicle registration: MP 13

Mahidpur City is a city and a municipality, near Ujjain city in Ujjain district in the Indian state of Madhya Pradesh. Mahidpur City takes its name from Raja Maheda Bhil, who was the founder of Mahidpur. The modern town of Mahidpur is situated on the bank of river Shipra. It is located in the Malwa region. At present, the town is a tehsil place of Ujjain district.

Several chalcolithic remains have been excavated in this town. The Battle of Mahidpur between the Marathas and the British was also fought in this location. The former Commander-in Chief of India, Sir Claud William Jacob was born here in 1863.

== Geography ==
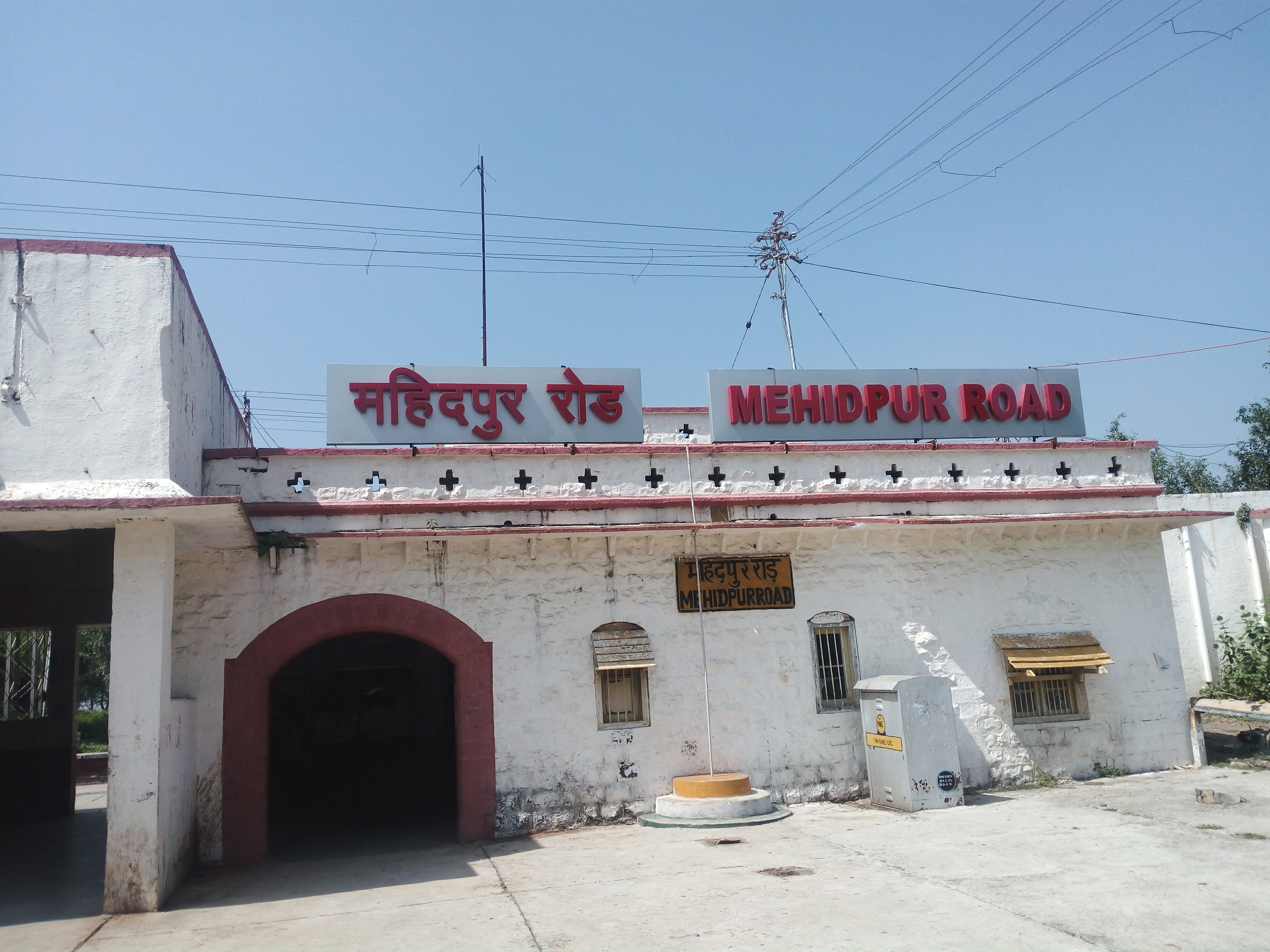
Mehidpur Road Railway Station, A station nearest to Mehidpur City

It is situated at a distance of 56 km southwest of Ujjain town by bus and 18 km from Mehidpur-Road Railway station on Delhi-Mumbai line of Western Railway. The town is well connected by road to Ujjain, Ratlam, Nagda, and Agar.

== History ==
Mahidpur or mehidpur during British India was in Indore state of Central India, on the right bank of the Kshipra, 1,543 feet (470 m) above sea level, and 24 metres (79 ft) north of Ujjain, which in 1901 had a population of 6,681. Mahidpur belonged to Rajewagh (Now Waghraje).Though of some antiquity and frequented by Hindu pilgrims, it is best known for the battle fought in the neighbourhood on 20 December 1817 (Battle of Mahidpur), in which Sir John Malcolm defeated the army of Holkar. The result was the Treaty of Mandasor and the pacification of Malwa. Mahidpur was again the scene of fights during the Indian Mutiny. The British cantonment, placed here in 1817, was removed in 1882.

Located at the bank of river Kshripra, city still has dilapidated old fort. Remnants of the war could be seen at a place named "Bhasmi Tekri" (Ashes Hill). City also has one of the oldest Mahalakshmi temples in the battlefield. Tala Kunchi ki Bawdi (Lock & Key Well) near the battlefield is supposedly the underground link to flee Mahidpur fort.

== Demographics ==
As of 2001 India census, Mahidpur had a population of 34,365. Males constitute 52% of the population and females 48%. Mahidpur has an average literacy rate of 62%, higher than the national average of 59.5%: male literacy is 70%, and female literacy is 52%. In Mahidpur, 17% of the population is under 6 years of age.

== Villages ==
- Bhima Kheda

== Industry ==
A major chunk of the population is employed in the agricultural and related sectors, dealing directly or Transportation indirectly with the agricultural produce. Major crops grown are wheat, chick pea, pigeon pea, soybean, and corn. Mahidpur is known for agricultural produce such as ghee, mawa (thickened milk) and namkin.

== Bibliography ==
- Chalcolithic site of Ujjain region, Mahidpur: excavation report. Sharada Pub. House. 2004. ISBN 978-81-88934-23-2.
