= Holkar (disambiguation) =

Holkar may refer to:

- House of Holkar, a noble family within the Maratha Confederacy
- Holkar Stadium, a cricket stadium located in Indore, Madhya Pradesh, India
- Madhya Pradesh cricket team, formerly known as Holkar cricket team, based in Madhya Pradesh, India
- Holkar Science College, an institute located in Indore, Madhya Pradesh, India
- Holkar State, also known as Indore State, a historical princely state in India
- Holkar Chhatris, also known as Krishnapura Chhatri, a set of three memorial in Indore, Madhya Pradesh, India
