= Chappan Dukan =

Street food market in Indore, India

- A Sweet Shop in Chappan Dukan
- Location: Indore, Madhya Pradesh, India
- Opening date: 1974
- Goods sold: Street food and Cuisine

Chappan Dukan, (also written as 56 Dukan), is a food and shopping street located in Indore, Madhya Pradesh, India. It is known for its active street food scene and variety of shops, establishing itself as a notable landmark for residents and visitors alike.

Chappan Dukan accommodates 56 food shops within a distance of approximately 200 meters, situated in the upscale Palasia area of Indore.

== History ==
Until 1974, the area was referred to as the Udasin Ashram Market. It was a sparsely wooded region lacking specialized facilities. The local administration of Indore recognized the need for improvement. Consequently, a market was established for the vendors, consisting of 56 shops. This market was officially recorded in government records under the name Udasin Ashram Market. Vendors engaged in mobile businesses were allotted these shops at a cost of 2500 rupees each. The dimensions of these shops were a mere six by eight, allowing space for a handcart. During that period, the market primarily catered to the retail sale of items like vegetables. However, with time, new individuals acquired these shops and introduced a variety of offerings.

Between the 1980s and 1990s, the Chappan Dukan area became synonymous with Indore and earned the moniker "56 Dukan". In 2000, a major transformation took place which made widespread recognition across Madhya Pradesh and the nation. The market's popularity attracted celebrities, officials, and leaders, who frequently included it in their Indore visits, sometimes accompanied by their families.

In 2020, Chappan Dukan was redeveloped into a smart food street by Indore Smart City Development Limited (ISCDL), with the project costing approximately ₹4 crore (40 million rupees). The area has been designated a 'No Vehicle' zone.

Chappan Dukan has its own radio station, which was launched in 2022, catering to both shopkeepers and visitors. This marks the first instance of its kind in Madhya Pradesh, where 56 shops have their individual radio stations—a concept previously seen in malls of Mumbai, Bengaluru, and Hyderabad.

The Times of India reported in 2019 that the food shops at Chappan Dukan have reportedly contributed approximately 40% (estimated based on shopkeepers' statements) to the city's annual food market turnover of ₹5,000 crore.

== Recognition ==
In September 2021, Chappan Dukan received an award from Food Safety and Standards Authority of India (FSSAI) for being a 'Clean Street Food' hub in Indore. It a FSSAI certified street food hub. In April 2022, Indore Smart City Development was awarded the First Prize for Chappan Dukan in the Built Environment category in the Smart Cities Conference held in Gujarat .
