= Indore Police =

Coordinates: 22.4200°N 75.5400°E

Indore Police Commissionerate

Agency overview
- Formed: 1872

Jurisdictional structure
- Area: 3,898 square kilometres (1,505 sq mi)
- Population: 3,272,335 (2011)
- General nature: Local civilian police

Operational structure
- Overseen by: State Government
- Headquarters: The Office of Commissioner of Police
- Agency executive: IPS Shri Hari Narayan Chari Mishra Commissioner of Police, Inspector General Of Police(IG)
- Parent agency: Madhya Pradesh Police

Facilities
- Police Stations: 32

Website
- Indore Police

Indore Police is the law enforcement agency for Indore, which is under the jurisdiction and command of Madhya Pradesh Police. MP Police (District Indore) serves a region of three million people.

A police commissioner system has been implemented from December 2021 with IG as commissioner.

== List of superintendents of police ==
S.no.	Name	Start	End
1	B.B. Mane Patil	21 February 1955	21 May 1962
2	K. K. Dave	19 June 1962	24 February 1964
3	Shri M. K. Pateria	25 February 1964	2 September 1964
4	S. P. Mishra	3 September 1965	21 October 1967
5	C. S. Kadam	22 October 1967	17 September 1969
6	M. Natarajan	3 November 1969	12 September 1972
7	V.K. Dharkar	26 September 1972	18 May 1973
8	Surjeet Singh	19 May 1973	24 April 1977
9	R.L.S. Yadav	1 May 1977	7 November 1981
10	V.K. Dharkar	20 June 1980	7 November 1981
11	R.L. Verma	19 January 1984	21 May 1986
12	Pannalal	1 June 1986	22 May 1987
13	V.S. Choubey	23 May 1987	10 March 1988
14	S.K. Rout	11 March 1988	17 October 1989
15	S.S. Shukla	18 October 1989	14 September 1990
16	A.K. Dhasmana	15 September 1990	31 July 1993
17	Rustam Singh	31 July 1993	24 June 1996
18	D.S. Sengar	24 June 1996	19 June 2000
19	B.B.S. Thakur	19 June 2000	7 May 2003
20	V. Madhu Kumar	7 May 2003	24 August 2004
21	Adarsh Katiyar	24 August 2004	15 July 2006
22	Anshuman Yadav	15 July 2006	14 June 2008
23	R.K. Chaudhary	14 June 2008	25 October 2008
24	Sanjeev Shami	25 October 2008	25 June 2009

=== List of senior superintendents of police ===
S.no.	Name	Start	End
1	V.K. Maheshwari	25 June 2009	1 January 2010
2	D. Shriniwas Rao	2 January 2010	19 August 2011
3	A. SAI Manohar	19 August 2011	28 July 2012

=== List of deputy inspectors general of police ===
S.no.	Name	Start	End
1	A. SAI Manohar	28 July 2012	8 January 2013
2	Rakesh Gupta	17 January 2013	20 May 2015
3	Santosh kumar Singh	20 May 2015	5 December 2016
4	Harinarayana Chari Mishra	5 December 2016	12 February 2019
5	Ruchivardhan Mishra	12 February 2019	29 March 2020
6	Harinarayana Chari Mishra	29 March 2020	4 February 2021
7	Manish Kapuriya	5 February 2021	9 December 2021

=== List of commissioners of police ===
S.no.	Name	Start	End
1	Harinarayana Chari Mishra	9 December 2021	

== History ==
=== Early years (1870-1910) ===
Indore city was divided into sub-divisions for police control. Each division was headed by a daroga, and all the darogas used to follow the instructions of the city faujdaar. The men that held post at various police stations were in fact soldiers, usually privates (Persian: sepoys, commonly referred to as jawans). In 1872, a renovation project prepared by Sir T. Madhava Rao handed over the services of all sepoys, cavalry, and senior officials from the military to the judicial cabinet. That administration reform created a clear demarcation between the police and the military.

In 1886, the population of Indore city was about 75,400, which included 864 sepoys (a ratio of 1 jawan per 87 people). Col. Thakur, the first Inspector General of the Indore police, directed his officers to refer to the rules and regulations as framed by the British rulers of India. However, this system was abolished on October 6, 1896, and around 500 jawans were shifted to the police department.

The total annual expense of the state at that time was ₹52,250. This was due to the death of most of the police jawans in the 1903 epidemic and the general public not being ready to be recruited. In 1907, the police administration was once again divided to improve the control of the city, and all of the police chowkis got connected by telephone lines.
