= Khajrana Ganesh Temple =

Temple in Madhya Pradesh, India

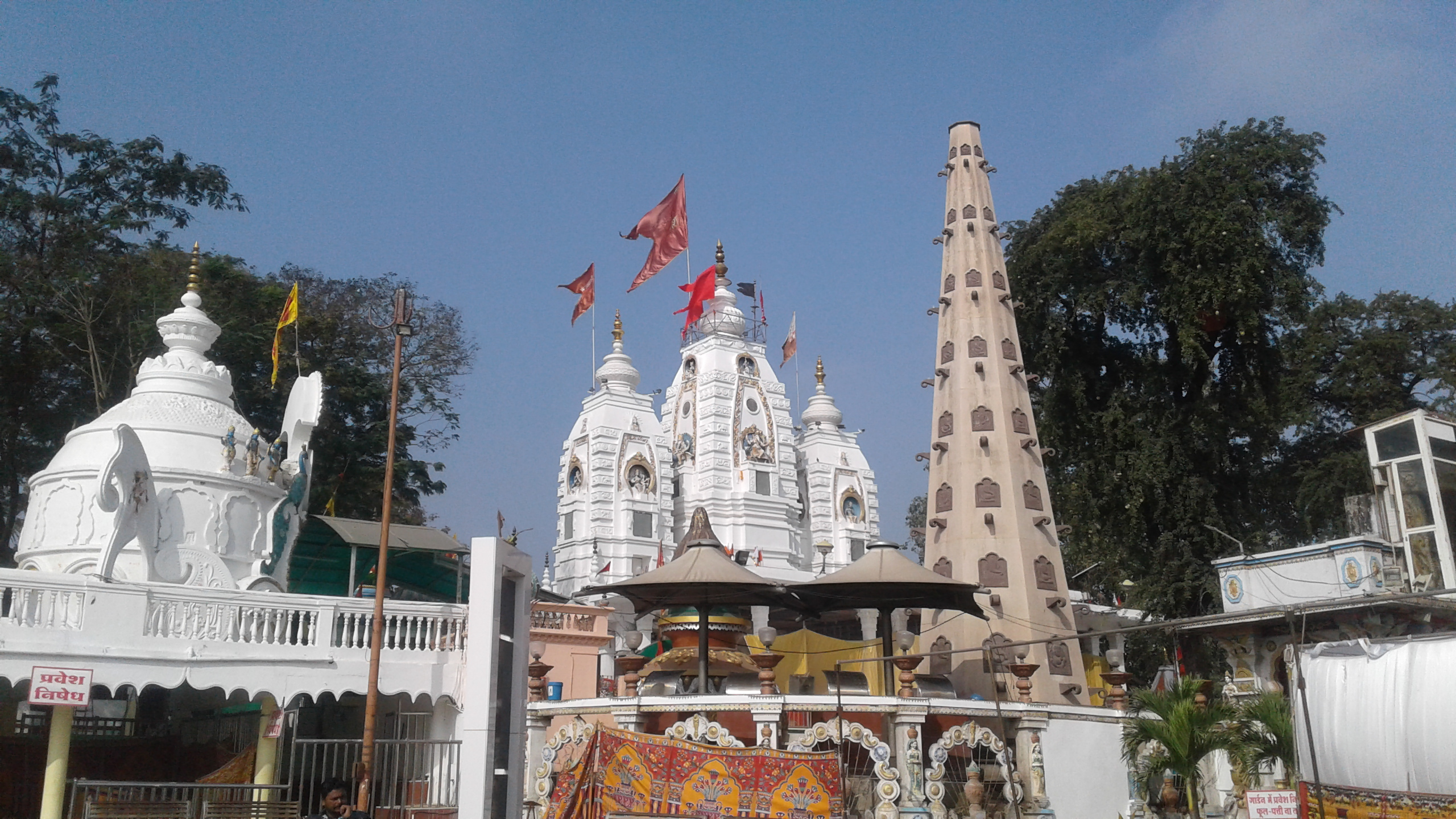

Religion
- Affiliation: Hinduism
- District: Indore
- Deity: Lord Ganesha

Location
- Location: Indore
- State: Madhya Pradesh
- Country: India

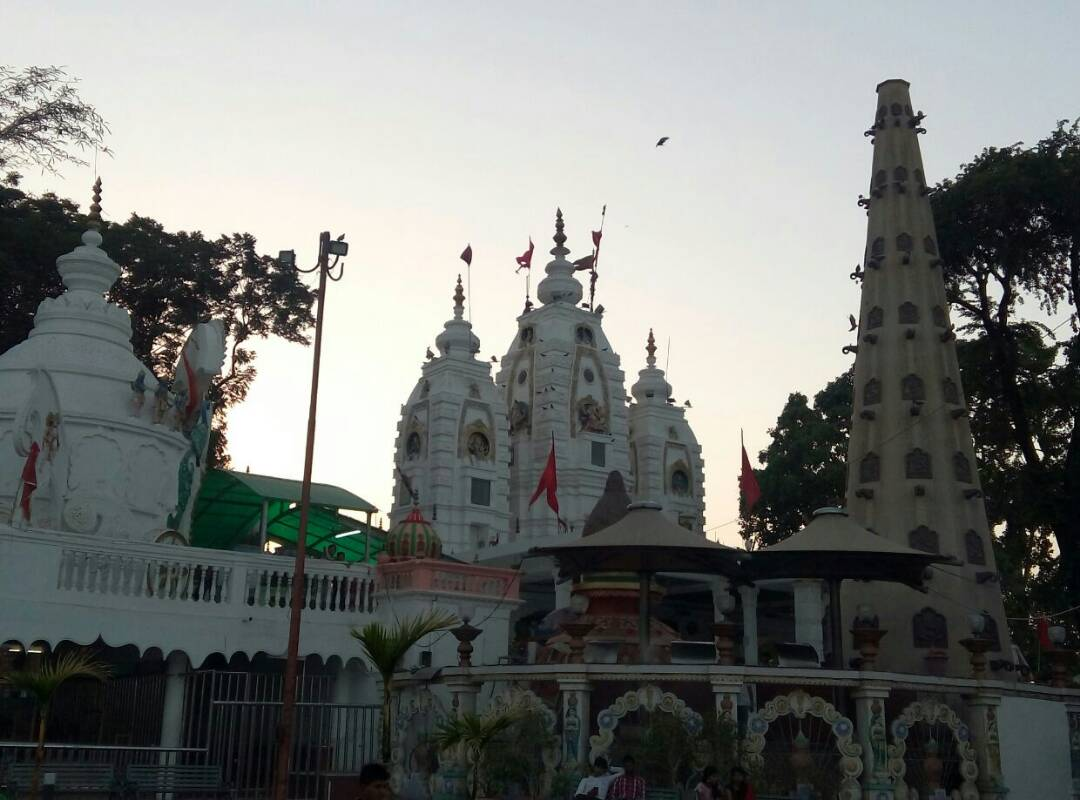
Khajrana Temple's Building

Khajrana Ganesh Temple is a Hindu temple complex, situated in Khajrana area of Indore in the Indian state of Madhya Pradesh, India. The main temple in the complex is dedicated to Lord Ganesha. It was built by Maharani Ahilyabai Holkar of the Holkar Dynasty.

== History ==
This temple was built in 1735 by Maharani Ahilyabai Holkar of the Holkar dynasty, who retrieved the idol of god Ganesha from a well where it had once been hidden to keep it safe during the reign of the Mughal emperor Aurangzeb. The devotees circle around the temple and tie a thread to pray to Lord Ganesha for the successful completion of their work. It is said that the ancient idol in the temple was seen in a dream of a local priest, Pandit Mangal Bhatt. The temple is still managed by the Bhatt family.

== Development ==
From a small hut to a huge structure, the temple has developed a lot over the years. The temple regularly receives money, gold, diamonds and other precious jewels in the form of donations. The gate, the outer and upper walls of the Garbhagriha are made of Silver and different moods and festivals are depicted on it. The eyes of the deity are made of diamonds which were donated by a businessman of Indore.

Currently it is under the control of DM of Indore, and priests are on monthly salaries. The area around the temple has also been developed for easy access.
