= 2025 Indore drinking water contamination =

Water pollution in Indore, Madhya Pradesh, India

- Date: 29 December 2025
- Time: (IST)
- Location: Bhagirathpura, Indore, Indore district, Madhya Pradesh, India
- Type: Water Pollution
- Cause: Bacterial contamination
- Deaths: 32(till 20th February,2026)
- Injuries: 1400

2025 Indore drinking water contamination was a public health crisis that occurred in Bhagirathpura, a locality in Indore, Madhya Pradesh, India. At least 15 people died, and approximately 270 others were hospitalised after the municipal drinking water became contaminated, resulting in a widespread outbreak of waterborne disease. Affected individuals reported symptoms including vomiting and diarrhoea. Investigations indicated that the contamination was caused by sewage entering the drinking water supply, likely due to a leak in a water pipeline.

== Background ==
Indore has consistently ranked as one of the cleanest cities in India, holding the first position for eight consecutive years as of 2025. In mid-December 2025, residents of Bhagirathpura began noticing that the municipal drinking water supplied through underground pipelines appeared discolored and had a foul odour. Locals repeatedly reported concerns about water quality to civic officials. On 25 December 2025, many households observed that the water had a bitter taste and strong odour, but continued using it for drinking and other daily needs due to limited alternatives.

On 27 December 2025, the first cases of illness were reported. Residents experienced vomiting, diarrhoea, dehydration, and weakness after consuming the municipal tap water. The cases are reportedly increased in the following day.

== Incident ==
On 29 December 2025, Indore Mayor Pushyamitra Bhargava confirmed at least three deaths linked to diarrhoea reportedly caused by contaminated water. Hospital admissions increased, and reports indicated that over 1,400 residents experienced gastrointestinal symptoms consistent with waterborne infection.

Local media later reported that the death toll had risen to 23, with at least 32 patients remaining in intensive care units and 200 hospitalised. Madhya Pradesh Chief Minister Mohan Yadav stated that the state conducted door-to-door visits, screening approximately 40,000 residents and identifying 2,456 suspected cases, who were provided with first aid.

The laboratory tests confirmed bacterial contamination in the municipal water supply, including bacteria typically found in sewage containing human waste. Authorities stated that a public toilet for police outpost toilet in Bhagirathpura were constructed above a drinking water pipeline may have allowed sewage to seep into the supply, the toilet had been built without a local septic tank, and the sewage was drained into a pit, which caused the contamination in the nearby drinking water pipeline. The affected water pipeline was subsequently repaired, isolated, and cleaned.

A test report confirmed bacterial contamination in 26 water samples from Indore. Approximately one-third of the samples taken from Bhagirathpura and tested by medical authorities showed evidence of bacterial contamination, according to a report submitted to the Indore Municipal Corporation.

== Reactions ==
Chief Minister Mohan Yadav, during his visit to Bhagirathpura, announced ₹2 lakh in compensation for each family of the deceased due to the contaminated drinking water. Indore district Collector Shivam Verma stated that, following the health crisis, leaks in the 3,000 km (1,900 mi) long water supply network were repaired and normal water supply had resumed.

The Leader of the Opposition in the Lok Sabha, Rahul Gandhi, visited the families of the deceased and also met with those undergoing treatment. He criticised the BJP government for negligence regarding the deaths and illnesses caused by the contaminated water. Rahul Gandhi provided assistance of ₹1 lakh to the families of the deceased, while the Indian National Congress demanded ₹1 crore in compensation for each affected family.

Indian One Day International and Test cricket team captain Shubman Gill arranged for the installation of a water purifier for Team India to ensure safe drinking water for his teammates and support staff during the third and final match of the ongoing series against New Zealand on 18 January 2026.
