= Indore =

Metropolis in Madhya Pradesh, India

Indore Indaura (Hindi)
- Metropolis
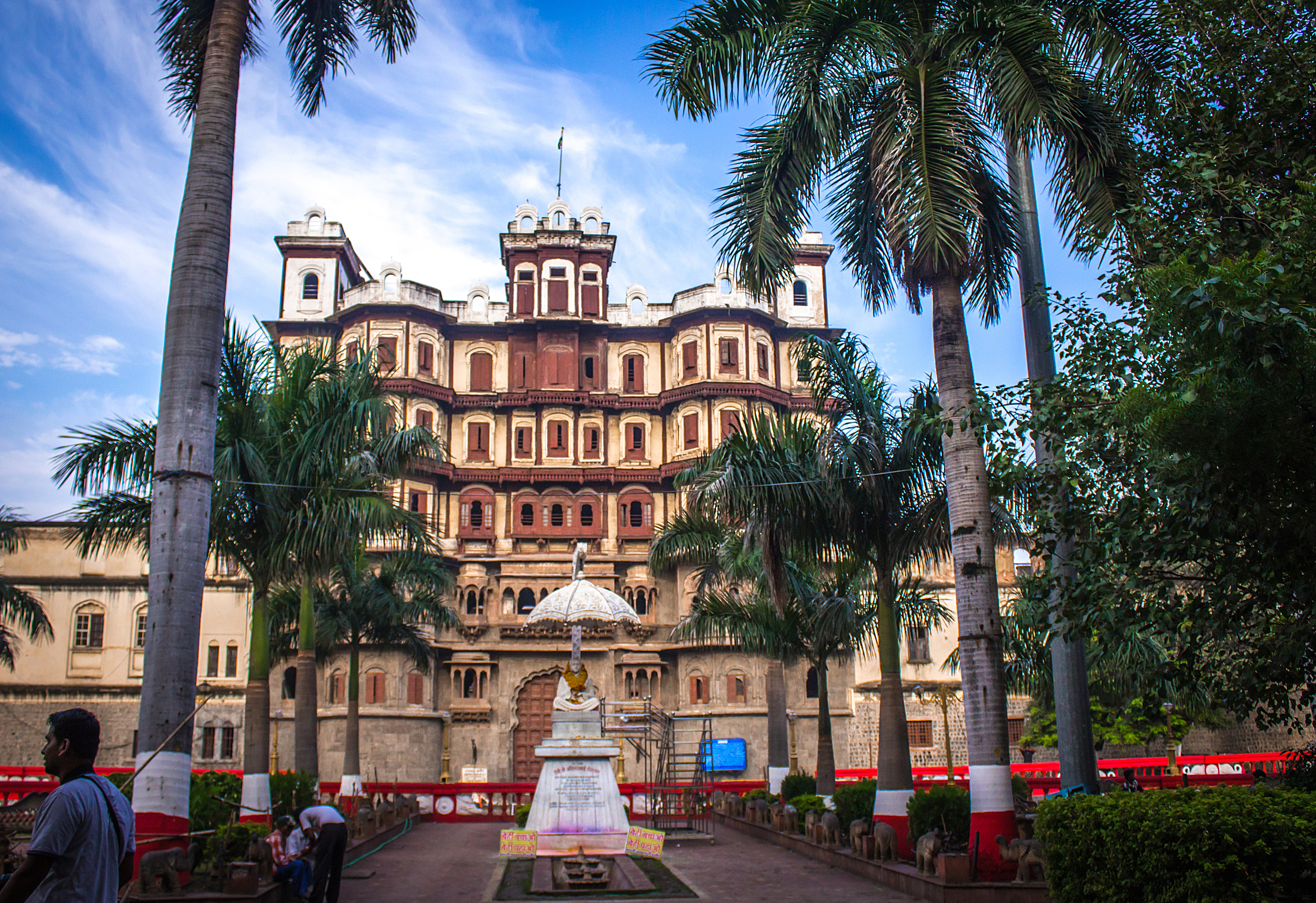
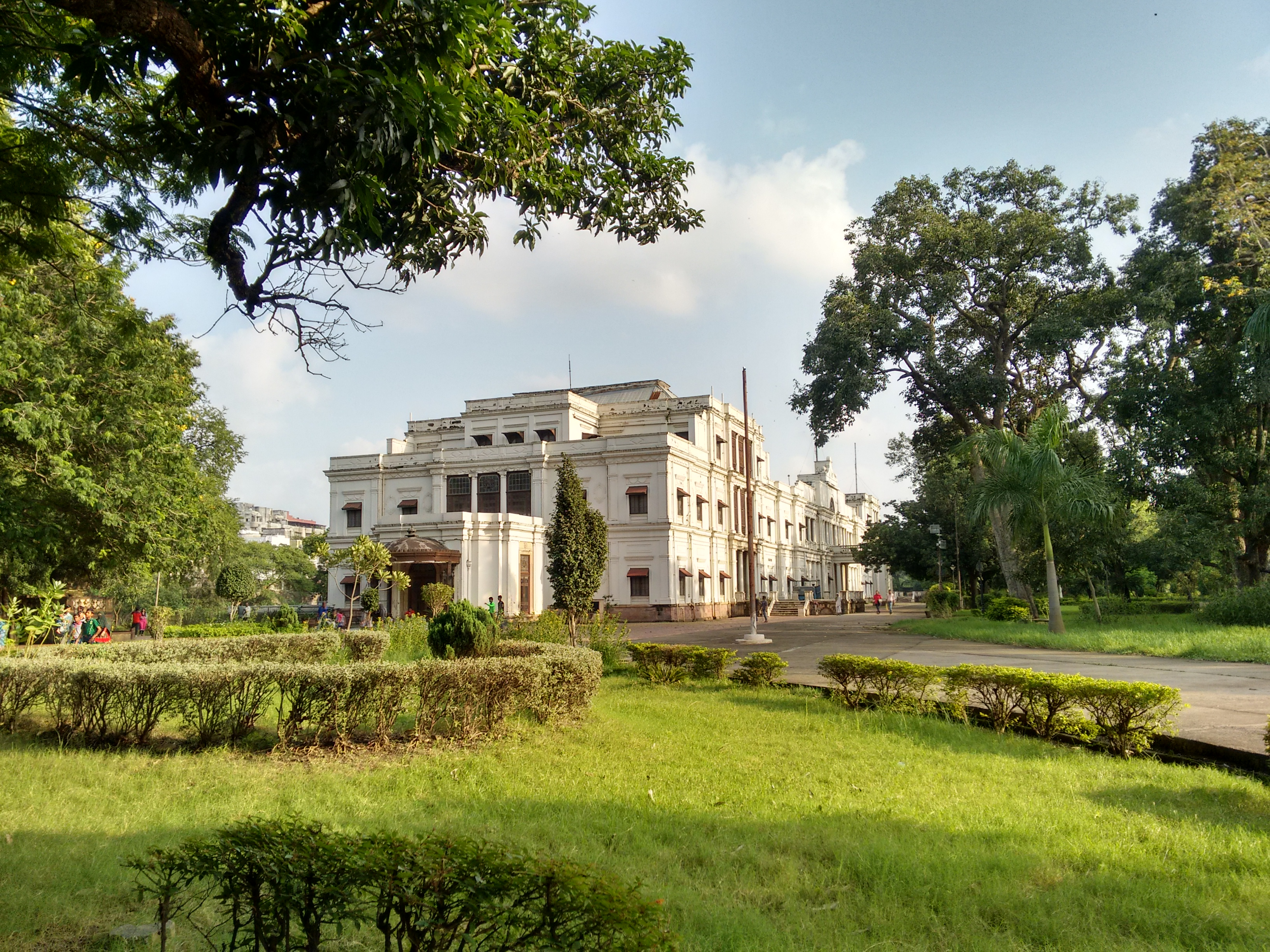
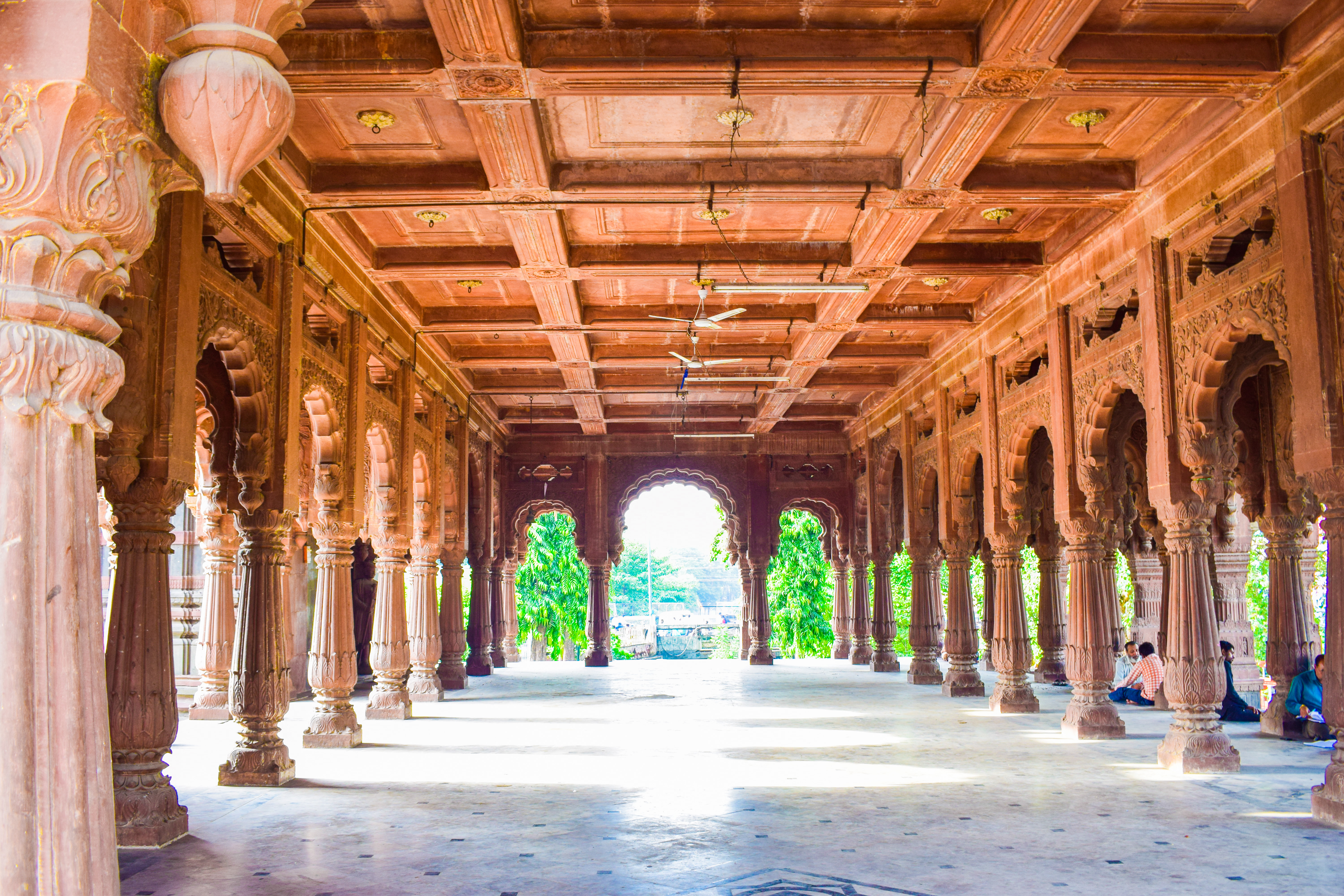
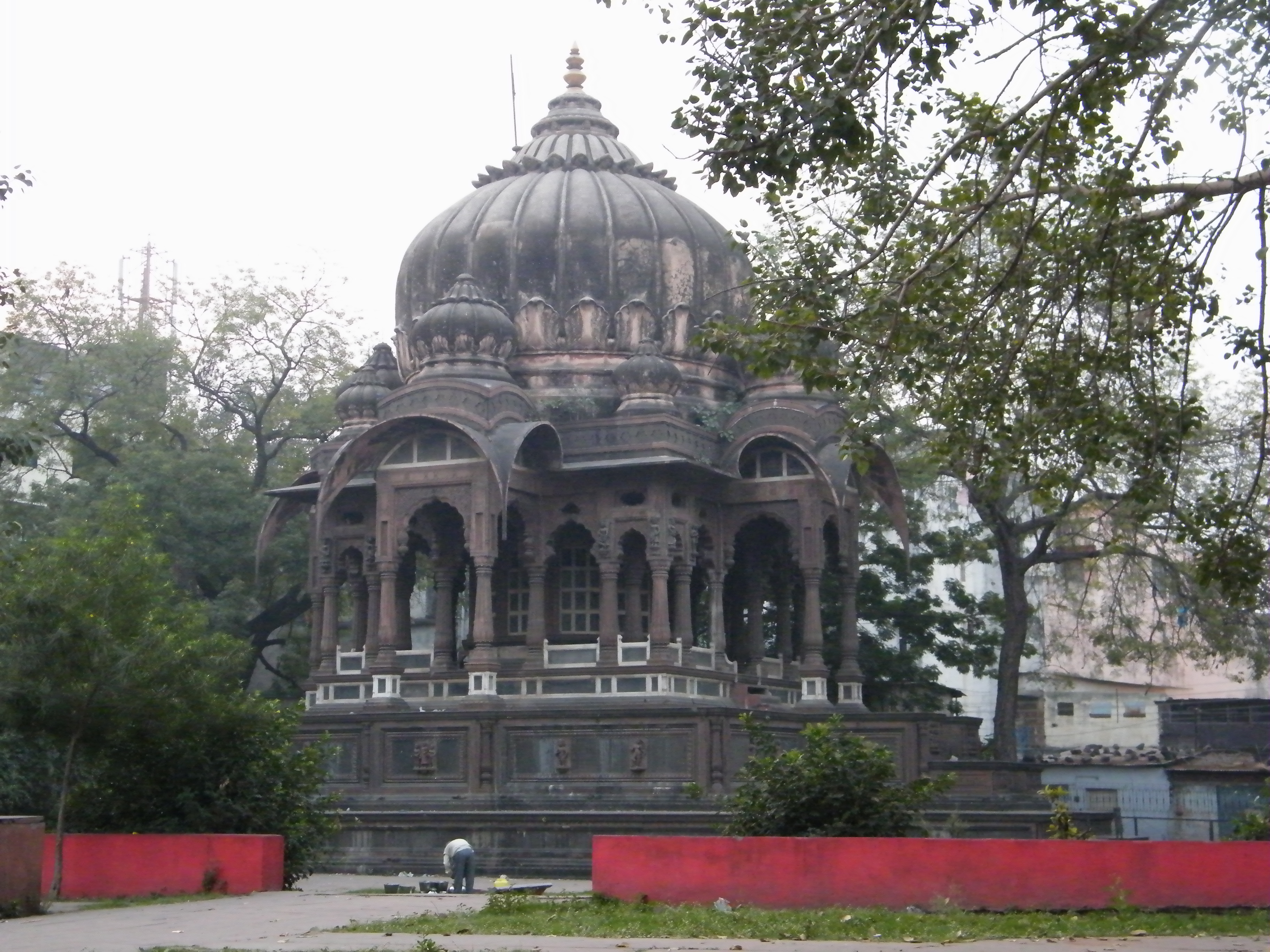
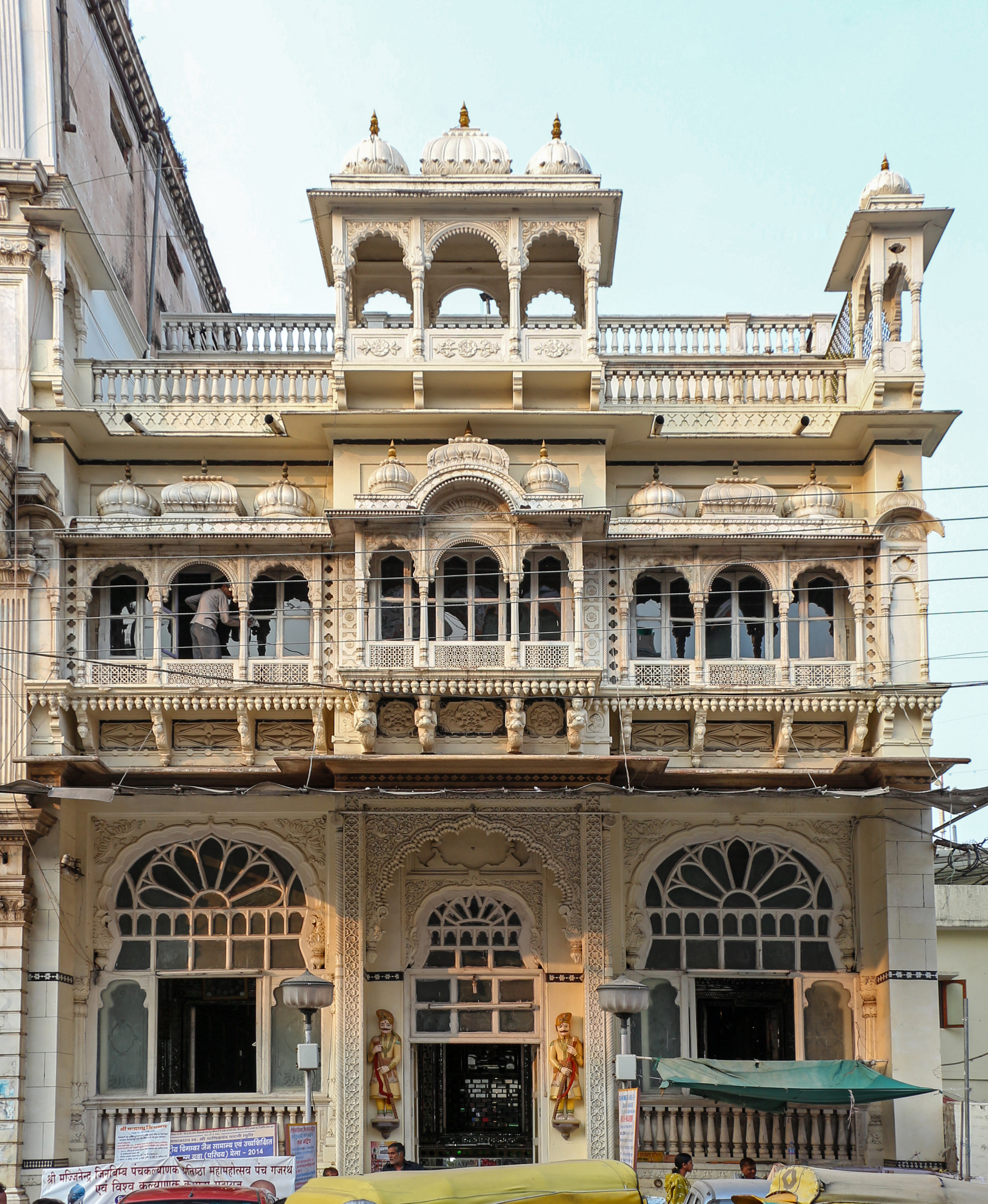
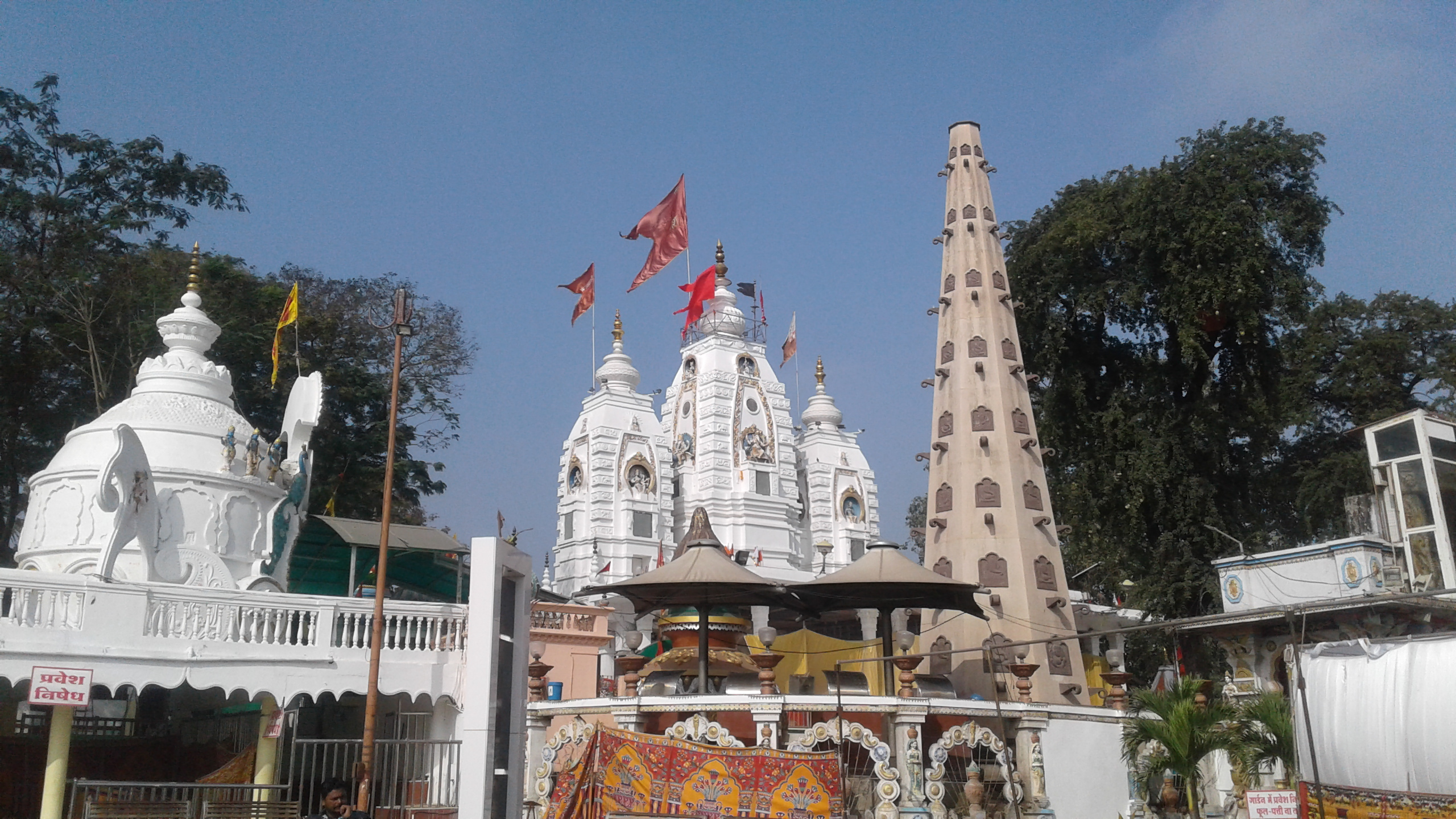
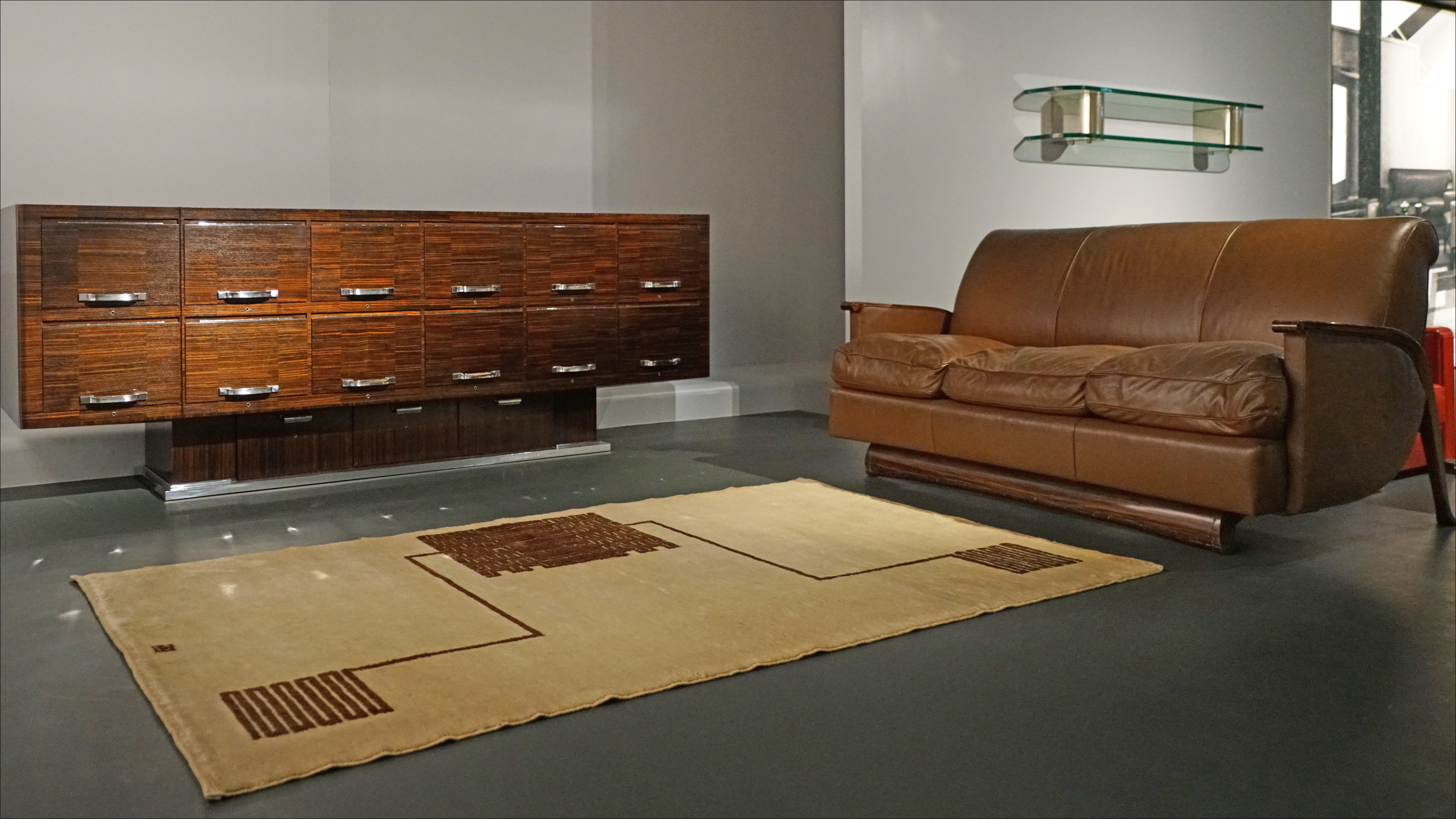
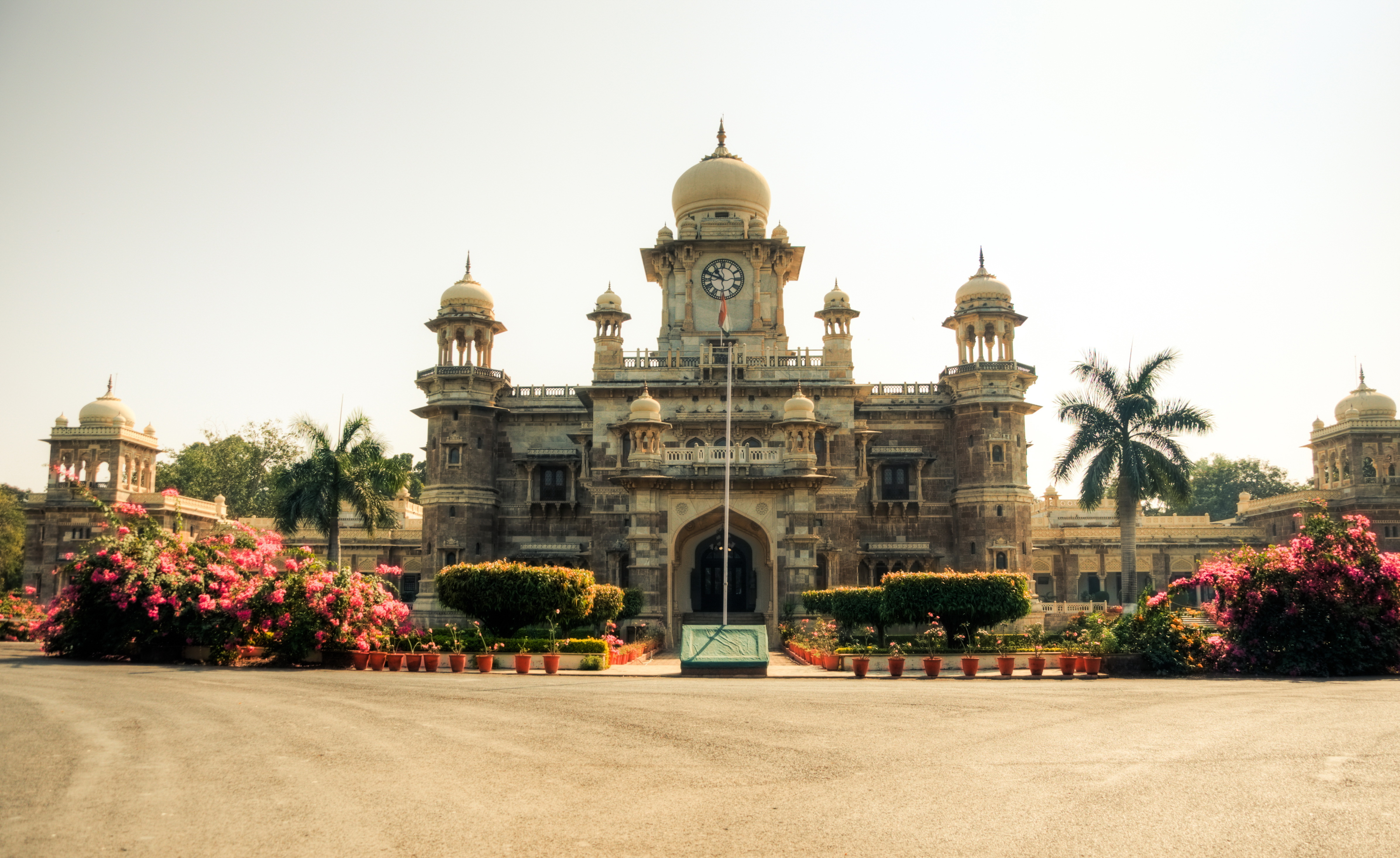
- Rajwada Palace Lalbagh Palace Interior of the Krishnapura Chhatris Chhatri of Bolia Maharaj Kanch Mandir Khajrana Ganesh Temple Art Deco in Manik Bagh Daly College
- Nickname: Street Food Capital of India
- Location of Indore in Madhya Pradesh Indore (India)
- Coordinates: 22°43′7″N 75°51′18″E
- Country: India
- State: Madhya Pradesh
- Region: Malwa
- District: Indore

Government
  - Type: Municipal Corporation
  - Body: Indore Municipal Corporation
  - Mayor: Pushyamitra Bhargav (BJP)

Area
  - Metropolis: 530 km^{2} (200 sq mi)
  - Metro: 1,200 km^{2} (460 sq mi)
  - Rank: 6
- Elevation: 550 m (1,800 ft)

Population (2011)
  - Metropolis: 1,994,397
  - Rank: 14th
  - Density: 3,800/km^{2} (9,700/sq mi)
  - Metro: 2,170,295
  - Metro rank: 15th
- Demonym: Indori
- Time zone: UTC+5:30
- PIN: 4520XX
- Telephone code: 0731
- Vehicle registration: MP-09
- Official language: Hindi
- Railway Station: Indore Junction Railway Station; Laxmibai Nagar railway station
- Rapid Transit: Indore Metro
- Public transport bus service: Atal Indore City Transport Service Limited
- Climate: Cwa / Aw (Köppen)
- Website: imcindore.mp.gov.in, indore.nic.in

Indore (/ɪnˈdɔːr/; ISO: Indaura, Hindi: [ɪn̪d̪ɔːr]) is the largest city of the Indian state of Madhya Pradesh where it serves as the capital and the administrative headquarters of the eponymous district and division. Modern-day Indore was established on the banks of the Kanh and Saraswati rivers and traces its roots to its 16th-century founding as a trading hub between the Deccan Plateau and Delhi. Following the conquest of Malwa by Peshwa Baji Rao I, the city came under the control of the Maratha Empire until its annexation by the British East India Company. Prior to Indian independence, the Kingdom of Indore was a nineteen Gun Salute Princely State of the British Raj with the Holkars as rulers.

With an estimated population of 5.6 million in 2025 distributed over nearly 10 thousand square kilometres, the metropolitan region encompassing Indore, Ujjain, Dewas, Pithampur and Nagda serves as the financial capital of Madhya Pradesh. One of India's main industrial hubs, the metropolitan region is a major center for pharmaceutical and automotive manufacturing with, notably, Asia’s longest test track.

The largest education hub in central India, it is home to an Indian Institute of Technology and an Indian Institute of Management and is one of the cities selected under the central government's flagship Smart Cities Mission and Swachh Survekshan programmes.

Consistently ranked as India's cleanest city, Indore is regularly commended for its clean air and proper waste management.

== Etymology ==
Gupta inscriptions name Indore as "Indrapura". It is believed that the city is named after its Indreshwar Mahadev Temple, where Shiva is the presiding deity. It is believed that Indra himself did Tapasya (meditation) in this place and led sage Swami Indrapuri to establish the temple. Later, Tukoji Rao Holkar who belonged to the Holkar clan of the Marathas and was the feudatory of Indore, renovated the temple. The older name of Indore is believed to be Indur, as referenced in historical records. In 2017, a proposal was brought forward by the Indore Municipal Corporation to rename the city as "Indur".

== History ==
=== Gupta Empire (Gupta era) ===
Gupta Empire inscription mentions Indore as city/town of Indrapura in Gupta Indore Copper plate inscription dated 146 Gupta era or 465 CE. These are also some of the earliest mentions of Indore where the city is mentioned as 'Indrapura'. Indrapura (modern day Indore) was then known for its sun temple, where in 464–65 CE, Gupta king Skandagupta had made an endowment for the permanent maintenance of the city's sun temple. The temple was constructed by two merchants of the city – Achalavarman and Bhṛikuṇṭhasiṁha.

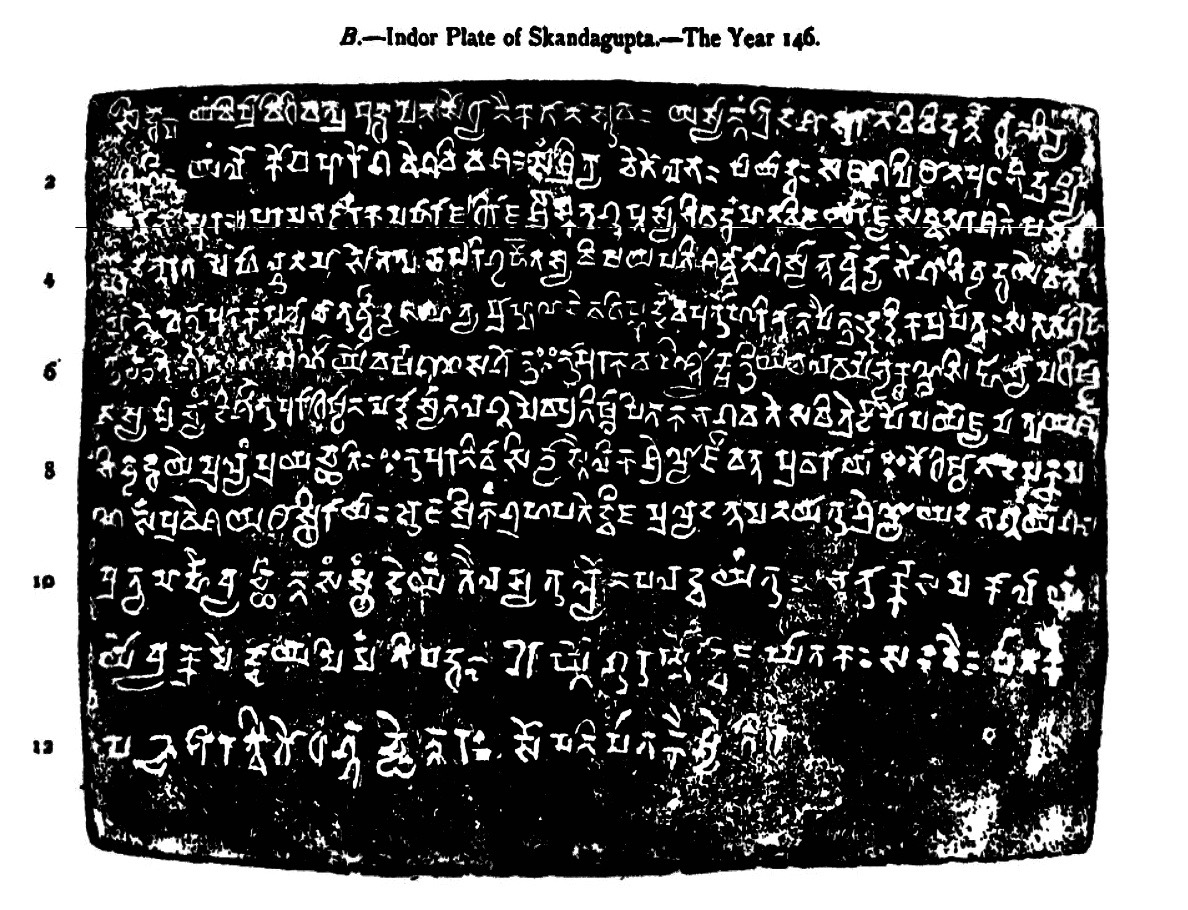
An early Gupta era inscription from ancient India. This is a photograph of a personal copy of plates published by John Fleet in 1888, with Inscriptions of the Early Gupta Kings And Their Successors, as a part of the Corpus Inscriptionum Indicarum series, Vol. 3

=== Holkar era (Maratha Empire) ===
During the Mughal era, the area under the modern Indore district was equally divided between the administrations (sarkars) of Ujjain and Mandu. Kampel was the headquarters of a mahal (administrative unit) under the Ujjain sarkar of Malwa Subah (province). The area of the modern Indore city was included in the Kampel pargana (administrative unit).

In 1715, the Marathas invaded this region (Mughal territory) and demanded chauth (tax) from the Mughal Amil (administrator) of Kampel. The Amil fled to Ujjain, and the local zamindars agreed to pay Chauth to the Marathas. The chief zamindar, Nandlal Chaudhary (later known as Nandlal Mandloi), paid a chauth of around Rs. 25,000 to the Marathas. Jai Singh II, the Mughal Governor of Malwa, reached Kampel on 8 May 1715, and defeated the Marathas in a battle near the village. The Marathas came back in early 1716, and raided Kampel in 1717. In March 1718, the Marathas, led by Santaji Bhonsale, invaded Malwa again, but were unsuccessful this time.

By 1720, the headquarters of the local pargana were transferred from Kampel to Indore, due to the increasing commercial activity in the city. In 1724, the Marathas under the new Peshwa Baji Rao I, launched a fresh attack on the Mughals in Malwa. Baji Rao I himself led the campaign, accompanied by his lieutenants Udaji Rao Pawar, Malhar Rao Holkar and Ranoji Scindia. The Mughal Nizam met the Peshwa at Nalchha on 18 May 1724, and acceded to his demand of collecting chauth from the area. The Peshwa returned to the Deccan, but left Malhar Rao Holkar at Indore to oversee the chauth collection.

The Marathas maintained friendly relations with Nandlal Chaudhary, who held influence over the local Sardars (chiefs). In 1728, they defeated the Mughals decisively in the battle of Amjhera, and consolidated their authority in the area over the next few years. On 3 October 1730, Malhar Rao Holkar was appointed as the Maratha chief of Malwa. The local zamindars, who had the title of Chaudhari, came to be known as Mandlois (after mandal, an administrative unit) during the Maratha reign. The Holkar dynasty of the Marathas, which controlled the region, conferred the title of Rao upon the local zamindar family. After Nandlal died, his son Tejkarana was accepted as the Mandloi of Kampel by the Peshwa Baji Rao I. The pargana was formally granted to Malhar Rao Holkar by merging 28 and one-half Pargana by the Peshwa in 1733. The pargana headquarters were transferred back to Kampel during his reign. After his death, his daughter-in-law Ahilyabai Holkar moved the headquarters to Indore in 1766. The tehsil of Kampel was converted into Indore tehsil by a change in the name. Ahilyabai Holkar moved the state's capital to Maheshwar in 1767, but Indore remained an important commercial and military centre.

=== Princely State (Indore/Holkar State) ===
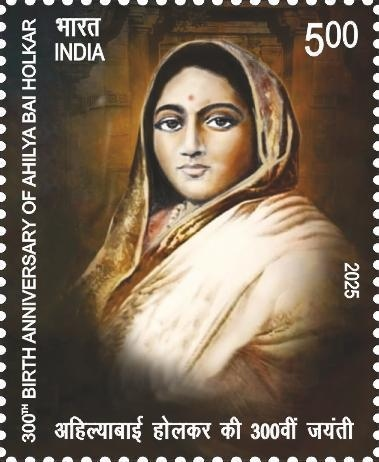
Ahilyabai Holkar on a 2025 stamp of India

Ahalyabai Holkar is fondly remembered as a noble, saintly and courageous woman. She ruled the kingdom of Indore (which was then part of the wider Maratha Empire) for several decades. Her rule is remembered as a golden age in Indore's history. From an agricultural background herself, she married Khande Rao, prince of Indore. Thereafter, she resided in the Royal Palace. Later, she was trained in statecraft and accompanied the army to war on many occasions. At that time the Maratha Empire (which was founded by Chhatrapati Shivaji Raje Bhonsale) was at the apex of its power. There were frequent battles and skirmishes, both against foreigners as well as internal feuds. In one such battle in 1754, Ahalyabai's husband was killed. Her aged father-in-law (Malhar Rao) was shattered at the death of his son. He summoned Ahalyabai, who he loved deeply, and said: "You are now my son. I wish that you look after my kingdom".Malhar Rao Holkar died in 1766, 12 years after the death of his son Khande Rao. Malhar Rao's grandson and Khande Rao's only son Male Rao Holkar became the ruler of Indore in 1766, under Ahilya Bai's regency, but he too died within few months in April 1767. Ahilya Bai became the ruler of Indore after the death of her son with Khande Rao. Ahilya Bai was a great pioneer and builder of Hindu temples who constructed hundreds of temples and Dharmashalas throughout India.

In 1818, the Holkars were defeated by the British during the Third Anglo-Maratha War, in the Battle of Mahidpur by which the capital was again moved from Maheshwar to Indore. A residency with British residents was established at Indore, but Holkars continued to rule Indore State as a princely state mainly due to efforts of their Dewan Tatya Jog. During that time, Indore has established the headquarters of the British Central Agency. Ujjain was originally the commercial centre of Malwa. But the British administrators such as John Malcolm decided to promote Indore as an alternative to Ujjain because the merchants of Ujjain had supported anti-British elements.

In 1906 electric supply was started in the city, the fire brigade was established in 1909, and 1918, the first master-plan of the city was made by noted architect and town planner, Patrick Geddes. During the period of Maharaja Tukoji Rao Holkar II (1852–86) efforts were made for the planned development and industrial development of Indore. With the introduction of Railways in 1875, the business in Indore flourished during the reigns of Maharaja Shivaji Rao Holkar, Maharaja Tukoji Rao Holkar III and Maharaja Yeshwant Rao Holkar.

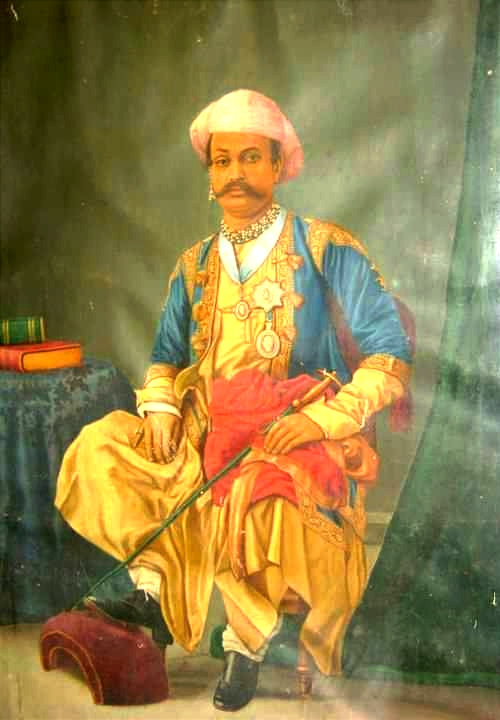
Kashirao (Dada Saheb) Holkar KCSI (Knight Commander of the Order of the Star of India), the elder brother of Maharaja Tukojirao Holkar II, receiving public recognition by the Viceroy, Lord Canning, in open durbar on 14 January 1861

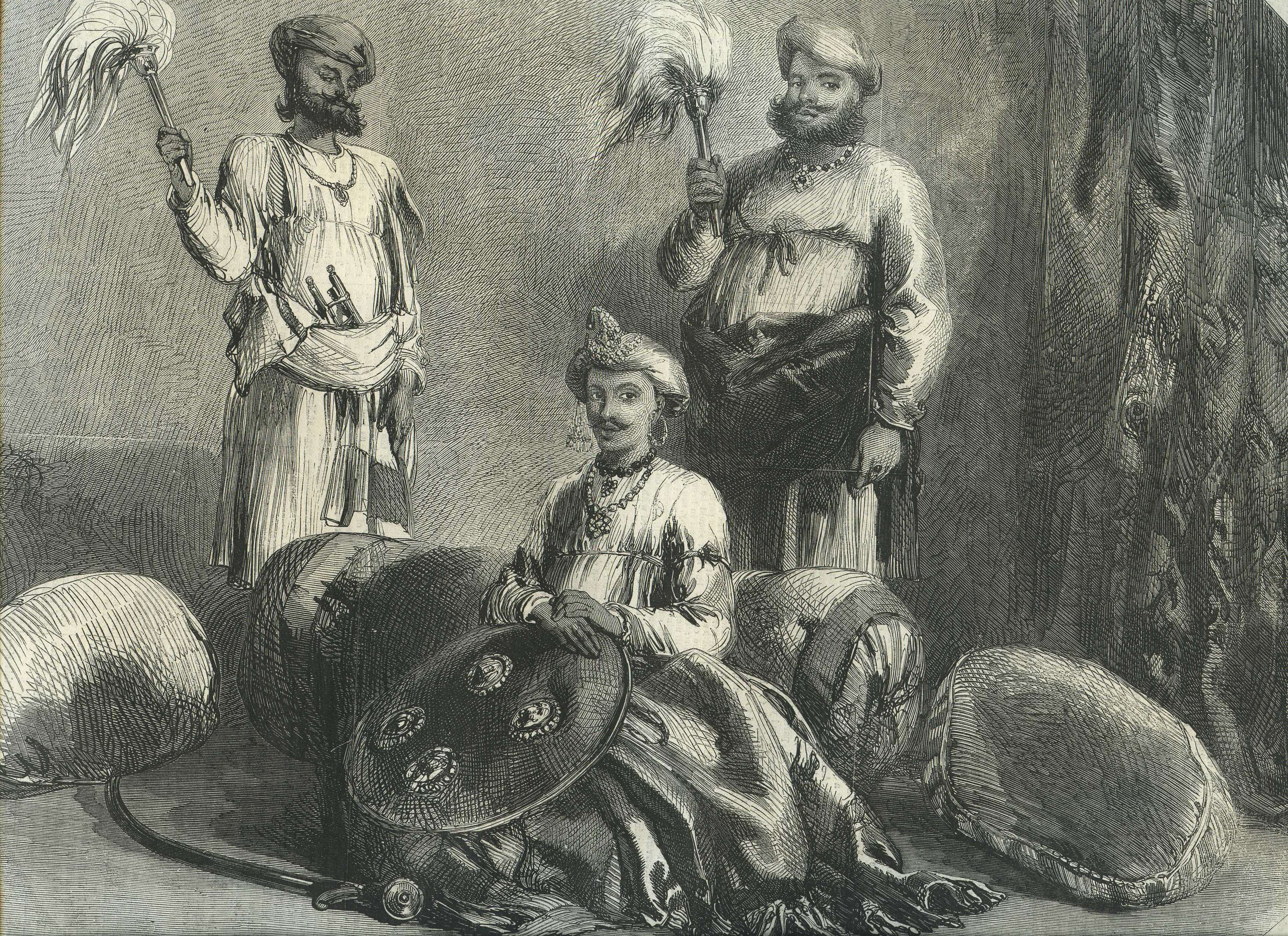
Tukoji Rao Holkar II, Indore, from a drawing by Mr. W. Carpenter, Jun.," from the Illustrated London News, 1857

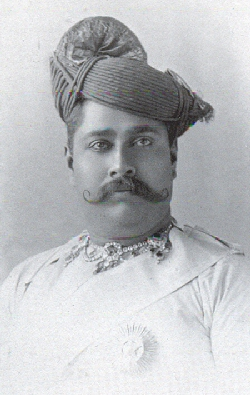
Maharaja Shivaji Rao Holkar of Indore

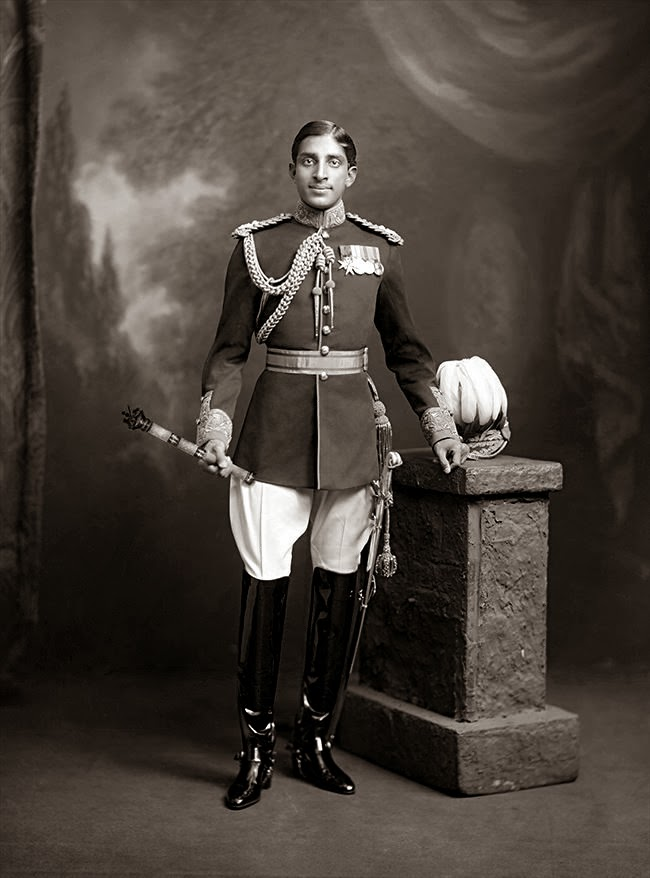
Tukoji Rao Holkar III, The Maharaja of Indore (1890–1978) by James Lauder, London

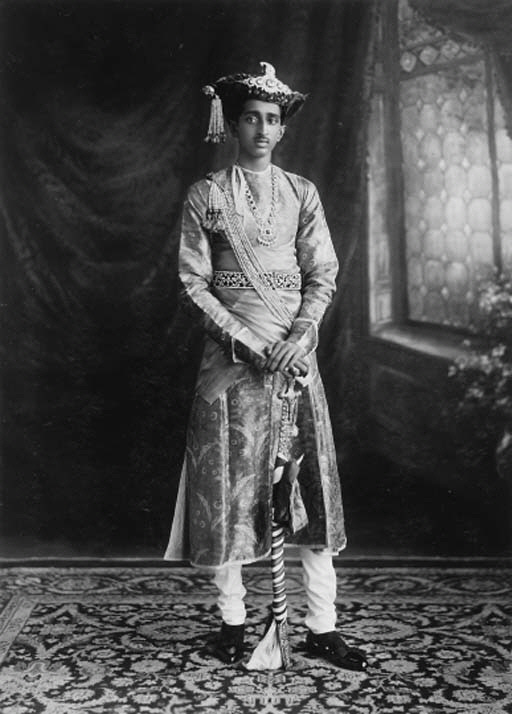
Investiture of His Highness The Maharaja Yeshwant Rao II Holkar Bahadur of Indore 9 May 1930

The Holkar State Darbar (Court) was composed of many Jagirdars, Sardars, Istamuradars, Mankaris and Zamindars.

=== Post-independence ===
After India's independence in 1947, Holkar State, along with several neighbouring princely states, acceded to the Indian Union. On 1 November 1956, when Madhya Bharat was merged into Madhya Pradesh, Indore became part of the newly formed state. Indore a city today of nearly 4.5 million (2018) residents, has been transformed from a traditional commercial urban centre into the modern dynamic commercial capital of the state. In December 2025, a drinking water contamination incident occurred in Bhagirathpura, a neighbourhood of Indore. The incident resulted in the deaths of 21 people, while approximately 1,400 residents experienced gastrointestinal symptoms consistent with a waterborne infection.

== Geography ==
=== Climate ===
Indore lies on a borderline between a tropical savanna climate (Aw) and a humid subtropical climate (Köppen climate classification Cwa). Because of its high elevation the climate is much more moderate compared to the North Indian plains, even during the hottest months the nights are relatively cool, which is known as Shab-e-Malwa. Three distinct seasons are observed: summer, monsoon and winter. The coldest temperature was 1.1 °C (34.0 °F) on 27 December 1936.

Indore gets moderate rainfall of 700 to 800 mm (28 to 31 in) during June–September due to the southwest monsoon.

Climate data for Indore (1991–2020, extremes 1949–present)
Month	Jan	Feb	Mar	Apr	May	Jun	Jul	Aug	Sep	Oct	Nov	Dec	Year
Record high °C (°F)	33.9 (93.0)	37.9 (100.2)	41.1 (106.0)	44.6 (112.3)	46.0 (114.8)	45.8 (114.4)	39.9 (103.8)	35.8 (96.4)	37.4 (99.3)	37.8 (100.0)	37.1 (98.8)	33.0 (91.4)	46.0 (114.8)
Mean daily maximum °C (°F)	26.2 (79.2)	29.4 (84.9)	34.5 (94.1)	38.7 (101.7)	40.4 (104.7)	36.4 (97.5)	30.2 (86.4)	28.6 (83.5)	30.6 (87.1)	32.8 (91.0)	30.4 (86.7)	27.6 (81.7)	32.1 (89.8)
Daily mean °C (°F)	18.3 (64.9)	21.1 (70.0)	25.8 (78.4)	30.0 (86.0)	32.6 (90.7)	30.3 (86.5)	26.5 (79.7)	25.3 (77.5)	25.9 (78.6)	25.6 (78.1)	22.6 (72.7)	19.4 (66.9)	25.3 (77.5)
Mean daily minimum °C (°F)	10.3 (50.5)	12.6 (54.7)	16.9 (62.4)	21.3 (70.3)	24.6 (76.3)	24.4 (75.9)	22.8 (73.0)	22.0 (71.6)	21.1 (70.0)	18.2 (64.8)	14.7 (58.5)	11.4 (52.5)	18.4 (65.1)
Record low °C (°F)	−1.1 (30.0)	−2.8 (27.0)	5.0 (41.0)	7.8 (46.0)	16.7 (62.1)	18.9 (66.0)	18.9 (66.0)	18.6 (65.5)	13.6 (56.5)	6.2 (43.2)	5.6 (42.1)	1.1 (34.0)	−2.8 (27.0)
Average rainfall mm (inches)	7.0 (0.28)	2.4 (0.09)	2.7 (0.11)	3.5 (0.14)	13.4 (0.53)	147.3 (5.80)	310.1 (12.21)	258.1 (10.16)	167.2 (6.58)	28.7 (1.13)	11.0 (0.43)	3.7 (0.15)	955.1 (37.60)
Average rainy days	0.5	0.4	0.4	0.3	1.5	6.7	13.0	12.0	7.7	2.4	0.7	0.2	45.8
Average relative humidity (%) (at 17:30 IST)	37	27	18	15	20	46	72	78	66	40	36	38	41
Average dew point °C (°F)	8 (46)	8 (46)	7 (45)	7 (45)	13 (55)	20 (68)	22 (72)	22 (72)	21 (70)	14 (57)	11 (52)	10 (50)	14 (57)
Mean monthly sunshine hours	289.0	275.6	287.6	305.9	326.9	208.6	104.1	79.9	180.6	270.8	274.0	281.3	2,884.3
Average ultraviolet index	5	7	8	9	9	7	6	6	7	6	6	5	7
Source 1: India Meteorological Department Time and Date (dewpoints, 2005–2015)
Source 2: NOAA (sun 1971–1990) Weather Atlas, Tokyo Climate Center (mean temperatures 1991–2020)

Indore has been ranked 6th best "National Clean Air City" (under Category 1 >10L Population cities) in India.

=== Water bodies ===
Indore is home to several significant water bodies, two of which have achieved international recognition as Ramsar Sites. Currently, while the Narmada River project supplies a significant portion of the city's demand, the presence and conservation of local lakes is deemed essential for mitigating the nightmare of flash floods and ensuring long-term water security.

== Demographics ==
Indore is the most populous city in Madhya Pradesh. It is also the largest metropolitan city in Central India. According to the 2011 census of India, the population of Indore city (the area under the municipal corporation and outgrowths) was 1,994,397. The population of the Indore metropolis (urban agglomeration that includes neighbouring areas) was 2,170,295. In 2011, the city had a population density of 25,170 people per square mile (9,718 per square km), rendering it the most densely populated of all the municipalities with population over 100,000 in Madhya Pradesh. As per the 2011 census, 1,502,775 were literates, which translates to 75.4% of the total population, with an effective literacy rate (of population 7 years and above) 85.5%, with male literacy of 89.8% and female literacy was 81.2%. The Scheduled Castes and Scheduled Tribes populations in 2011 were 309,229 and 54,075, respectively. The total number of households were 404711.

According to the 2011 census of India, the population of Indore city (the area under the municipal corporation and outgrowths) was 1,994,397. As per estimates, the population in 2025 is approximately 3,482,830.

=== Religion ===
Religion in Indore City (2011)
Religion	Percent
Hinduism	80.18%
Islam	14.09%
Jainism	3.25%
Sikhism	1.09%
Christianity	0.65%
Buddhism	0.51%
Other or not stated	0.24%

As of 2011, the majority of the population are Hindus (80.18%), followed by significant populations of Muslims (14.09%) and Jains (3.25%).

=== Languages ===
Languages of Indore city (2011)
1. Hindi (81.1%)
2. Marathi (5.19%)
3. Urdu (4.09%)
4. Sindhi (2.73%)
5. Malvi (1.41%)
6. Gujarati (1.22%)
7. Nimadi (1.22%)
8. Punjabi (1.15%)
9. Others (1.93%)

Hindi is the official language of Indore city, it is spoken by over 80% of the population as their first language. A number of Hindi dialects such as Malvi, Nimadi and Bundeli are spoken in decent numbers by migrants from rural areas.

Of non-Hindi languages, the Marathi community has a sizeable presence (5%) from Maratha rule. Urdu is mostly spoken by the Muslim community. Sindhis, who are mostly traders, came as Partition refugees while the Gujaratis form a trading community. There is a small Punjabi Sikh community as well.

According to 2012 figures, around 6,000 Pakistani Hindu migrants live in the city (out of a total 10,000 in the state).

== Government and politics ==
=== Civic administration ===
Indore has a city government, or municipality, with a mayor-council form of government. In 1870, the first municipality was constituted in Indore. Bakshi Khuman Singh (Commander In Chief) of Holkar State Army was appointed as chairman. Indore municipality became the first city to have an elected municipal government responsible for the welfare and growth of the city. In 1956, during the reorganisation of states, Indore was included in Madhya Pradesh, and later that same year, was declared a municipal corporation.

Indore Municipal Corporation (IMC) is spread over an area of 269 square km. The Indore Municipal Corporation (IMC) is a unicameral body consisting of 69 Council members whose districts are divided into 12 zones and these zones had been further divided into 69 wards defined by geographic population boundaries. In 2014, 29 villages were added into the fold of the municipality. In 2015, 23 more villages were added. After these inclusions, the number of wards went up to 85, and zones 19.

The mayor and councillors are elected to five-year terms. The municipal or local elections to Indore Municipal Corporation were last held in 2015. The next elections were to be held early in 2020, but as per a report from February 2020, these have not happened, although preparation of voter rolls and ward reservation happened later in July. The elected wing of the city government is headed by the Mayor and the incumbent Mayor is Pushya Mitra Bhargava. As per a report from the Free Press Journal, Indore was notified in 2018 for not having constituted ward committees. The executive wing is headed by Pratibha Pal, the municipal commissioner of Indore, who is also the first female commissioner of the city.

On 8 May 2020, the budget for of ₹ 4,763 crore for 2020–21 was approved for the civic body. Major sources of revenue for the municipality include collection of property tax, water tax, rent.

Indore municipality follows the guidelines as per the Madhya Pradesh Municipal Corporations Act 1956, as well as the Madhya Pradesh Municipalities Act, 1961. The IMC is responsible for public education, correctional institutions, libraries, public safety, recreational facilities, sanitation, water supply, local planning, and welfare services.

=== Municipal finance ===
As per audited financial statements published on the CityFinance Portal, maintained by the Ministry of Housing and Urban Affairs, the Corporation reported total revenue receipts of ₹1,892 crore and total expenditure of ₹1,916 crore in 2022–23. The Corporation’s own-source revenue accounted for about half of its total receipts.

Composition of revenue receipts, Indore Municipal Corporation (FY 2022–23)
1. Own source revenue (50.1%)
2. Assigned revenue (34.7%)
3. Revenue grants (15.3%)

Note: Indore's total debt increased from ₹579 crore in 2021–22 to ₹760 crore in 2022–23, while its capital expenditure rose to 17.7% of total expenditure, reflecting improved investment spending.

All figures are in crore rupees (₹ Cr)

Year	Total tax revenue	Total own revenue	Assigned revenue	Total grant	Total revenue	Total expenditure	Total balance sheet size
2022–23	596	929	656	289	1,892	1,620	7,964
2021–22	511	881	647	263	1,807	1,418	7,310
2020–21	488	725	554	270	1,565	1,225	6,784
2019–20	567	824	–	247	1,675	1,337	5,949
2018–19	481	756	–	215	1,685	1,328	5,342
2017–18	455	689	–	179	1,516	1,153	4,313
2016–17	443	587	–	147	1,283	980	3,790
2015–16	337	414	–	348	1,303	551	3,427

Source: Data submitted by the Indore Municipal Corporation and available under the Balance Sheet and Income Statement sections on the CityFinance portal of the Ministry of Housing and Urban Affairs.

=== Representation in the parliament and state assembly ===
Indore city is represented in the parliament through the Indore Lok Sabha constituency, which covers most of the district. In May 2019, Shankar Lalwani of Bharatiya Janata Party, who is also the chairman of the Indore Development Authority, had been elected as the Member of Parliament from Indore. As per delimitation from 2008, Indore city is represented in the state assembly constituency through 5 Constituencies, election for which last took place in 2018:

Constituency	Member of Legislative Assembly	Political party	Ref
Indore 1	Kailash Vijayvargiya	Bharatiya Janata Party	
Indore 2	Ramesh Mendola	Bharatiya Janata Party	
Indore 3	Rakesh Shukla	Bharatiya Janata Party	
Indore 4	Malini Gaur	Bharatiya Janata Party	
Indore 5	Mahendra Hardia	Bharatiya Janata Party	

=== Law and order ===
The Indore Police, a division of the Madhya Pradesh Police, is under the direct control of Department of Home Affairs. The government of Madhya Pradesh is the law enforcement agency in Indore. Indore district is divided into 39 police stations and seven police outposts.

In 2012, it was reported that the Police Commissionerate system would be implemented in Indore, but this did not pan out because of tussle between the IAS and IPS officers in the state. The bill was proposed again in 2018 and has been criticised by NewsClick. The system has not been implemented as of 2020, although there has been talk of it.

As of 4 September 2013, the Divisional commissioner is Dr Pawan Kumar Sharma. In Feb 2020, the new Director General of Police became Vivek Johri while SSP Indore is Harinarayan Chari Mishra.

=== Judiciary ===
Indore is also a seat for one of the two permanent benches of Madhya Pradesh High Court with Gwalior, the city, its agglomerates, and other 12 districts of western Madhya Pradesh falls under the jurisdiction of Indore High Court.

=== Other agencies ===
Most of the regions surrounding the city are administered by the Indore Development Authority (IDA). IDA works as an apex body for planning and co-ordination of development activities in the Indore Metropolitan Region (IMR) comprising Indore and its agglomeration covering an area of 398.72 km^{2} (153.95 sq mi). Primarily, IDA develops new residential areas. During the early stage of development of such areas, the IDA is responsible for developing basic infrastructure. Once a sizeable number of plots are sold, the area is formally transferred to the IMC, which is then responsible for the maintenance of the infrastructure in the area.

The IDA consists of two appointed components; the collector of the district, who has executive powers, and the IDA Board which includes a chairman appointed by Government of Madhya Pradesh, Municipal Commissioner of Indore and five members form Town and Country Planning Department, Forest Department, Public Health Engineering, Public Works Department and MP Electricity Board who scrutinise the collector's decisions and can accept or reject his budget proposals each year. The role of IDA is to implement the master plan for Indore prepared by the Town and Country Office, Bhopal. The headquarters of the IDA is at Race Course Road, Indore.

== Civic utilities ==
Electricity in Indore is supplied by the Madhya Pradesh Paschim Kshetra Vidyut Vitaran Company Limited, the state's agency.

Major source of water in Indore are Narmada River and overhead tanks. In 2016, the central government sanctioned 70 crores under the AMRUT scheme to overhaul the water facilities. Indore used to receive 350 MLD of water from Jalud pumping station on Narmada river; while in 2019 the quantity reduced by 100 MLD, as of 2020 it has regained its capacity. The municipality supplies around 450 MLD water through piped connections to parts of the town on alternate days, other parts of the city have shortage of water. The urban poor and unauthorised slum area face a massive shortage of water, and need to purchases private water in drums, or need to have to access private tubewells. A joint study done by UN Habitat, IMC and WaterAid mapping poverty surveyed 176545 households (approximately 1/3rd of the households in the city), and found that 72% of the households did not have access to piped water supply.

As of 2012, Indore generated nearly 240 MLD of sewage. As per a report from August 2018, Indore achieved 100% treatment of the faecal matter generated in the city. The city has three sewage treatment plants (STPs), which includes a sequencing batch reactor with a capacity of 245 MLD, the largest in the world, as well as a 78 MLD and 12 MLD Upflow anaerobic sludge blanket digestion at Kabitkhedi and a third with a capacity of 122 MLD.

As of 2019, Indore generates over 1,115 metric tons (MT) of garbage a day, of which 650 MT is wet waste and 465 MT is dry waste. The municipality has 100% door to door collection and segregation. The city has a Centralized Processing Unit situated at Devguradia, Nemawar Road over an area of 146 acres. Waste collected at the garbage transfer stations in city is weighed, compressed and moved to this site for final processing. Indore set up a Plastic Collection Centre (PCC) to reuse and recycle the city's plastic waste and installed a plastic cleansing machine known as a 'Phatka Machine'.

== Economy ==
Indore is a commercial centre for goods and services. As per the official records released by the Directorate of Economics and Statistics (Madhya Pradesh), the GDP (nominal) of Indore District is estimated at Rs. 64,813 crores for the year 2020–21. While its per-capita nominal GDP was recorded at INR 1,51,101 in 2020–21. The city also hosts a biennial global investors' summit, which attracts investors from several countries. Major industrial areas surrounding the city include Pithampur (phases I, II and III alone host 1,500 large, medium and small industrial set-ups), Indore Special Economic Zone (around 3,000 acres/ 4.7 square miles/ 1,214 hectares), Industrial Area at Dewas I, II & III (around 745 acres/ 1.15 square miles/ 300 hectares) is in the close proximity to Indore (around 35 km), on NH-3 section between Agra- Bombay Road. Sanwer industrial belt (1,000 acres/ 1.6 square miles/ 405 hectares), Laxmibainagar Industrial Area, Rau Industrial Area, Bhagirathpura Industrial Area, Kali Billod Industrial Area, Ranmal Billod Industrial Area, Shivajinagar Bhindikho Industrial Area, Hatod Industrial Area.

The city also has IT Parks, Crystal IT Park (550,000 square feet), Pardeshipura IT Park (100,000 square feet), Electronic Complex, and Individual Special Economic Zones (SEZs) such as TCS SEZ, Infosys SEZ, Impetus SEZ, Diamond Park, Gems and Jewelry Park, Food Park, Apparel Park, Namkeen Cluster and Pharma Cluster.

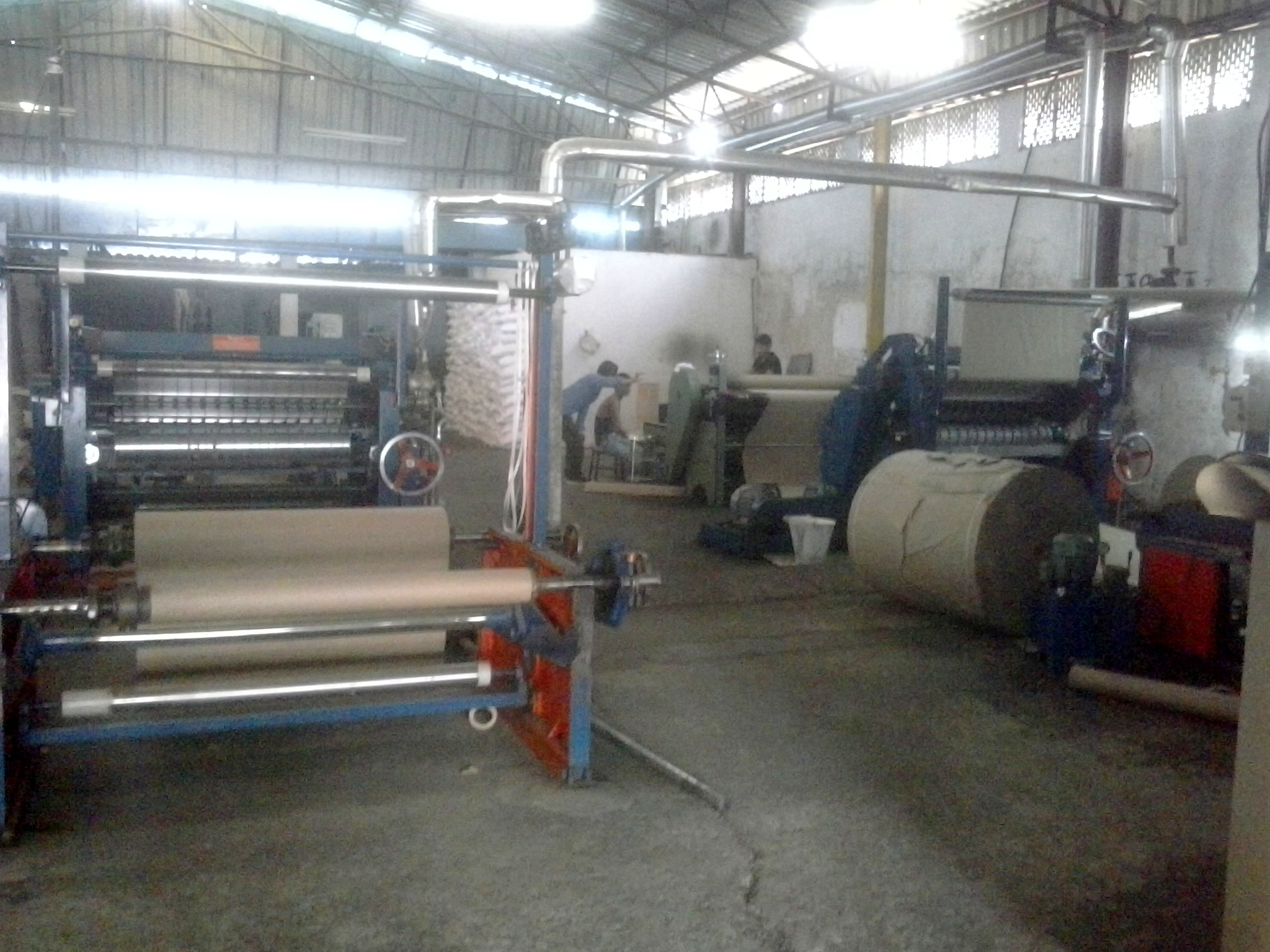
Manufacturing of corrugated paper

Pithampur near Indore is known as the Detroit of Madhya Pradesh.

Madhya Pradesh Stock Exchange (MPSE) was set up in 1919. It is the only stock exchange in Central India and the third oldest stock exchange in India. It is located in Indore. The National Stock Exchange (NSE) has established an Investor Service Centre in the city.

TCS has officially started an offshore development centre in Indore with a total campus area of around 1.5 million square feet. Collabera has also announced plans to open campuses in Indore. Infosys is setting up a new development centre at Indore at an investment of ₹1 billion in Phase I at Super Corridor. Infosys demanded an area of 130 acres (53 hectares) to open its new facility in Indore which will employ about 13,000 people. The government of MP has done the land allotment. Impetus, headquartered in Los Gatos, California, United States, with multiple offshore offices in Indore, has started operations at its 25-acre land, procured from the SEZ. Besides these, there are several small and medium-sized software development firms in Indore. Webgility, a San Francisco-based ecommerce company that has had a presence in Indore since 2007, opened a 16,000 square-foot campus at NRK Business Park in 2017. Accenture has also opened the office in Vijay Nagar area. Nagarro and Persistent Systems also had the presence in Indore.

Pinnacle Industries has an EV manufacturing unit at Indore.

== Culture ==
=== Food ===
Indore's culinary culture has a blend of Maharashtrian, Malwi, Rajasthani and Gujarati influence. The street food of the city is especially popular. Two of the most noteworthy street food places in Indore are Chappan Dukan and Sarafa Bazaar.

As part of the Smart City project, the Chappan Dukan area has been developed as a smart food street. The cost of this project is ₹ 40 million and has been implemented in a 45-day period.

Sarafa Bazaar, which is India's only night street-food market, attracts large crowds from the city and tourists from various places.

Indore is also notable for its wide variety of namkeens or savoury items and has many popular namkeen stores across the city. Most popular food items of Indore include poha, kachori, samosa, jalebi, gulab jamun, rabdi, gajak, imarti, bhel, pani puri, hot dog, egg banjo, moong bhajiya, moong daal halwa, dahi wada, sabudana khichri, sabudana wada, dhokla, jeeravan, and sev.

The city is debatably the most vegetarian city in India; nearly 49% of population is vegetarian at some level.

=== Entertainment ===
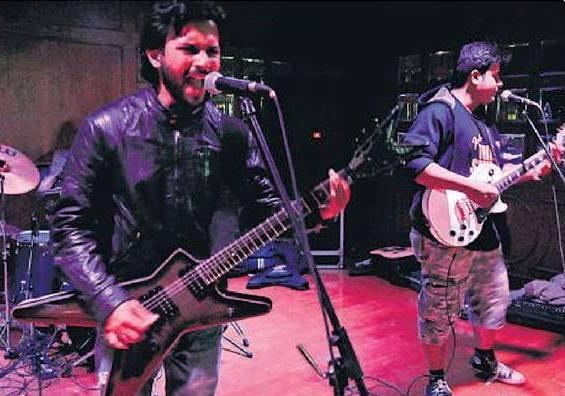
Nicotine playing at 'Pedal to the Metal', TDS, Indore, in 2014

The Yeshwant Club (named after the late Maharaja Yeshwant Rao II Holkar of Indore) and Sayaji Club/Hotel (named after Late the Maharaja Sayaji Rao III Gaekwad of Baroda) are big sponsors for art & music, and invite talents from across the world. The major art centres in Indore are the Devlalikar Kala Vithika, Ravindra Natya Grah (RNG), Mai Mangeshkar Sabha Grah, Anand Mohan Mathur Sabhagrah, DAVV auditorium, and Brilliant Convention Centre.

The city has a good rock/metal music culture which is growing. Nicotine, one of the city's earliest and most renowned bands, is widely known for being the pioneer of metal music in Central India.

=== Festivals ===
Rang Panchami is one of the most vibrant festivals celebrated in Indore, marked by a grand procession known as the "Ger". Unlike the Holi festival celebrated across India, Rang Panchami in Indore has a distinct cultural identity. Thousands gather in the old city area as traditional music, dancing, and colour-throwing fill the streets. Organised by local groups and supported by the municipal corporation, the event includes decorated trucks, DJs, and water cannons spraying coloured water. The celebration showcases Indore’s unique blend of tradition and modernity.

== Transport ==
=== Air ===
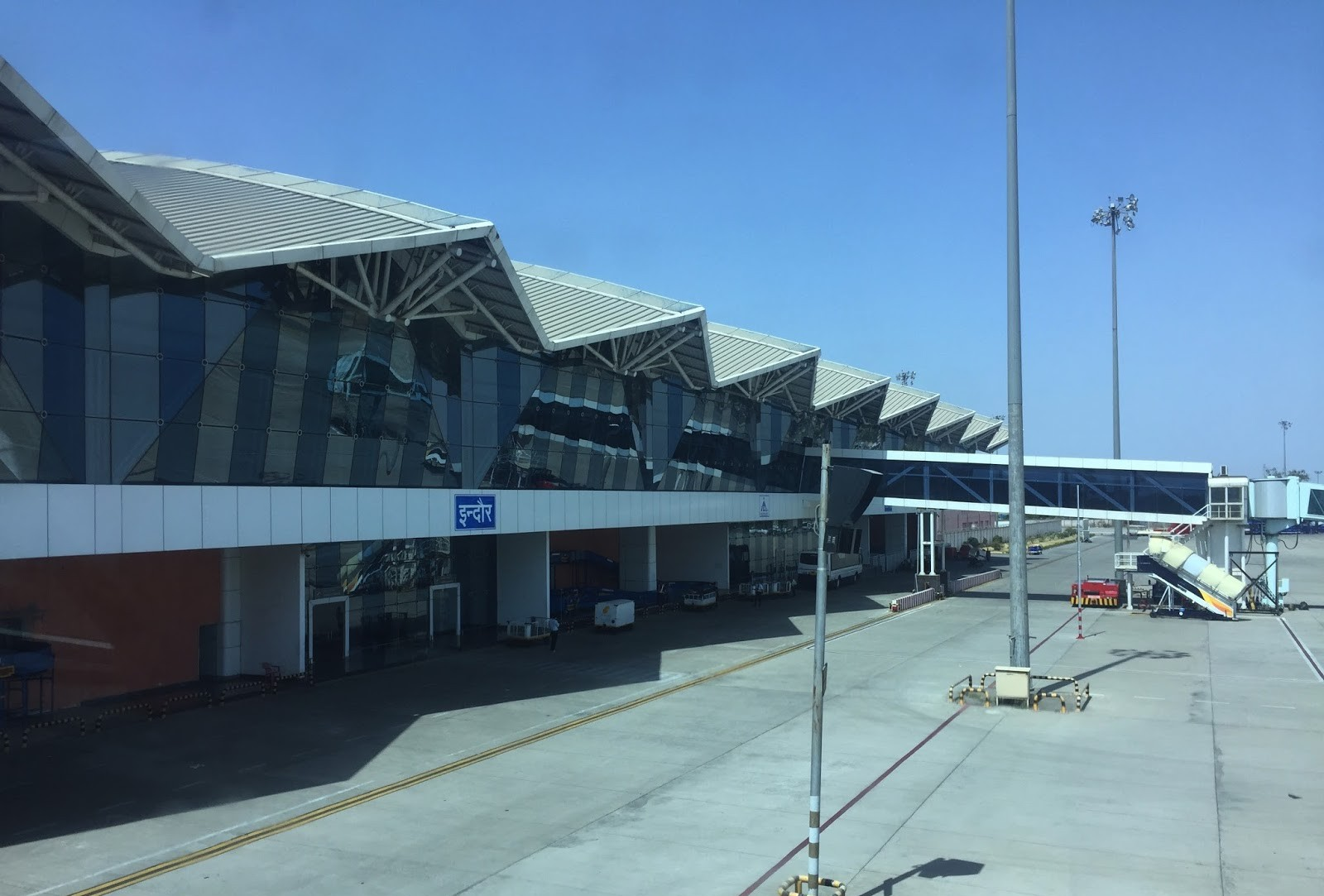
Devi Ahilyabai Holkar International Airport

Indore is served by Devi Ahilyabai Holkar International Airport, about 8 km (5.0 mi) from the city. It is the busiest airport in the state of Madhya Pradesh with 2,828,971 passengers and 10,851 tonnes of cargo for April 2022–March 2023. Devi Ahilyabai Holkar International Airport, Indore has been adjudged as the best airport in the under-2-million-annual-passenger-footfall category in the Asia-Pacific region in the Airports Council International (ACI)'s airport service quality (ASQ) rankings for 2017.

=== Rail ===
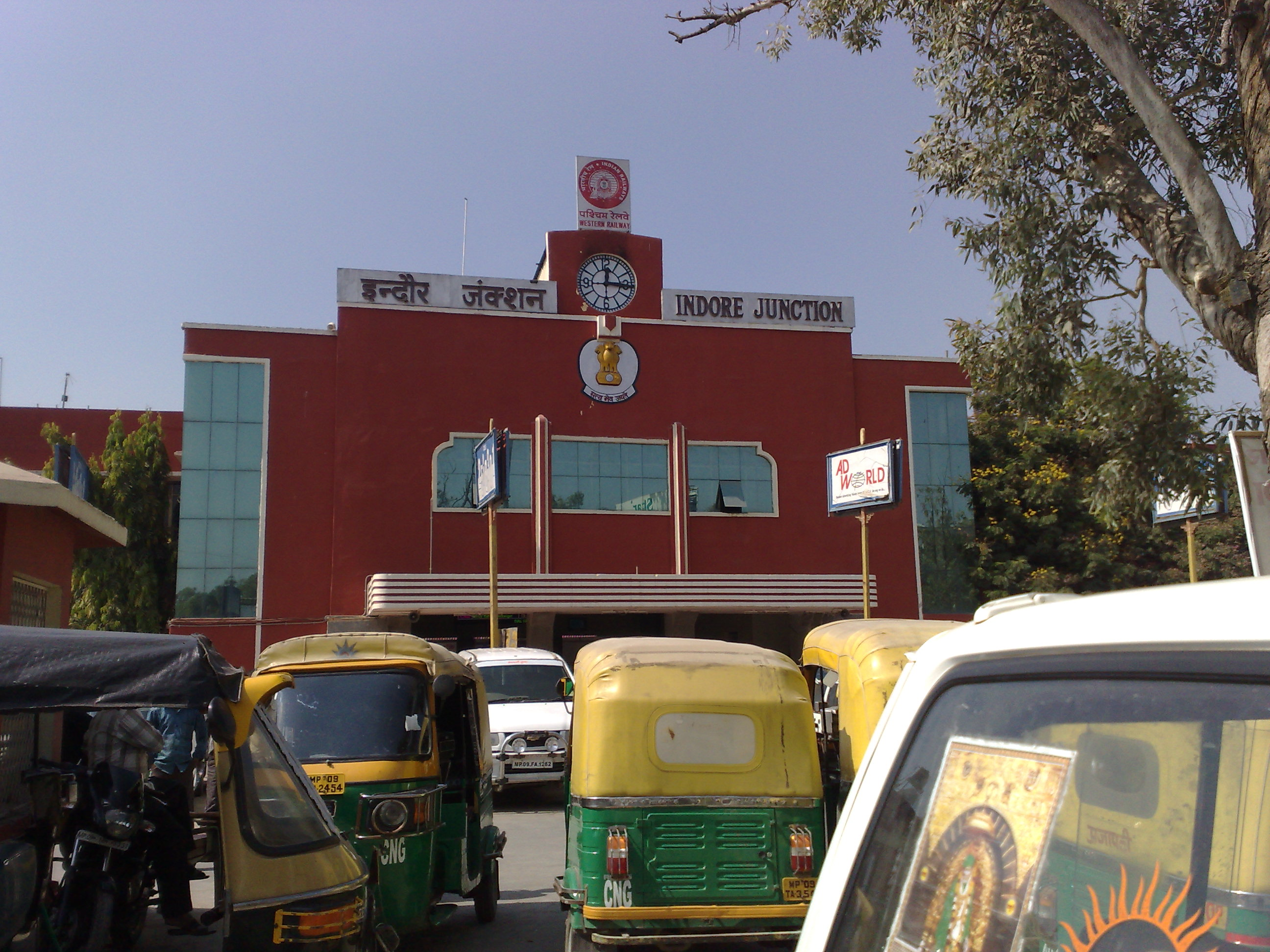
The Indore Junction eastern entrance

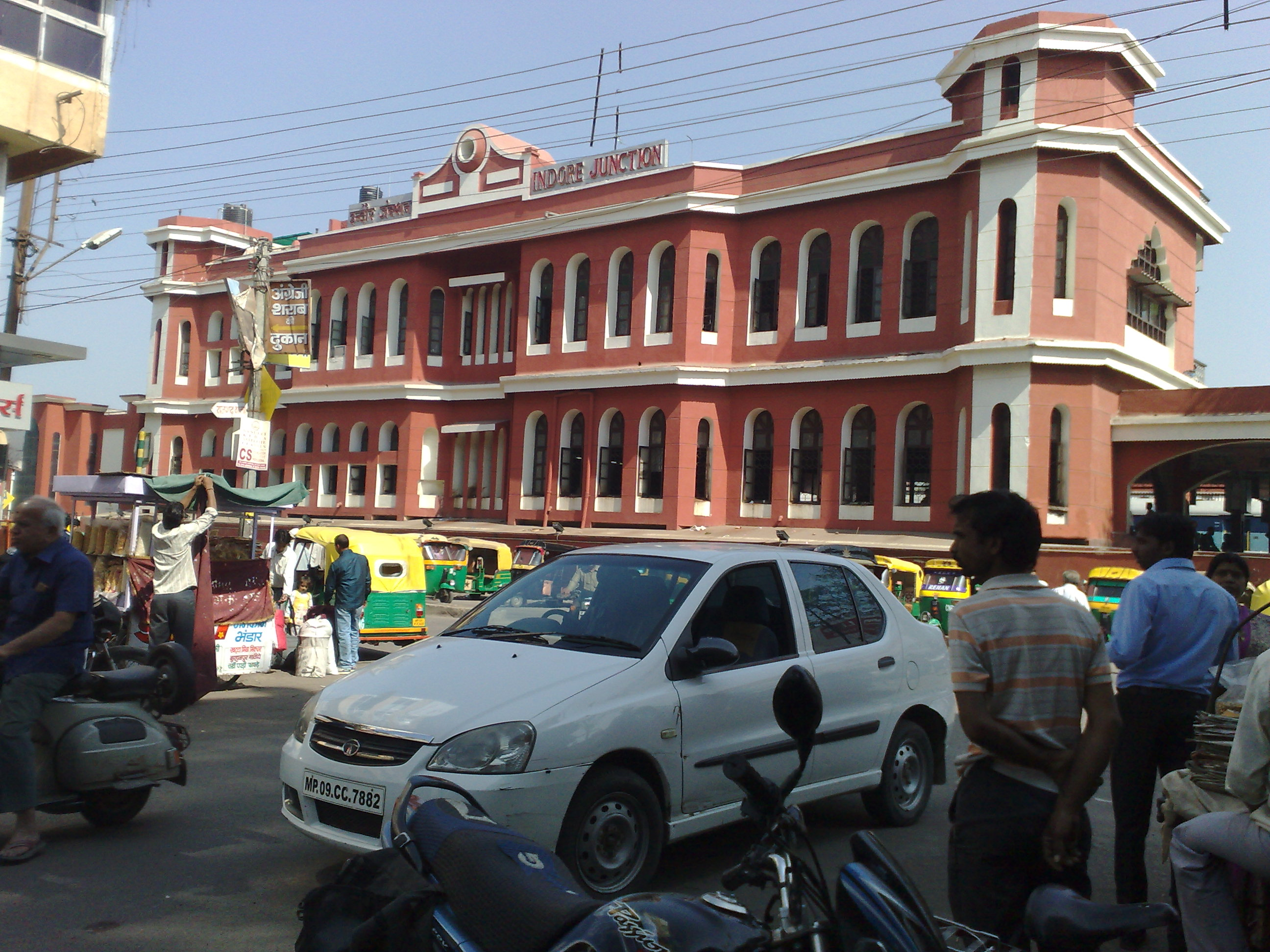
The Indore Junction western entrance

The Indore Junction is an A-1 grade railway station with a revenue of more than Rs. 500 million. The station comes under Ratlam Division of the Western Railways. It is situated between Ujjain and Dewas Junctions on the Indore-Gwalior Broad Gauge Railway Line.

Electrification of the Indore–Dewas–Ujjain was completed in June 2012. Ratlam–Indore broad gauge conversion was completed in September 2014. Indore–Mhow section was upgraded to broad gauge in 2016 and electrified in 2017.

The city of Indore has eight railway stations in addition to the main Indore Junction:

Station name	Station code	Railway zone	Total platforms
Lakshmibai Nagar	LMNR	Western Railway	3
Saify Nagar	SFNR	Western Railway	1
Lokmanya Nagar	LMNR	Western Railway	1
Rajendra Nagar	RJNR	Western Railway	2
Manglia Gaon	MGG	Western Railway	3
Rau	RAU	Western Railway	2
Haranya Kheri	HKH	Western Railway	2
Dr. Ambedkar Nagar	DADN	Western Railway	3
Patalpani	PTP	Western Railway	3

=== Road ===
Indore is connected to other parts of India through National and State highways. The nearest cities to Indore by road are Dewas (around 35 km), Shajapur (100 km), Ujjain (around 57 km) and Bhopal (around 200 km).

The National Highways passing through the city are:

- National Highway 52 (NH 52) contains parts of the erstwhile NH3 (AB Rd stands for Agra Bombay Road) and it originates at Sangrur, Punjab and runs through Jaipur, Rajasthan, Indore, Dhule and terminates at Ankola in Karnataka.
- National Highway 47 starts from Bamanbore, Gujarat and reaches Indore via Ahmedabad and further connects Betul to terminate at Nagpur.

The highways which have ceased to exist because of renumbering are:

- National Highway 3 also known as the Agra-Bombay Road or AB Road, is an important highway connecting Agra to Mumbai via Indore, Dewas, Gwalior & Dhule.
- National Highway 59 & its branch NH 59A. NH 59 originated at Ahmedabad and passed through Godhra, Indore, Raipur, Brahmapur, Odisha and terminated at Gopalpur-on-Sea while NH 59A connected Indore & Betul.

The state highways passing through the city are:

- MP State Highway 27 runs from Jhalawar in Rajasthan, through Ujjain, Indore, Barwaha, Burhanpur in Madhya Pradesh and terminates at Malkapur, Buldhana in Maharashtra.
- MP State Highway 31 (Neemuch – Ratlam – Dhar)
- MP State Highway 18 connects Indore to Dewas, Bhopal, Ujjain and Ahmedabad.

=== Public transport ===
Indore's City Bus transport system runs through 277 km (172 mi) of road with a daily ridership of over 140,000. Atal Indore City Transport Services Ltd, a PPP scheme operates buses and radio taxis in the city. The buses designated as City Bus operate on 64 Routes with a fleet of 487 buses, with 421 bus stops. The buses are colour-coded into three colours: Blue, Magenta and Orange according to their route.

Indore BRTS (iBUS) is a bus rapid transit system with 53 air-conditioned buses equipped with services like GPS and IVR which are used to track the position of the bus with information displayed on LED displays installed at the bus stops.

Indore Auto Rickshaw is a service for small distance travel. Daily approx. 500,000 people travel within the city.

Indore Metro is a rapid transit system that has completed its successful first phase trail run.

Indore Cable Car was announced in January 2021 as another public transport for the city to decongest traffic. It will also be the first cable car in India to run on crowded streets.

Buses for other cities which are near Indore are operated by state transport and private transport operators. Cities like Ujjain, Dewas, Khandwa, Khargone are connected through daily road buses.

== Education ==
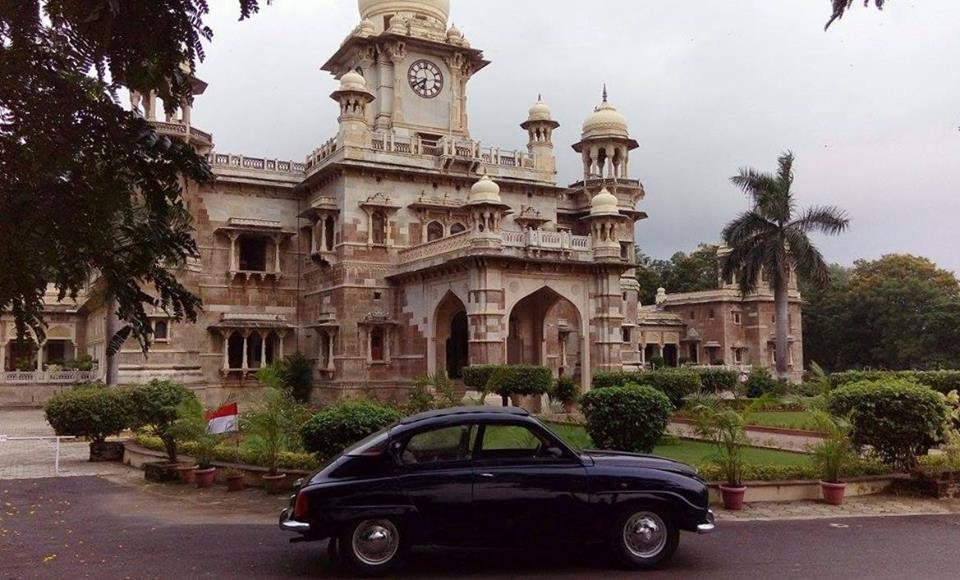
The Daly College (founded in 1870, one of the oldest boarding schools), in Indore, India

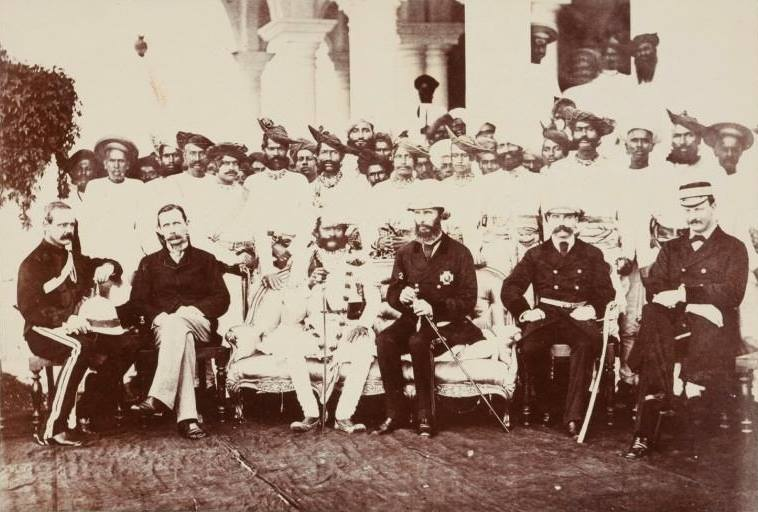
HH Maharaja Sir Jayaji Rao Scindia of Gwalior State, General Sir Henry Daly (founder of The Daly College), with British officers and Maratha nobility (Sardars, Jagirdars and Mankaris) in Indore, Holkar State, c. 1879

The Holkar Science College, established in 1891

The Daly College, founded in 1870 by General Henry Daly, is one of the oldest co-educational boarding school in the world, which was established to educate the rulers of the Central Indian princely states of the Marathas and Rajputs.

The Holkar Science College, officially known as Government Model Autonomous Holkar Science College was established in 1891.

Indore is the first city to have both IIT (Indian Institute of Technology Indore) and IIM (Indian Institute of Management Indore). Indore is home to a range of colleges and schools. Indore has a large student population and is a big educational centre in central India, it also is the education hub of central India. Most primary and secondary schools in Indore are affiliated with the Central Board of Secondary Education (CBSE); however, quite a few numbers of schools are affiliated with ICSE board, NIOS board, CBSE board, and the state level M.P. Board as well.

Indian Institute of Technology Indore is one of the most prestigious institutions in the country. Started in 2009, IIT Indore has its 500-acre campus in Simrol (28 km from Indore City). IIT Indore has several disciplines including Civil Engineering, Computer Science Engineering, Electrical Engineering, Mechanical Engineering, Metallurgy, and Material Science.

IIT Indore ranked 15 under the engineering category in the National Institute Ranking Framework. IIT Indore's central library emphasises the use of Online Information Resources. The library provides its users access to nearly 3800 electronic journals as well as access to databases such as ACM Digital Library, IEEE Xplore Digital Library, Science Direct, MathSciNet, JSTOR, SciFinder, Taylor and Francis, WILEY, and Springer. The library also provides air-conditioned and Wi-Fi enabled reading halls.

Raja Ramanna Centre for Advanced Technology is a unit of Department of Atomic Energy, Government of India, engaged in R&D in non-nuclear front-line research areas of lasers, particle accelerators and related technologies. The centre is situated at the south-western end of the Indore, Madhya Pradesh.The RRCAT campus is spread over 760 hectares on the outskirts of Indore city. The campus encompasses laboratories, staff housing colony and other basic amenities like school, sports facilities, shopping complex, gardens etc.

Devi Ahilya Vishwavidyalaya, also known as DAVV (formerly known as University of Indore or Indore Vishwavidyalaya), is a university in Indore with several colleges operating under its aegis. It has two campuses within the city, one at Takshila Parisar (near Bhavarkuan Square) and another at Rabindra Nath Tagore Road, Indore. The university runs several departments including Institute of Management Studies, School of Computer Science & Information Technology(SCSIT), (IMS), School of Law (SoL), Institute of Engineering and Technology, DAVV (IET), Educational Multimedia Research Centre (EMRC), International Institute of Professional Studies (IIPS), School of Pharmacy, School of Energy & Environmental Studies – one of the primer schools for MTech (Energy Management), School of Journalism and School of Futures Studies and Planning, which runs two MTech Courses with specialisations in Technology Management & Systems Science & Engineering, MBA (Business Forecasting), an MSc in Science & Technology Communication. The campus houses several other research and educational departments, hostels, playgrounds, and cafes.

The Indian Institute of Soybean Research (IISR) (ICAR, Government of India), Asia's largest soybean research centre, is headquartered in Indore. There are 16 laboratories in the facility for different disciplines, including genetic engineering, application of artificial intelligence in image analysis, big data analysis, food processing, agriculture machinery, nanotechnology, biotechnology, remote sensing, and application of IOT in agriculture.

Situated in the heart of Malwa, Indore enjoys the status of an "educational and industrial Capital of Madhya Pradesh". To initiate and strengthen agricultural research and development in Malwa and Nimar regions, the Institute of Plant Industry came into existence in 1924. In 1959, the Government College of Agriculture, Indore was established with the merger of the erstwhile Institute of Plant Industry (IPI). It was a prestigious campus of Jawaharlal Nehru Krishi Vishwa Vidyalaya, Jabalpur, since 1964. After the bifurcation of Jawaharlal Nehru Krishi Vishwavidyalaya, Jabalpur in 2008 and a separate second agricultural university was formed, that is, Rajmata Vijiyaraje Scindia Krishi Vishwavidyalaya, Gwalior, now College of Agriculture, Indore is coming under the juridicition of RVSKVV, Gwalior.

The Shri Govindram Seksaria Institute of Technology and Science (SGSITS), formerly Shri Govindram Seksaria Kala Bhavan, is a public engineering institution located in Indore. It was established in 1952 as a technical institute offering licentiate and diploma courses in engineering. New Delhi granted the status of an autonomous institution in 1989. In 2020, it became the first and only Madhya Pradesh government-funded engineering college in the state to have made its place among the top 250 in the National Institutional Ranking Framework (NIRF) ranking released by Ministry of Human Resource Development, Government of India.

The Mahatma Gandhi Memorial Medical College (MGMMC), established in 1878 as the King Edward Medical School, is one of the oldest and premiere government run medical colleges in India. It is attached to tertiary teaching hospitals named Maharaja Yeshwantrao group of Hospitals established in 1955. Indore also has two other Privately run medical colleges which act as teritary care hospitals, they are SAIMS and Index Medical College and Hospital.

The College of Veterinary Sciences and Animal Husbandry, Mhow is a constituent college of Nanaji Deshmukh Veterinary Science University, Jabalpur an autonomous Veterinary University in India, and is a pioneer college in the field of Veterinary Sciences in India. It is one of the oldest veterinary colleges in Madhya Pradesh and India was founded in 1955 the present building of the college was inaugurated by the first prime minister of India Pt.Jawahar Lal Nehru on 12 November 1959.

Sri Aurobindo Institute of Medical Sciences (SAIMS) is a group of colleges located in Indore. It features Mohak Hitech Speciality Hospital within the campus.

VIBGYOR Group of Schools have a branch in Vijay Nagar.

== Health and medicine ==
Indore is home to 51 public health institutions and has a number of private hospitals. The healthcare facilities of Indore include Government run tertiary teaching hospital Maharaja Yeshwantrao Hospital attached to Mahatma Gandhi Memorial Medical College, Indore. Private run hospitals include Bombay Hospital, SAIMS, Index Medical College & Hospital, Choithram Hospital, Shalby Hospital, CHL Hospital, Medanta, Apollo, Vasan, Centre for Sight and Navchetna Rehabilitation and Deaddiction Centre.

The National Family Health Survey of 2018 found Indore to be India's most vegetarian city, with 49% of residents eschewing meat products.

== Media ==
=== Print media ===
There are about 20 Hindi dailies, 7 English dailies, 26 weeklies and monthlies, four quarterlies, two bi-monthly magazines, one annual paper, and one monthly Hindi language educational tabloid named Campus Diary published from the city. India's only magazine on the pump industry, Pumps India, and valve magazine Valves India are published from here.

=== Electronic media ===
The radio industry has expanded with a number of private and government-owned FM channels being introduced.

Indore switched to complete digitalisation of cable TV in 2013 under the second phase of digitalisation by Ministry of Information and Broadcasting. Indore is covered by a network of optical fibre cables. Doordarshan Kendra Indore with studio and transmission started from July 2000.

=== Wi-Fi ===
There are various companies providing paid and free Wi-Fi services across the city. Reliance's Jionet became operational in November 2013. It covers the whole city and is a 4.5 GHz high-speed Wi-Fi service which was initially free but become chargeable in 2016. Indore is the second city in India to provide free Wi-Fi across the city. AICSTL provides a high-speed free Wi-Fi service named 'Free As Air' across the Indore BRTS corridor. BSNL has also started free Wi-Fi services in prominent locations.

== Sports ==
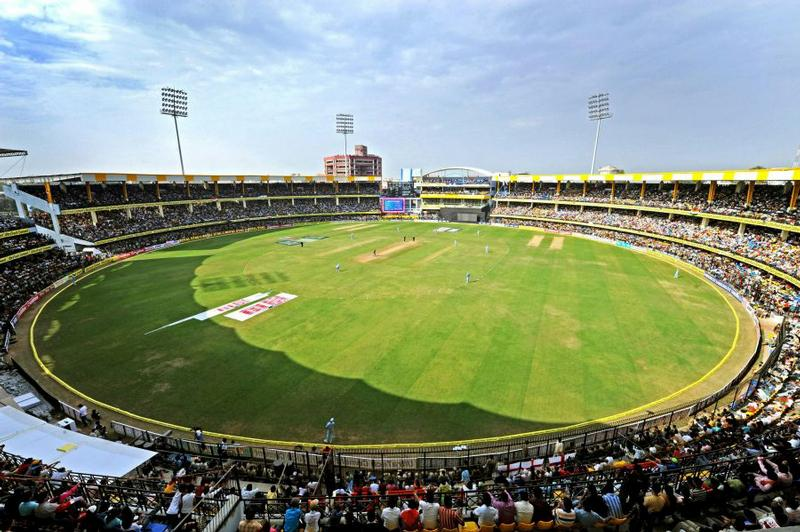
Holkar Cricket Stadium, Indore

Cricket is one of the most popular sports in the city. Indore is also home to the Madhya Pradesh Cricket Association (MPCA), Madhya Pradesh Table Tennis Association (MPTTA), and the city has one international cricket ground, the Holkar Cricket Stadium. The first ODI cricket match in the state was played in Indore at Nehru Stadium in 1983.

Besides cricket, Indore is also a centre for many national and international championships. The city hosted the South Asian Billiard Championship and is a host to the three-day-long National Triathlon Championship, in which nearly 450 players and 250 sports officials belonging to 23 states take part in the action.

Indore was included in holding two Guinness World Records for holding the largest tea party in the world and for making the largest burger in the world.

== Cityscape ==
=== Rajwada Palace ===
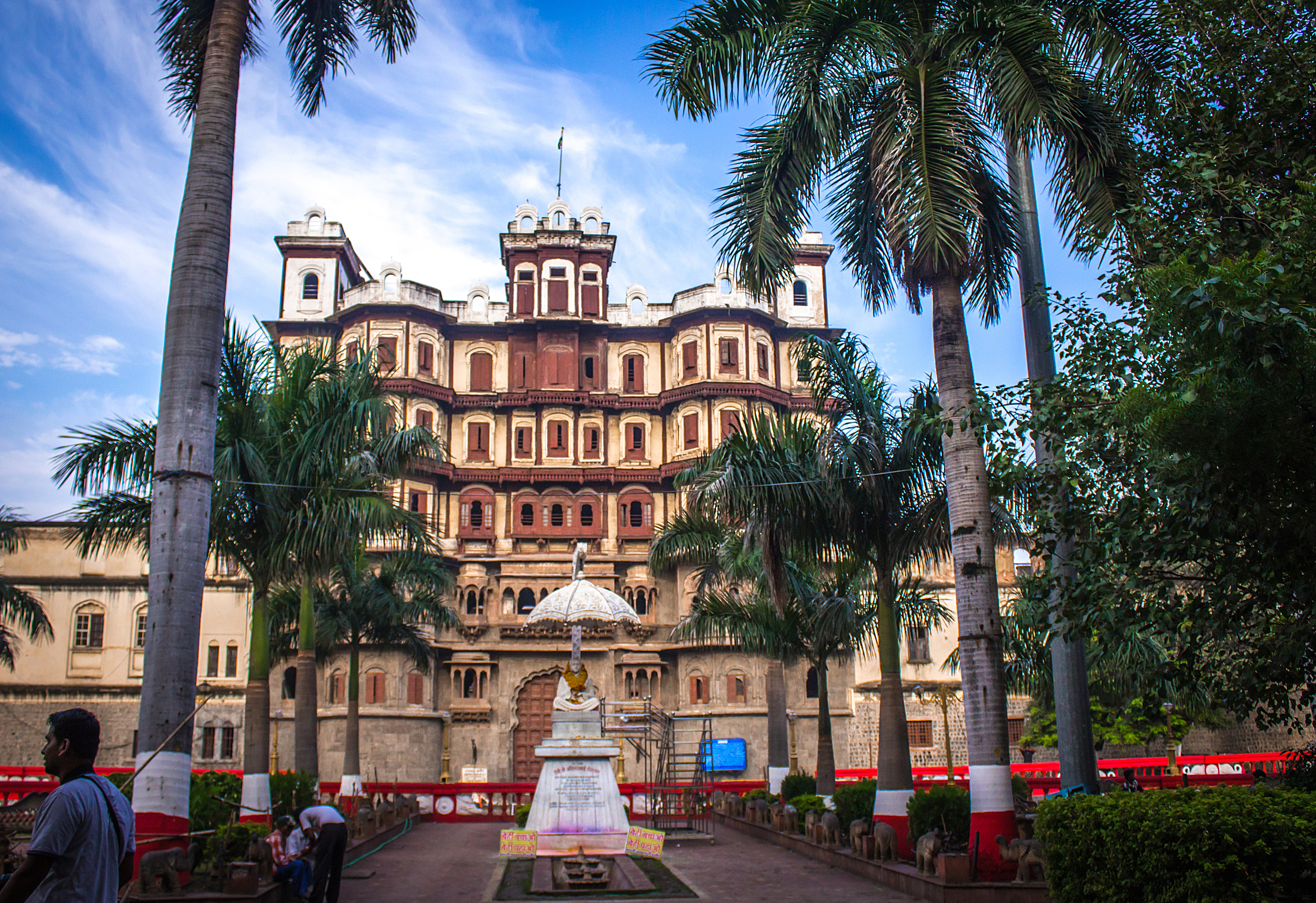
Rajwada palace

Rajwada Palace is a historical palace in Indore city. It was built by the Holkars of the Maratha Empire about two centuries ago. This seven-storied structure is located near the Chhatris.

=== Shiv Vilas Palace ===
Shiv Vilas Palace is a royal palace built during the reign of the Holkar dynasty. Also called the 'new palace', it was built after the Rajwada palace was damaged in an attack. It is on the right side of the Rajwada palace.

=== Gomatgiri ===
Gomatgiri is a revered Jain pilgrimage site situated on a hill near Indore, Madhya Pradesh, India. Spread over an expanse of lush greenery, this serene location is home to a majestic 21-foot statue of Gomateshwar, also known as Bahubali, which mirrors the famous statue located in Shravanabelagola, Karnataka. Established in 1981, Gomatgiri offers a tranquil retreat for spiritual seekers and visitors alike, with its picturesque views and spiritually uplifting atmosphere. The complex houses 24 marble temples, each dedicated to one of the 24 Tirthankaras of Jainism, symbolising the religion's rich heritage and teachings. This place is not only a spiritual centre but also a popular tourist attraction, drawing visitors from all corners for its architectural beauty and the peace it offers away from the bustle of city life.

=== Kanch Mandir ===
Kanch Mandir, literally 'temple of glass', is a famous Jain temple in Indore, built by Sir Seth Hukumchand Jain. Its construction began sometime around 1903.

=== Khajrana Ganesh Mandir ===
Khajrana Ganesh Mandir is a pilgrimage centre in Indore, dedicated to Lord Ganapati. The current temple was built during the reign of Holkar Dynasty. The main Idol of the temple was placed in a well to save it from the mughal ruler Aurangzeb. It was recovered by the Holkar ruler Maharani Ahilya Bai Holkar. It is situated in the Khajrana area, a little distance away from Kalka Mata Temple.

=== Lalbagh Palace ===
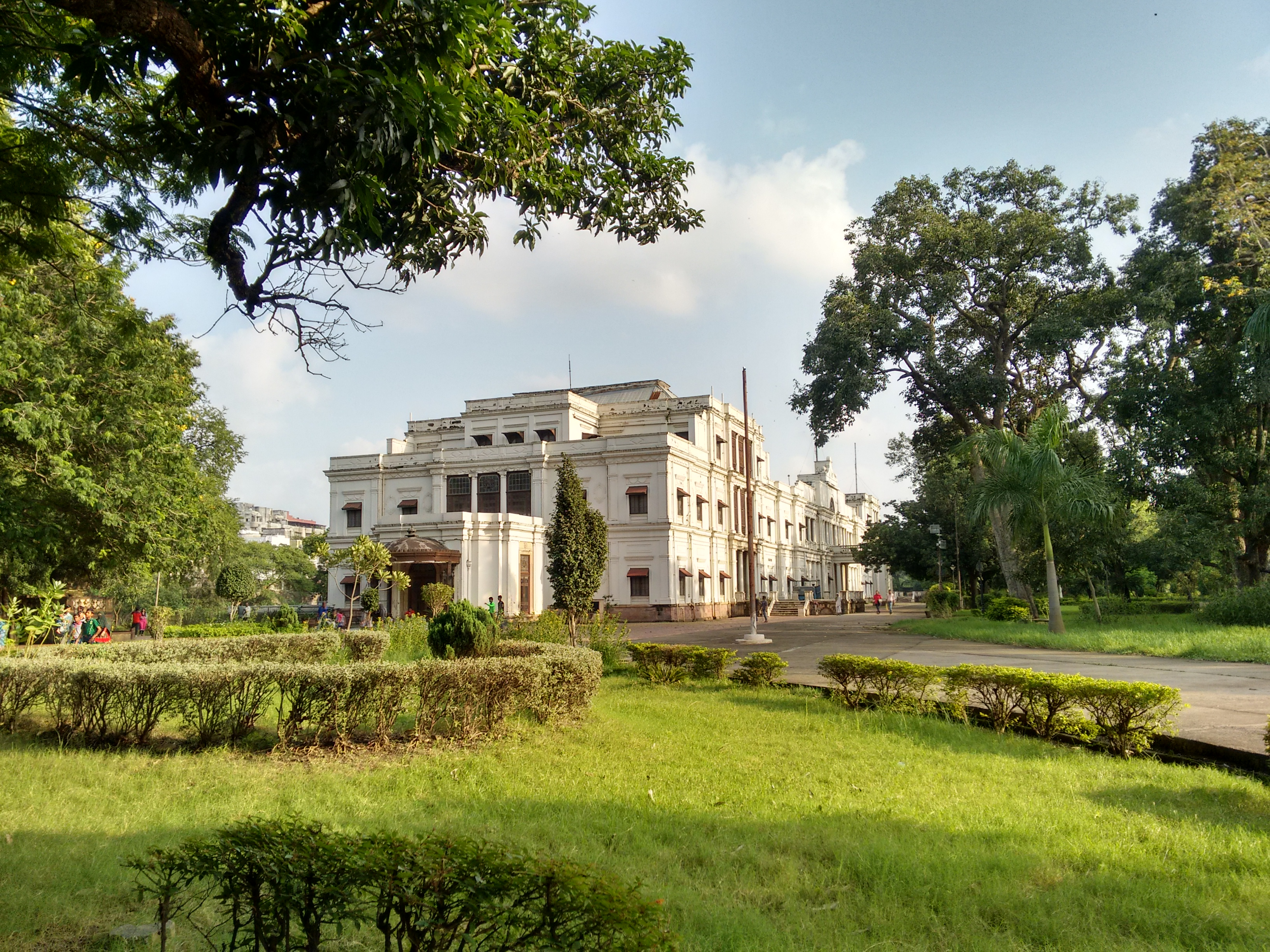
Lalbagh Palace

Lalbagh Palace was built by the Holkar Dynasty between 1886 and 1921. The interior is beautified with striated Italian marble pillars, many chandeliers and classical columns, murals of Greek deities, a baroque-cum-rococo dining room, an English-library-style office with leather armchairs, a Renaissance sitting room, and a Palladian queen's bedroom which was the fashion among many of the late Raj-era Indian nobility, accompanied by a billiards room. There is imitation of the Buckingham Palace gates creak at the entrance along with 28-hectare ground, where, near to the palace, stands the statue of Queen Victoria.

=== Manik Bagh ===
Manik Bagh palace was built in 1930 when Maharajah Yashwant Rao Holkar II commissioned the construction of the Manik Bagh ("Jewel Garden") palace. The architect was Eckart Muthesius (1904–1989) from Germany. The maharaja was at a young age at that time, as was Muthesius who was just a couple of years older. The work outside and inside was done in a late art deco and the international style of modern architecture.

=== Yeshwant Club ===
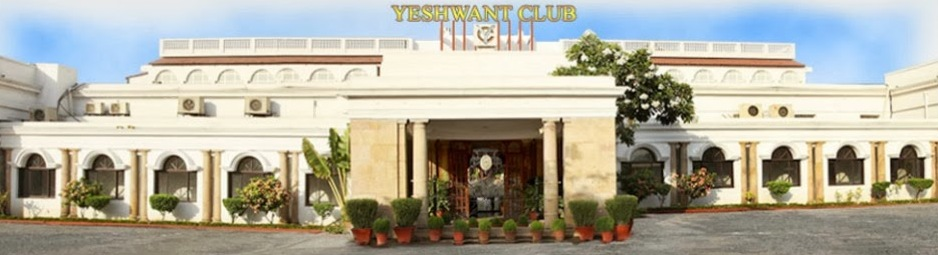
The Yeshwant Club, established in 1934

The Yeshwant Club came into existence in 1934 at the behest of late the Maharaja Tukoji Rao III Holkar of Indore. The club was established for their son, Yuvraj Yeshwant Rao Holkar. Spread over 14 acres, it is a Maratha Empire legacy of the Holkar rulers of Indore State. Initially, the club was opened for Maratha royalty, nobility, aristocracy, and the officers (Natives and British) of the Holkar State. Later its doors were opened for the business elites. Post-Indian Independence, the admission criteria were revised according to the changing times. Maharani Usha Devi, the daughter of late Maharaja Yeshwant Rao II Holkar of Indore is the chief patron of the club, the Honorary Chief Minister of Madhya Pradesh being the president of the club.

=== Sirpur Lake ===
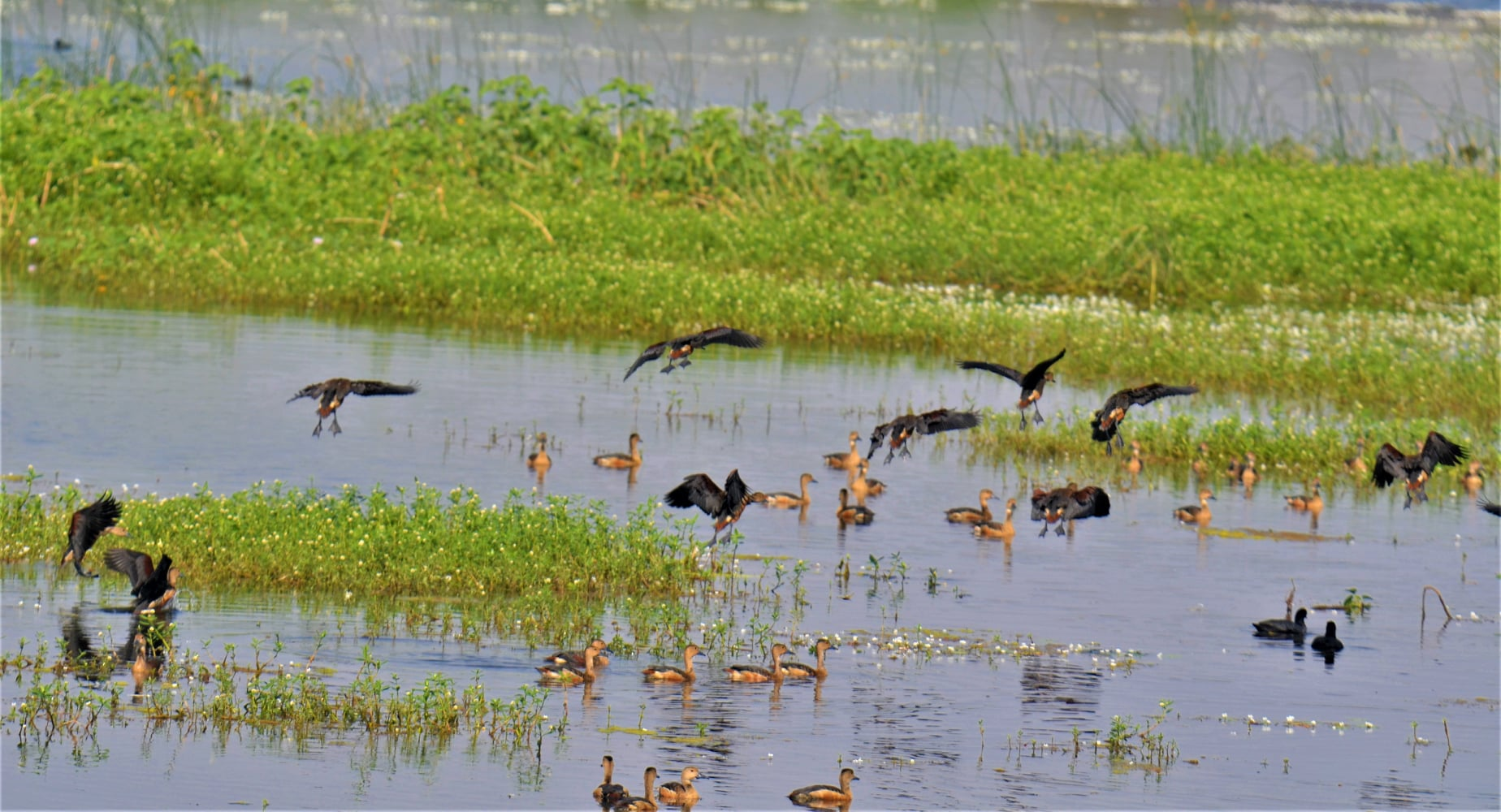
Birds at Sirpur wetland

The Sirpur Lake is the most important bird-watching site in Malwa. It is a Ramsar site located on Dhar Road in Indore. It is known for more than 180 species of resident and migratory birds. It was restored to a viable bird habitat from a heavily encroached pool over four decades since 1980 by Padmashri Bhalu Mondhe and his NGO The Nature Volunteers, and was declared an Important Bird and Biodiversity Area in 2015–16.

Indore received accreditation under the Ramsar Convention's Wetland City Accreditation Scheme alongside Udaipur, making it one of India's first two Ramsar Wetland Cities.

The city's ecological planning heritage dates to 1912, when British planner Patrick Geddes incorporated environmental considerations into his layout design. A key wetland associated with Indore's accreditation is Sirpur Lake. Under the Ramsar framework, accredited cities must provide progress updates every three years and demonstrate cross-sectoral accountability in wetland management. The accreditation of Indore was facilitated by Wetlands International South Asia (WISA) as a knowledge partner. Dr. Ritesh Kumar of WISA noted that Colombo's experience, where flooding of the national parliament building, constructed in a wetland, forced a complete rethinking of city planning, illustrates the global lesson that integrating ecological resilience into urban development is not optional but a practical necessity.

It is one of the most important bird habitats in Malwa region. Another Ramsar site near Indore is Yashwant Sagar.

=== Pitra Parvat ===
Pitra Parvat is known for the statue of Lord Hanuman situated there. The sculpture is made with 8 elements in golden colour. It took 125 workers and seven years to complete the statue of the deity Lord Hanuman. Also present there, is a temple that has the small statue of Lord Hanuman for the devotees to worship. Lord Hanuman is seen sitting in the lap of Mother Anjani in this temple.

Pitreshwar Hanuman Temple, located at Pitru Parvat on Bijasan Road in Indore, is known for its 72-foot tall Ashtadhatu statue of Lord Hanuman. Unlike typical depictions, this statue presents Hanuman in a meditative posture, making it a unique spiritual and cultural landmark. The site has become a popular tourist destination, combining religious significance with natural beauty and environmental awareness.

=== Annapurna Temple ===
Annapurna Temple, located in Indore, Madhya Pradesh, is a prominent Hindu temple dedicated to Goddess Annapurna, the deity of nourishment. Inspired by the architecture of South Indian temples, the temple features a towering gopuram, intricate carvings, and vibrant sculptures. It is not only a place of worship but also a cultural and architectural attraction in the city. The temple complex also houses shrines dedicated to Lord Shiva, Lord Hanuman, and Kal Bhairav. It is a popular destination for devotees and tourists alike.

== Place to visit near Indore ==
- Patalpani waterfall
- Mandu
- Mahakal Temple
- Omkareshwar

== See also ==
- Mhow
- Ujjain
- Dewas
- List of people from Indore
- Indore City Bus
- Indore BRTS
- Indore Fashion Week
- Indore Metro
- List of cities in India by population
- Largest Indian Cities by GDP
- 2025 Indore drinking water contamination
