= Indian Institute of Soybean Research =

Indian research institute

- Other name: ICAR-IISR
- Type: Constituent establishment under the ICAR/DARE
- Established: 1987; 39 years ago
- Affiliations: Indian Council of Agricultural Research
- Academic affiliations: Department of Agricultural Research and Education
- Location: Indore, Madhya Pradesh, India; 22.6808°N 75.8742°E
- Website: iisrindore.icar.gov.in

The Indian Institute of Soybean Research, Indore (ICAR-IISR) is an agricultural research institution located in Indore (Madhya Pradesh, India) that focuses on basic and strategic research on soybeans.

IISR was established under the aegis of the Indian Council of Agricultural Research (ICAR), a government agency. It conducts agricultural research on soybean breeding, improvement, pathology, and value additions using soybean. The IISR coordinates and facilitates the conduct of soybean research at the national level through the All India Coordinated Research Projects on soybean (AICRP on Soybean) as well as providing links between various national and international agencies.

== History ==
The National Research Centre for Soybean was established in 1987 to conduct basic and strategic research on soybeans. The center has since been upgraded into a Directorate. The ICAR-Indian Institute of Soybean Research (IISR) is one of the leading research and development institutions in the field of soybeans. As a centralised research support organization, it provides basic technologies as well as breeding material for production system research. Through the All India Coordinated Research Project on Soybean (AICRPS), it is also responsible for inter-disciplinary and multi-location research.

== Mandate ==
The dissemination of soybean crop technology and capacity building, as well as trainings at the national and international level. Improve soybean production and quality by conducting research and providing access to information, knowledge (including the preservation of soybeans against pests and insects) and genetic material. Research and development programs at the Indian Institute of Soybean Research, Indore, have continuously developed new soybean varieties over the past decades. National and International collaboration on soybean crop.
