= Krishnapura Chhatri =

Memorial in Indore, India

Krishnapura Chhatris
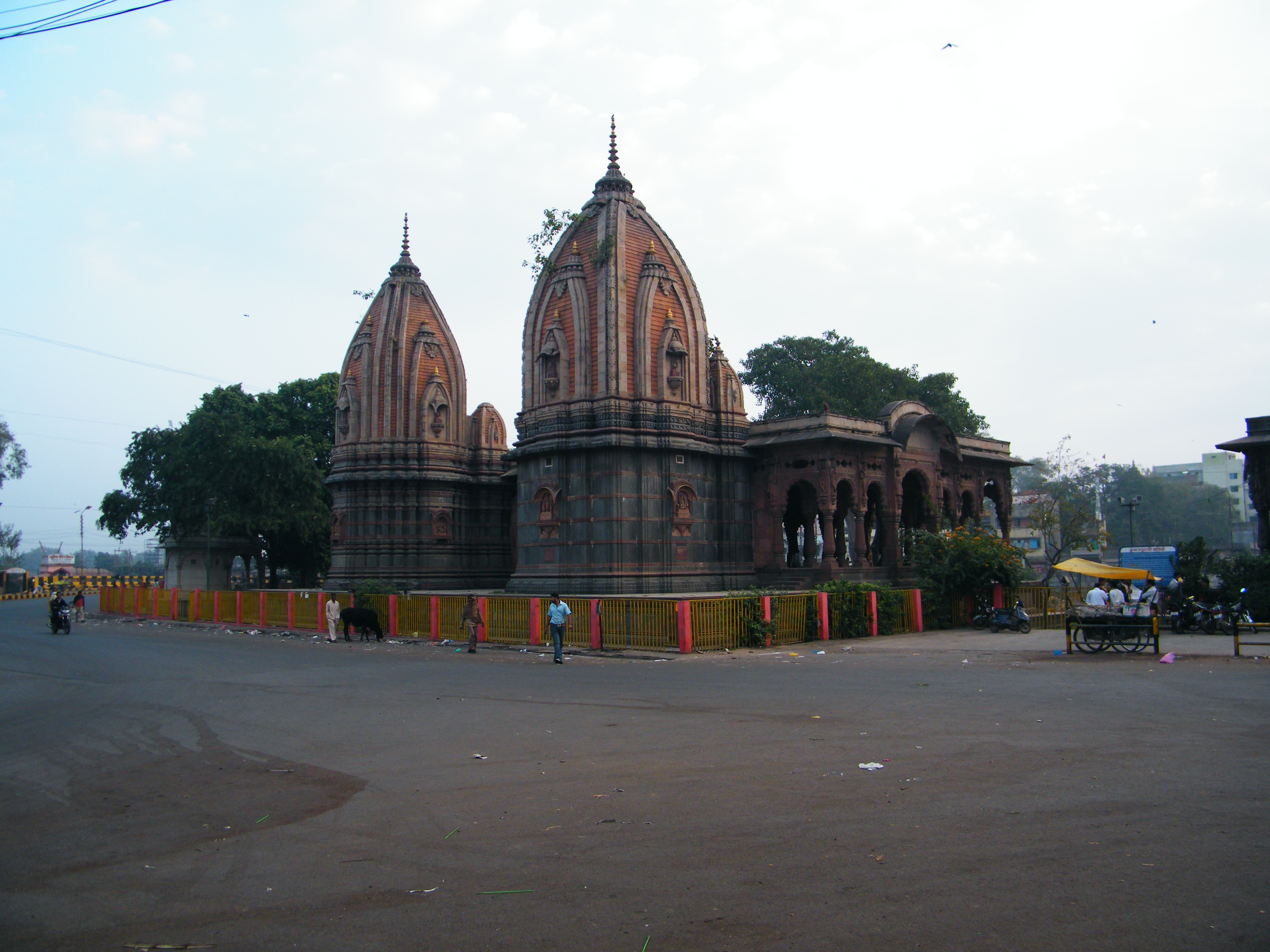
- Interactive map of Krishnapura Chhatris
- Location: Indore, Madhya Pradesh
- Type: Chhatri
- Material: Stone
- Completion date: c. 1849
- Dedicated to: Holkar Dynasty

The Krishnapura Chhatris, also known as the Krishna Pura Chhatris are three chhatris located in Indore, Madhya Pradesh, India. The structures were built by the Holkars as cenotaphs over the spots where people of importance were cremated, leading to them also being known as the Holkar Chhatris. All three of the Chhatris are located half a kilometer from the city palace, Rajwada, which was also built by the Holkar dynasty.

== Description ==
=== History ===
The powerful family that built the chhatris, the Holkars, were originally a minor clan within the Maratha empire. They belonged to the Dhangar caste, which originated in Maharashtra. While part of the Maratha empire, the Holkars fought against the Mughals and the British East India Company. However, following the Third Anglo-Maratha War and the subsequent collapse of the Maratha empire in 1818, the Holkars agreed to establish a protectorate on behalf of the East India Company in Indore. This diplomatic move established the Holkar dynasty, which ruled the Indore state until Indian Independence in 1948.

The Krishnapura Chhatri themselves were built in the mid 19th century to honor the deceased members of the Holkar dynasty. They are named for Krishna Bai Holkar, the wife of famed military leader Yashwantrao Holkar and the mother of Malhar Rao Holkar II. The structures are built over the spots where the rulers of the Indore state were cremated.

=== Complex ===
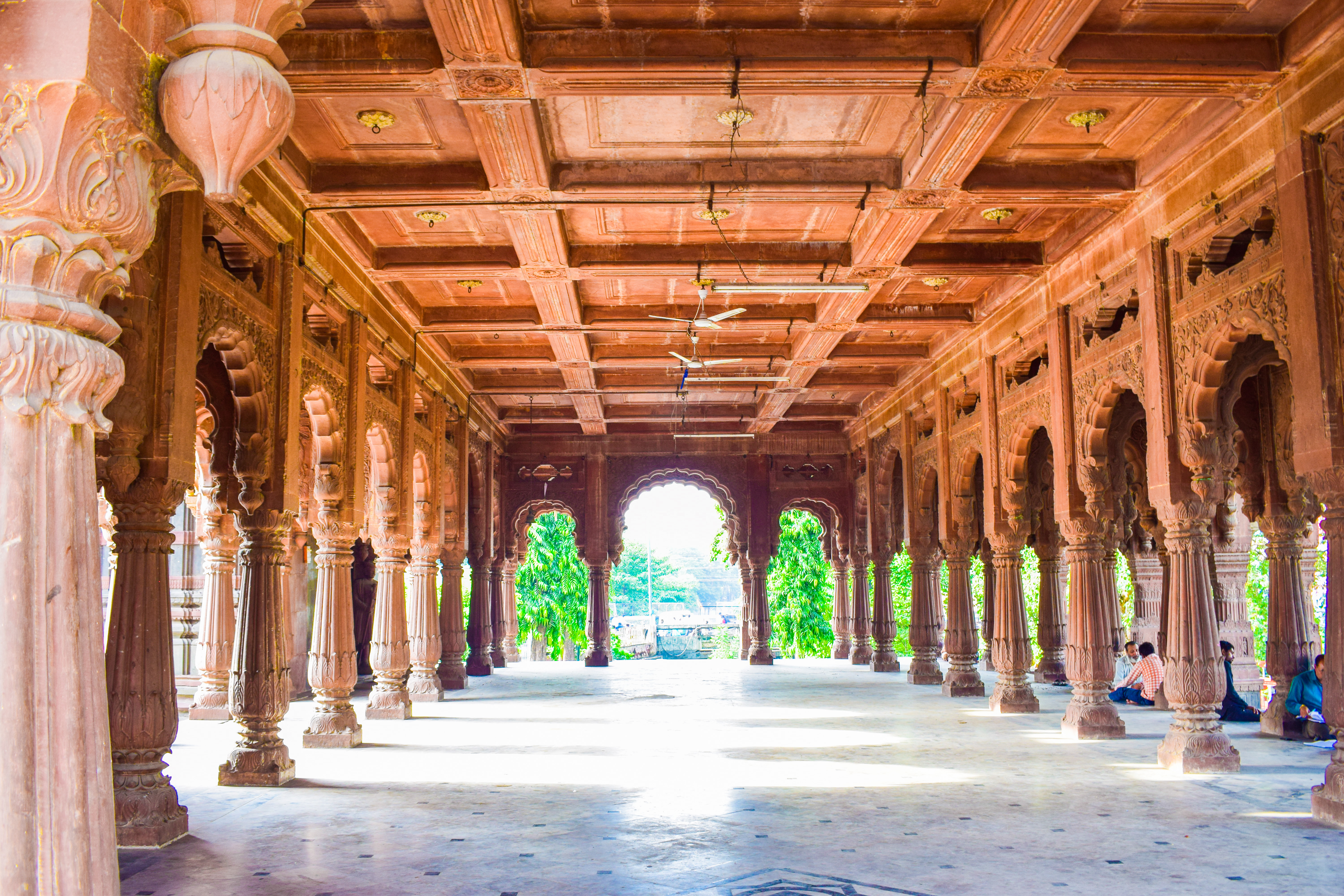
Interior of the chhatri complex

The complex contains three chhatris and five cenotaphs. Steps from the back of the site lead to the bank of the nearby Kahn river. The chhatris are made of several different types of stone, and feature elaborately carved exteriors and columns. The site around half a kilometer from Rajwada Palace.

Due to the site's location within the city of Indore, parts of the complex have previously fallen into disrepair. As of 2018 efforts were being conducted to clean up the area. In 2018 the Madhya Pradesh Tourism Board announced that it would include the chhatris on a walking tour of the historic sites of Indore.
