= Indore Lok Sabha constituency =

Lok Sabha Constituency in Madhya Pradesh, India

Coordinates: 22.75°N 75.83°E

Indore
- Lok Sabha constituency
- Interactive Map Outlining Indore Lok Sabha constituency

Constituency details
- Country: India
- Region: Central India
- State: Madhya Pradesh
- Assembly constituencies: Depalpur; Indore-1; Indore-2; Indore-3; Indore-4; Indore-5; Rau; Sanwer
- Established: 1952
- Reservation: None

Member of Parliament
- 18th Lok Sabha
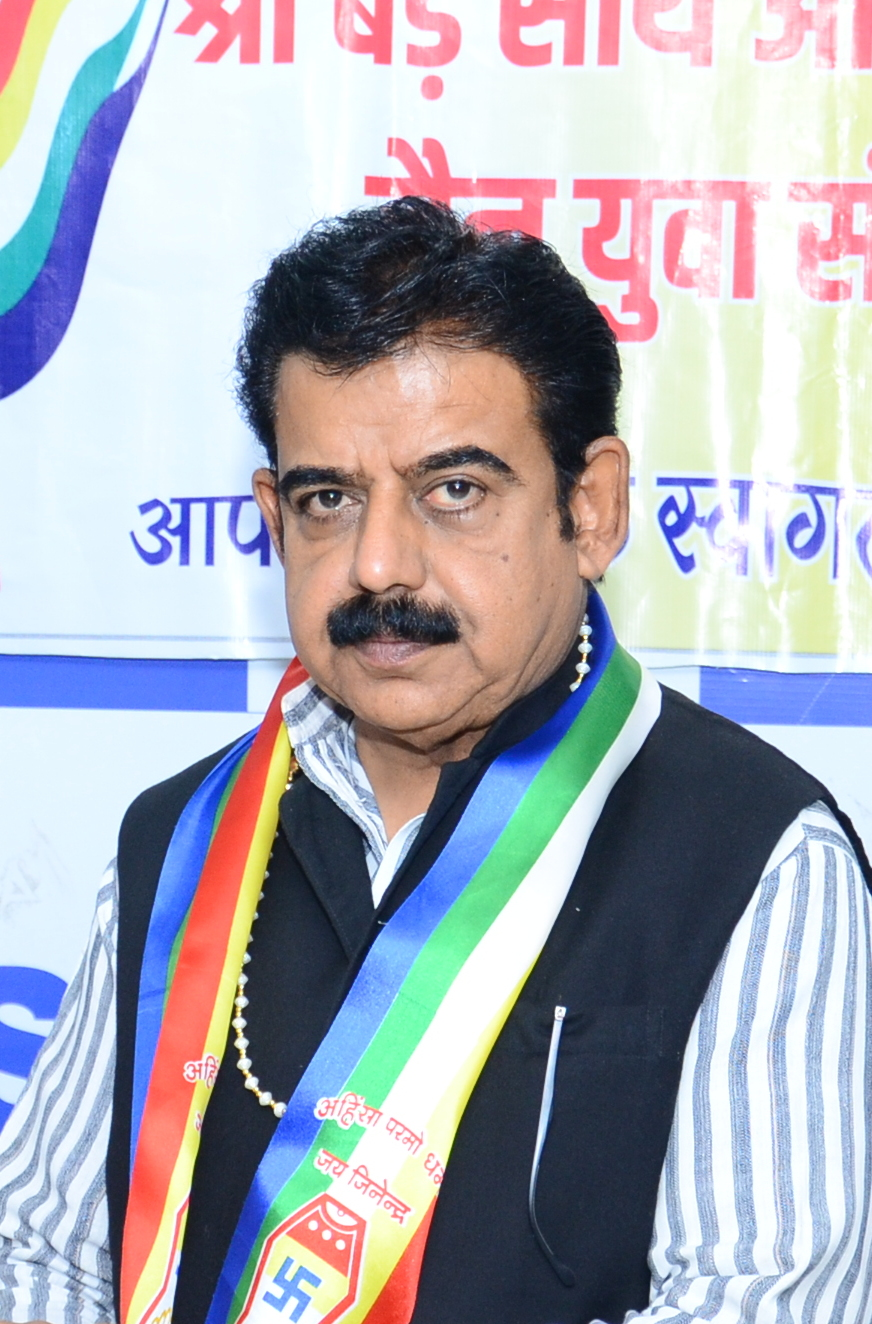
- Incumbent Shankar Lalwani
- Party: Bharatiya Janata Party
- Elected year: 2024

Indore Lok Sabha constituency is one of the 29 Lok Sabha constituencies in Madhya Pradesh state in central India. This constituency covers most of the Indore district.

The Member of Parliament from Indore Lok Sabha constituency is Shankar Lalwani. Since 1989, the seat is held by the BJP. Before Lalwani, the seat was held for record 8 consecutive terms by BJP's Sumitra Mahajan since 1989, who was also the Speaker of the Lok Sabha between 2014 and 2019.

== Vidhan Sabha segments ==
Presently, Indore Lok Sabha constituency comprises the following eight Vidhan Sabha segments:

#	Name	District	Member	Party	2024 Lead
203	Depalpur	Indore	Manoj Patel	BJP	BJP
204	Indore-1	Indore	Kailash Vijayvargiya	BJP	BJP
205	Indore-2	Indore	Ramesh Mendola	BJP	BJP
206	Indore-3	Indore	Golu Shukla	BJP	BJP
207	Indore-4	Indore	Malini Gaur	BJP	BJP
208	Indore-5	Indore	Mahendra Hardia	BJP	BJP
210	Rau	Indore	Madhu Verma	BJP	BJP
211	Sanwer (SC)	Indore	Tulsiram Silawat	BJP	BJP

== Members of Parliament ==
Year	Winner	Party
1952	Nandlal Joshi	Indian National Congress
1957	Kanhaiyalal Khadiwala	Indian National Congress
1962	Homi F. Daji	Independent
1967	Prakash Chandra Sethi	Indian National Congress
1971	Prakash Chandra Sethi	Indian National Congress
1972^	Ram Singh Bhai	Indian National Congress
1977	Kalyan Jain	Janata Party
1980	Prakash Chandra Sethi	Indian National Congress (I)
1984	Prakash Chandra Sethi	Indian National Congress
1989	Sumitra Mahajan	Bharatiya Janata Party
1991	Sumitra Mahajan	Bharatiya Janata Party
1996	Sumitra Mahajan	Bharatiya Janata Party
1998	Sumitra Mahajan	Bharatiya Janata Party
1999	Sumitra Mahajan	Bharatiya Janata Party
2004	Sumitra Mahajan	Bharatiya Janata Party
2009	Sumitra Mahajan	Bharatiya Janata Party
2014	Sumitra Mahajan	Bharatiya Janata Party
2019	Shankar Lalwani	Bharatiya Janata Party
2024	Shankar Lalwani	Bharatiya Janata Party

== Election results ==
Vote share of winning candidates
2024	88.85%
2019	65.59%
2014	64.93%
2009	48.77%
2004	59.46%
1999	57.42%
1998	52.00%
1996	50.94%
1991	54.88%
1989	50.00%
1984	56.83%

=== 2024 election ===
2024 Indian general election: Indore
Party	Candidate	Votes	%	±%
BJP	Shankar Lalwani	1,226,751	78.54	▲12.95
NOTA	None of the Above	218,674	14.00	▲13.69
BSP	Sanjay Lakshman Solanki	51,659	3.31	▲2.78
Majority		11,75,095	75.23	▲41.61
Turnout		15,61,968	61.67	▼7.66
BJP hold		Swing		

=== 2019 election ===
2019 Indian general elections: Indore
Party	Candidate	Votes	%	±%
BJP	Shankar Lalwani	1,068,569	65.59	+0.66
INC	Pankaj Sanghvi	5,20,815	31.97	+2.50
BSP	Deepchand Ahirwal	8,666	0.53	−0.03
NOTA	None of the Above	5,045	0.31	−0.14
Majority		5,47,754	33.62	−1.84
Turnout		16,29,595	69.33	+7.08
BJP hold		Swing	+0.66	

=== 2014 election ===
2014 Indian general election: Indore
Party	Candidate	Votes	%	±%
BJP	Sumitra Mahajan	854,972	64.93	+16.16
INC	Satyanarayan Patel	3,88,071	29.47	−17.86
AAP	Anil Trivedi	35,169	2.67	+2.67
BSP	Dharamdas Ahirwar	7,422	0.56	−0.35
IND.	Mohammad Imitiyaz Khan	3,862	0.29	+0.29
NOTA	None of the Above	5,944	0.45	+0.45
Majority		4,66,901	35.46	+34.02
Turnout		13,16,817	62.25	+11.49
BJP hold		Swing	+16.16	

=== 2009 election ===
2009 Indian general election: Indore
Party	Candidate	Votes	%	±%
BJP	Sumitra Mahajan	388,662	48.77	−10.69
INC	Satyanarayan Patel	3,77,182	47.33	+10.56
BSP	Rahim Khan	7,226	0.91	–0.30
SP	Dr. Anita Yadav	3,381	0.42	–0.06
IND.	S. R. Mandloi	3,360	0.42	+0.42
RJD	Sanjay Singh Bhadoriya	2,472	0.31	+0.31
Majority		11,480	1.44	−21.25
Turnout		7,96,910	50.76	−7.70
BJP hold		Swing	-10.69	

=== 2004 election ===
2004 Indian general election: Indore
Party	Candidate	Votes	%	±%
BJP	Sumitra Mahajan	508,107	59.46	+2.04
INC	Rameshwar Patel	3,14,171	36.77	–4.75
BSP	Kailashchander Kanwarlal Sahu	10,331	1.21	+0.81
Independent	Raju Soni	5,635	0.66	+0.66
Independent	Ajit Kumar Jain Patwa	4,453	0.52	+0.52
SP	Rajendra Yadav	4,142	0.48	+0.48
Independent	Parmanand Tolani	2,211	0.26	+0.26
Independent	Nandkishor Agrawal	2,075	0.24	+0.24
Independent	Moolchand Rathore	1,933	0.23	+0.23
Independent	Nandkishor Agrawal	1,445	0.17	+0.17
Majority		1,93,936	22.69	+6.79
Turnout		8,54,503	58.46	+2.00
BJP hold		Swing		

=== 20th century ===
==== 1999 election ====
1999 Indian general election: Indore
Party	Candidate	Votes	%	±%
BJP	Sumitra Mahajan	474,167	57.42	
INC	Mahesh Joshi	342,852	41.52	
BSP	Suresh Yadav	3,262	0.40	
RJD	Shaikh Masaruddin	984	0.12	
Majority		1,31,315	15.90	
Turnout		8,25,794	56.46	
BJP hold		Swing		

==== 1998 election ====
1998 Indian general election: Indore
Party	Candidate	Votes	%	±%
BJP	Sumitra Mahajan	440,047	52.00	
INC	Pankaj Sanghvi	3,90,195	46.11	
SP	Kalyan Jain	4,536	0.54	
BSP	Akhtar Baig Karamat Baig	984	0.42	
Majority		49,852	5.89	
Turnout		8,46,291	59.45	
BJP hold		Swing		

==== 1996 election ====
1996 Indian general election: Indore
Party	Candidate	Votes	%	±%
BJP	Sumitra Mahajan	338,327	50.94	
INC	Madhukar Verma	2,33,894	35.22	
AIIC(T)	Anil Lal Bahadur	54,460	8.20	
Independent	Rana Ram Prasad Yadav	3,081	0.46	
Majority		1,04,433	15.72	
Turnout		6,64,159	53.58	
BJP hold		Swing		

==== 1991 election ====
1991 Indian general election: Indore
Party	Candidate	Votes	%	±%
BJP	Sumitra Mahajan	303,269	54.88	
INC	Lalit Jain	2,22,675	40.30	
Majority		80,594	14.58	
Turnout		5,52,568	48.03	
BJP hold		Swing		

==== 1989 election ====
1989 Indian general election: Indore
Party	Candidate	Votes	%	±%
BJP	Sumitra Mahajan	319,123	50.00	
INC	Prakash Chandra Sethi	2,07,509	32.51	
Majority		1,11,614	17.49	
Turnout		6,38,218	58.90	
BJP gain from INC		Swing		

==== 1984 election ====
1984 Indian general election: Indore
Party	Candidate	Votes	%	±%
INC	Prakash Chandra Sethi	272,122	56.83	
BJP	Rajendra Nilkanth Dharkar	1,81,296	37.86	
Majority		90,826	18.97	
Turnout		4,78,826	60.58	
INC hold		Swing		

== See also ==
- Indore district
- List of constituencies of the Lok Sabha
