= Ramsingh Bhai Verma =

Indian trade unionist and politician (born 1912)

Ramsingh Bhai Verma or Ramsingh Bhai Karansingh (born 1912) was an Indian trade unionist and politician. He emerged as a prominent leader of Indore textile workers in the 1940s and 1950s, but was eventually ousted from his leadership role in an internal dispute in 1963/1964. He was a member of the Lok Sabha (lower house of the Parliament of India) from 1957 to 1962 and 1972 to 1977.

== Youth ==
He was born in Kota, a Rajputana princely state on October 31, 1912. He was the son of Karansingh Verma, a shikari (hunter's guide) and Jadon Rajput. As a young boy, per his own account, he was enrolled in a Rajput state school (military training facility). During his youth years Ramsingh Verma was attracted to nationalist politics and became active in the social reform movement against feudalism in the Rajput community. He was taken prisoner, but escaped. He boarded the Frontier Mail train without a ticket, and ended up in Ahmedabad. He stayed at the Sabarmati Ashram for two years. Verma took part in the 1930 Salt March. In 1932 he became a trade union organizer. He worked under the supervision of Gulzarilal Nanda and Kandubhai Desai in the Ahmedabad Textile Labour Association, and obtained prominence as a capable organizer. The Gujaratis affectively called him 'Ramsinghbhai' ('bhai' meaning 'brother'). He joined the Indian National Congress in 1934. Verma married Shanti Devi in 1934, the couple would go on to have one son and one daughter.

== Indore labour leader ==
In the period leading up to World War II the textile workers union movement in Indore had come under communist control. Maharaja Yashwant Rao Holkar II requested support from pro-Congress trade unions. In response Gulzarilal Nanda sent Dravid and Ramsingh Verma to Indore to build a pro-Congress textile workers trade union to compete with the communists. They founded the Indore Mill Mazdoor Sangh in December 1941. Verma was the general secretary of the union. Dravid and Verma emerged as popular leaders and came to constitute a faction in the Indian National Congress in Indore. Dravid and Verma were arrested during the 1942 Quit India movement, and spent nearly a year and a half in detention. In jail they befriended Gangaram Tiwari, whom they recruited to IMMS. They were released in late 1943, after which the IMMS was reactivated. By 1943 IMMS had some 1,760 members. By 1945 the IMMS membership had grown to around 5,000.

Verma became the IMMS president in 1947. He took part in the 1947 movement for democratic government in Indore State, and became a Constituent Assembly member of the state. In 1949 he became a member of the Madhya Bharat Legislative Assembly. He became the president of the Madhya Bharat unit of the Indian National Trade Union Congress in 1947. After the merger of Madhya Bharat into Madhya Pradesh, he became the Madhya Pradesh INTUC president. In 1949 he became the secretary of the National Textile Federation. In 1953 he became one of the vice presidents of INTUC nation-wide.

== Union boss ==
As of the 1952 elections there were three main factions in the Congress Party in Indore, the Nai Duniya faction (representing the former Praja Mandal movement), the Khadiwala faction (Hindi-speaking Brahmans) and the labour faction of Verma and Dravid. The labour faction and Nai Duniya faction got two seats each to contest in the 1952 Madhya Bharat Legislative Assembly election whilst the Khadiwala faction got the Indore Lok Sabha seat. The labour faction candidates were Verma and Dravid. Verma contested the constituency were most of the labourers lived, Indore City A. Verma won the Indore City A seat, obtaining 10,276 votes (49.05%, which at the time was considered a relatively poor result for a Congress candidate).

Apart from regular trade union activities, IMMS also engaged in social welfare activities and setting up workers housing colonies. Ahead of the 1957 elections, Verma wanted to contest the Indore Lok Sabha seat. This was a set to far for the old elites of Indore, who did not consent to the labour faction having both two out of 4 Indore legislative seats as well as the national parliamentary seat of the city. Kanhaiyalal Khadiwala also wanted to contest the seat. The Congress Party leadership mediated between the Indore labour faction and the old city elites, and in the end Verma was offered to runs as the Congress Party candidate in the Nimar (Khargone) Lok Sabha seat. Verma won the seat, in a relatively close contest against Jan Sangh candidate Ramchandra Bade. Verma won the seat, obtaining 73,180 votes (47.45%).

== 1962 election ==
In the 1962 Indian general election Verma got the chance to contest the Indore Lok Sabha seat. During the campaign Verma quoted Prime Minister Jawaharlal Nehru statement that "[t]here are two Congress leaders who could win from any constituency. They are the Maharani of Gwalior and Ramsingh Verma". Verma lost the election, being defeated by the communist candidate Homi F. Daji and finishing in second place with 89,389 votes (38.94%). Verma's loss shattered the image of him as the all-powerful union boss in Indore, and paved way for tensions between Verma, Dravid and Tiwari. As Verma retreated from parliamentary politics, he sought to consolidate his hold over the union.

== Verma-Dravid split ==
In 1963 Verma allegedly entered into a secret deal with R.C. Jall (representing mill owner interests), whereby a 'four-loom system' would be introduced (the 'four-loom system' entailed higher pay managing more looms, but the introduction of the system also implied the dismissal of thousands of workers). Dravid and Tiwari vehemetly opposed the deal, and as Labour Minister Dravid took steps to introduce legislation that would allow fired workers to seek assistance in courts even without the assistance of the Verma-led IMMS. After the Verma-Jall pact, Tiwari began raising concerns on Verma's behaviour. Tiwari's critique centred around alleged behavioural issues of Verma during the preparations of a June 1963 exhibition of the Mahila Vikas Mandir (a women's organization linked to IMMS). Verma responded by organizing a number of fierce public meetings, challenging the reputation of Tiwari. On June 5, 1963 Verma brought a no-confidence motion to remove Tiwari as the IMMS secretary. Verma failed to get enough votes to oust Tiwari at the June 5, 1963 meeting, but managed to get a committee formed (stacked with Verma confidants) to investigate Tiwari.

On June 23, 1963 Verma organized an IMMS Pratinidhi Mandal (Delegates Meeting), seeking to oust Tiwari as IMMS secretary. The meeting decided to expel Tiwari from the union. During the ensuing months there were violent clashes between Verma and Tiwari supporters. Initially it appeared that Verma had the upper hand in the conflict, and Verma controlled Shram Shibir (the IMMS headquarters). But Tiwari's influence among the Indore textile workers gradually grew. On December 13, 1963 Tiwari led a public rally of 5,000 workers to the gates of Shram Shibir, demanding the payment of a bonus and shouting anti-Verma slogans.

== Ousted ==
The central leadership of the Indian National Trade Union Congress (INTUC) sought to mediate between the warring Indore factions, sending Kashi Nath Pandey as the arbitrator. On January 19, 1964, the day that Pandey was set to arrive, the Verma faction was organizing a Pratinidhi Sabha (Assembly of Delegates). Tiwari on the other hand mobilized 7,000 workers to the streets, blocking traffic. The rally was the largest public gathering of the IMMS factional conflict. The Dravid-Tiwari faction besieged Shram Shibir, which Pandey had reportedly entered through a rear door. Pandey came out of the gates to speak with the protestors. The January 19, 1964 showed to the INTUC central leadership that it was Dravid and Tiwari that had a real mass base in Indore, which tipped the scales to their favour. The central leadership intervened, and Verma resigned from his post as IMMS president. In February 1964 the central leadership of INTUC dissolved the INTUC Madhya Pradesh and IMMS committees. Dravid was installed as the new president of INTUC Madhya Pradesh State Committee and Tiwari was installed as the new president of IMMS.

== 1972 by-election ==
Verma returned to the Lok Sabha in a June 4, 1972, by-election for the Indore seat, held after Prakash Chandra Sethi's resignation. Verma obtained 79,967 votes, against 64,356 for Kalyan Jain of the Socialist Party 3,740 votes for independent candidate P. Jat and 1,667 votes for independent candidate V. Mittal.
