= Gangaram Tiwari =

Indian politician and trade unionist

Gangaram Tiwari (born 1920) was an Indian politician and trade unionist. Tiwari was an active organizer of the Indore Mill Mazdoor Sangh (IMMS), a union of textile workers in Indore, in the 1940s and 1950s. He was a Member of the Legislative Assembly of Madhya Pradesh from 1962 to 1972, and served as Minister for Public Works and Minister of Labour and Housing in the state government.

== Youth ==
Gangaram Tiwari was born in Inayati village (Karauli State) on December 25, 1920, the son of Ramprasad Tiwari. He hailed from a Kanyakubja Brahmin family from Uttar Pradesh. His family were kathavachaks, folk musicians who performed bhajans (hymns) and musical story-telling rooted in Hindu religious traditions. Growing up in humble conditions, he was unable to finish his secondary education.

He took part in the 1941 Kotawali Todo movement. Tiwari also took part in the 1942 Quit India movement. He was arrested and sentenced to 6 years of rigorous imprisonment. In jail Tiwari befriended trade unionists V.V. Dravid and Ramsingh Bhai Verma, who recruited Tiwari to their cause. Tiwari was held at Indore and Mandleshwar jails between August 20, 1942 and November 29, 1943, being released after 15 months of imprisonment.

== Indore labour leader and local Congress politician ==
After being released from jail Tiwari helped Dravid and Verma to rebuild the Indore Mill Mazdoor Sangh trade union of textile workers in Indore. Tiwari emerged as the most important of the second-tier leaders of the IMMS, playing a key role in field organizing and political education. In his role as IMMS labour organizer he benefited from being familiar with public performances from his family upbringing. Workers appreciated his use of humour in speeches.

Tiwari was the Indian workers delegate at the 1954 International Labour Conference in Geneva.

Ahead of the 1955 municipal election, Tiwari was active in the Mohalla Sudhar Samiti movement which was an initiative to build an IMMS-linked parallel Congress organization to seize the Indore City Congress Committee. Tiwari was installed as the Indore City Congress Committee president in 1955, and retained the role in 1856.

Tiwari contested the labour seat (Indore City East) in the 1957 Madhya Pradesh Legislative Assembly election. Tiwari was defeated by communist candidate Homi F. Daji, finishing in second place with 10,903 votes (39.50%). Tiwari was the sole Congress Party candidate defeated in Indore. Daji won in 39 out of 58 polling stations, with similar vote-shares in both labour and non-labour areas.

== 1962 elections and split with Verma ==
Tiwari won the Indore City East seat in the 1962 Madhya Pradesh Legislative Assembly election, obtaining 18,617 votes (48.80%). In parallel Verma had contested the Indore Lok Sabha (parliament) seat, and lost. Tiwari got more votes than Verma in the Indore labour area. After Verma's parliamentary bid failure, conflict emerged between Verma and Dravid-Tiwari factions in IMMS.

An issue that aggravated conflict between Verma and Dravid-Tiwari was a secret deal struck between Verma and R.C. Jall (representing mill owner interests), whereby a 'four-loom system' would be introduced (the 'four-loom system' entailed higher pay managing more looms, but the introduction of the system also implied the dismissal of thousands of workers). Dravid and Tiwari vehemetly opposed the deal, and as Labour Minister Dravid took steps to introduce legislation that would allow fired workers to seek assistance in courts even without the assistance of the Verma-led IMMS.

After the Verma-Jall pact, Tiwari began raising concerns on Verma's behaviour. Tiwari's critique centred around alleged behavioural issues of Verma during the preparations of a June 1963 exhibition of the Mahila Vikas Mandir (a women's organization linked to IMMS). Verma responded by organizing a number of fierce public meetings, challenging the reputation of Tiwari. There were four key accusations raised against Tiwari - that he conspired with leading communists, that he mixed religion and politics (by making references to the Bhagavad Gita on morals, including in the attacks against Verma), that he had failed to pay his dues from his Member of Legislative Assembly salary to the union and that he had defamed Verma by saying the latter had consorted with girls ahead of the Mahila Vikas Mandir exhibit (and managed to circulate the claims, via communist interlocutors, to the leftist weekly newspaper Sputnik). On June 5, 1963 Verma brought a no-confidence motion to remove Tiwari as the IMMS secretary. Verma failed to get enough votes to oust Tiwari at the June 5, 1963 meeting, but managed to get a committee formed (stacked with Verma confidants) to investigate Tiwari.

On June 23, 1963 Verma organized an IMMS Pratinidhi Mandal (Delegates Meeting), seeking to oust Tiwari as IMMS secretary. Tiwari himself was allowed to be present at the meetings, but others seen as Tiwari confidants were blocked from participating. Fourteen accusations against Tiwari were read out at the meeting, with Tiwari's personal diary (which had been stolen the previous week) being used as evidence. The meeting decided to expel Tiwari from the union. Tiwari responded by going to the Industrial Court, which issued a stay order on Tiwari's expulsion from the IMMS. The court ordered that Tiwari remain as the IMMS secretary until the Court had taken a decision.

During the ensuing months there were violent clashes between Verma and Tiwari supporters. Initially it appeared that Verma had the upper hand in the conflict, and Verma controlled Shram Shibir (the IMMS headquarters). But Tiwari's influence among the Indore textile workers gradually grew. On December 13, 1963 Tiwari led a public rally of 5,000 workers to the gates of Shram Shibir, demanding the payment of a bonus and shouting anti-Verma slogans.

The central leadership of the Indian National Trade Union Congress (INTUC) sought to mediate between the warring Indore factions, sending Kashi Nath Pandey as the arbitrator. On January 19, 1964, the day that Pandey was set to arrive, the Verma faction was organizing a Pratinidhi Sabha (Assembly of Delegates). Tiwari on the other hand mobilized 7,000 workers to the streets, blocking traffic. The rally was the largest public gathering of the IMMS factional conflict. The Dravid-Tiwari faction besieged Shram Shibir, which Pandey had reportedly entered through a rear door. Pandey came out of the gates to speak with the protestors. The January 19, 1964 showed to the INTUC central leadership that it was Dravid and Tiwari that had a real mass base in Indore, which tipped the scales to their favour. The central leadership intervened, and Verma resigned from his post as IMMS president. In February 1964 the central leadership of INTUC dissolved the INTUC Madhya Pradesh and IMMS committees. Dravid was installed as the new president of INTUC Madhya Pradesh State Committee and Tiwari was installed as the new president of IMMS.

From 1963 onward Tiwari emerged as the protégé of the new Chief Minister Dwarka Prasad Mishra (also a Kanyakubja Brahmin) within the Indore labour movement. As Mishra side-lined Dravid in favour of Tiwari, tensions would gradually grow between Dravid and Tiwari (eventually leading to the pro-Congress Indore labour movement being divided into three factions - Verma, Dravid and Tiwari factions). After the ousting of Verma from the IMMS leadership and Tiwari having become an ally of Mishra, Tiwari was made a trustee of the Indore Improvement Trust in 1963 (and remained in this role until 1967). Tiwari was the first sitting Member of Legislative Assembly to hold this position.

During his tenures as Member of Legislative Assembly Tiwari studied to complete his high school and college credits, eventually obtaining a M.A. degree in Hindi literature from the University of Indore.

On November 9, 1966, in the wake of the anti-cow slaughter riot in Delhi, Tiwari and the Rashtriya Swayamsevak Sangh prant sanghchalak Ram Narayan Shastri led 5,000 strong gauraksha ('cow protection') rally in Indore.

== Minister ==
Tiwari was the sole Indore INTUC faction candidate in the 1967 Madhya Pradesh Legislative Assembly election. Tiwari won the Indore labour seat (Indore-II), obtaining 19,735 votes (43.87%). Tiwari narrowly defeated the prominent communist Mill Mazdoor Union leader Harisingh. Notably, Tiwari had wished for a safer seat to contest. He ended up being the sole Congress Party candidate winning in Indore. Tiwari was sworn in as Minister of Public Works Department (Buildings and Roads) on March 8, 1967.

Tiwari held various leadership roles in the Indian National Congress and INTUC - He served as general secretary of INTUC in Madhya Pradesh, and was a member of the District Congress Committee, Madhya Pradesh Congress Committee and the All India Congress Committee. Tiwari became the Indore City Congress Committee president again in 1968 and 1969. He would go on to be named Minister of Labour and Housing in the Madhya Pradesh state cabinet. The relationship between Dravid and Tiwari worsened after the latter was named Labour Minister. Reportedly Tiwari gathered INTUC leaders at his ministerial residence in Bhopal for an informal meeting to plot the removal of Dravid from the post as president of INTUC in Madhya Pradesh.

== Fall from grace ==
On the eve of December 23, 1969 Tiwari went to the house of a female nurse in the Heavy Electricals Township in Bhopal. The events that followed would be subject to dispute. Reportedly police rescued Tiwari from the site the next morning, as community members were lynching him after he had assaulted the nurse. The nurse filed a complaint against Tiwari at the Govindpura police station at Bhopal in the morning of December 24, 1969. In her statement, the nurse stated that Tiwari had threatened her with engineering his dismissal from the BHEL Hospital unless she had sex with him.

Another complaint filed with the police, done by a group of trade unionists, claimed that Tiwari was being blackmailed and had been tricked into going to the house through a fake Christmas Eve party invitation. Later the nurse changed her narrative in an filed before the Additional Civil Judge of Indore, stating that her complaint lodged at the Bhopal police had been done under pressure. She stated that her house had been stormed by two armed individuals who had forced her to be photographed with Tiwari in a 'compromising position' at gunpoint. The incident became publicly known as the 'nurse episode'.

Tiwari tendered his resignation on January 2, 1970. According to the magazine Link Tiwari had been reluctant to tender his resignation, but had been pressured by others in the government. Chief Minister S.C. Shukla publicly expressed that he suspected that Tiwari had been framed by political opponents. The Chief Minister did not accept Tiwari's resignation, pending the conclusion of the investigation into the case. On January 9, 1970 the opposition brought a no-confidence motion against the Shukla cabinet over the nurse episode, as well as other issues of complaints of corruption and misuse of funds. There were rumours that Cooperation Minister K.N. Pradhan, who had previously brokered a truce between Dravid and Tiwari, had been the architect of the 'nurse episode' plot.

Tensions between Tiwari and Dravid eventually led to an open split in INTUC. Tiwari was accused of fomenting labour unrest in Ujjain, where INTUC had entered into an agreement with the textile mill owners. At a INTUC meeting in Nagda in early June 1970 Tiwari and four others walked out in protest. Tiwari then organized a parallel session, and accused Dravid of dictatorial management of INTUC and being opposed to Indira Gandhi. Dravid held a press conference in Bhopal, accusing Tiwari of anti-labour and anti-INTUC policies. But as Tiwari's group was limited to Ujjain, the national INTUC leadership never gave it any recognition.

Eventually Chief Minister Shukla had to cave to the pressure from the Dravid-led INTUC to get Tiwari out of the cabinet. In May 1971 Tiwari was removed from the post of Minister of Labour. K.N. Pradhan was given the Labour portfolio.

== Bibliography ==
- Tiwari, Gangaram. इंदौर के मज़दूर आंदोलन का संक्षिप्त इतिहास (Short History of the Labour Movement of Indore). Indore Mill Mazdoor Sangh Prakashan, 1967
