= L.I.G. Colony =

- Suburb
- Location in Madhya Pradesh, India L.I.G. Colony (India)
- Country: India
- State: Madhya Pradesh
- District: Indore District
- City: Indore

Government
  - Type: Municipal Corporation
  - Body: Indore Municipal Corporation (IMC)
  - Mayor: Malini Laxmansingh Gaur
  - District Collector: Manish Singh, IAS

Languages
  - Official: Hindi
- Time zone: UTC+5:30 (IST)
- PIN: 452001
- Vehicle registration: MP-09
- Lok Sabha constituency: Indore
- Vidhan Sabha constituency: Indore-5
- Website: imcindore.mp.gov.in

LIG is a residential locality within Indore, Madhya Pradesh, India. Started by the Indore Development Authority. Real estate prices have shot up and are comparable to the posh areas of Indore, in large part because of the continued boom of immigrants.

Elected Member of the Legislative Assembly:Mahendra Hardia

== Geography ==
The LIG Colony is divided into 15 Sectors.

- House No. 1 to 500 Sec-A
- House No. 1 to 300 Sec-B
- House No. 1 to 300 Sec-C
- House No. 1 to 200 Sec-D
- House No. 1 to 150 Sec-E
- House No. 1 to 150 Sec-F
- House No. 1 to 150 Sec-G
- House No. 1 to 100 Sec-H, Sec-I, Sec-J, Sec-K and Sec-L.
- House No. 1 to 50 Sec-M
- House No. 1 to 30 Sec-M1
- House No. 1 to 20 Sec-M2

There are a number of restaurants and Bars in the area. The locality consists POLICE government and IDA Flats but also some societies like Taj Society, Rajni Parisar, Gulshan Bag etc. The rapid urbanisation of Indore has led to mushrooming of such societies all over the city, noted societies are now coming out at . There are also unconfirmed reports of redeveloping the Indore, The major demographics consist of well educated service class people plus businessman. LIG has Christian Eminent School which is very popular school in Indore

Neighbouring suburbs: Vijay Nagar, Patnipura, Palasia
Arterial Roads: Agra-Bombay Road (NH 52)

== Politics ==
LIG Colony area falls under the Indore-5 Assembly Constituency in Indore District. The current elected Member is Mahendra Hardia from the BJP.

== Transport ==
The Indore Junction railway station is the main junction to catch trains. Public transport such as autos, taxis, magic-vans, city buses are readily available.

LIG Colony being located on the arterial A.B. Road (Agra–Bombay Road NH 52), several City Bus routes serve the area, with fares ranging from ₹10.00 to ₹25.00 or even more depending on distance. Bus Routes passing by main LIG Square are

S. No.	Route No.	Start	End
1	iBus	Rajiv Gandhi Circle	Dewas Naka
2	15	Sangam Nagar	LIG Square
3	17A	Railway Station	Vyash Khedi

== Places of Interest ==
- LIG is known for its popular LIG Gurudwara which has its own beauty. It is one of the best infrastructure of Indore in terms of devotional places.
- The area also has Dainik Bhaskar complex popularly known as Bhaskar, and fish market close to the Gurudwara.
- The area has one CHL Apollo Hospital, Infertility Centre, Banks like State Bank of Indore, Bank of Baroda, Axis, LIC Corporate Office and houses for many new built Infrastructures also.
