= Nirbhay (disambiguation) =

Nirbhay may refer to:

== People ==
- Nirbhay Gujjar
- Nirbhay Wadhwa
- Nirbhay Singh (disambiguation), several people
- Nirbhay Pal Sharma
- Nirbhay Sharma
- Nirbhay Singh Sisodiya
- Nirbhay Singh Patel
- Manoj Nirbhay Singh Patel

== Other ==
- Nirbhay (missile)
- Nirbhay (film)
