= Homi F. Daji =

Indian politician

Homi Daji

Member of the Madhya Pradesh Legislative Assembly
- In office 1957–1962
- Succeeded by: Gangaram Tiwari
- Constituency: Indore City East
- In office 1972–1977
- Preceded by: Gangaram Tiwari
- Succeeded by: Yagya Datt Sharma
- Constituency: Indore-2

Member of Parliament, Lok Sabha
- In office 1962–1967
- Preceded by: Kanhaiyalal Khadiwala
- Succeeded by: Prakash Chandra Sethi
- Constituency: Indore, Madhya Pradesh

Personal details
- Born: 29 September 1926 Bombay, Bombay Presidency, British India
- Died: 14 May 2009 (aged 82) Indore, Madhya Pradesh
- Party: Communist Party of India
- Spouse: Perin Daji (m. 1950)
- Children: 1 Daughter & 1 Son
- Parent: Framroze Daji (father)
- Education: Holkar Science College, Indore
- Occupation: Politician, Advocate
- As of 28 June, 2018 Source: ["Biodata". Lok Sabha.]

Homi F. Daji (5 September 1926 – 14 May 2009) was a member of the 3rd Lok Sabha of India. He represented the Indore constituency of Madhya Pradesh and was a member of the Communist Party of India.

== Personal life ==
Daji hailed from the Parsi community. Born in Bombay, he was the son of Framroze Daji. He grew up in poverty. Nevertheless, he managed to study at Holkar College in Indore and at Agra University, and obtained M.A. and LLB degrees. He married Perin Daji on 21 May 1950. The couple had one son and one daughter, both of whom died at an early age.

Daji served as a member of the senate of Vikram University.

== State legislator ==
Daji contested the Indore City B seat in the 1952 Madhya Bharat Legislative Assembly election. He finished in second place with 2,185 votes (10.89%) and was thus unsuccessful. The constituency covered parts of southern Indore, where the 26-year old CPI candidate won more votes from areas such as Gadi Ada (with large Dalit and other lower caste electorates) and Muslim mahallas. The relatively unknown Daji obtained more votes than the prominent Hindu Mahasabha leader G.V. Oke.

Daji was elected to the Madhya Pradesh Legislative Assembly from the Indore City East constituency in the 1957 Madhya Pradesh Legislative Assembly election. He obtained 16,702 votes (60.50%). The constituency was seen as the 'labour seat' of the city. Daji, leading the Mazdoor Union, defeated the Indore Mill Mazdoor Sangh general secretary Gangaram Tiwari.

== Parliamentarian ==
He was elected to the Lok Sabha (lower house of the parliament of India) from the Indore constituency in the 1962 Indian general election. Whilst Daji was known as a communist leader, he contested on an independent ticket. Daji obtained 95,682 votes (41.68%). In the 3rd Lok Sabha, Daji was a member of the committees on Public Undertakings and Subordinate Legislation. In 1967 he was named a member of the National Commission on Labour, the Study Group on Industrial Relations (Western Region).

Daji lost the Indore seat to the Indian National Congress candidate P.C. Sethi in the 1967 Indian general election. Daji finished in second place with 100,350 votes (32.54%). But whilst Sethi won in the rural areas of the constituency, Daji's vote share in the urban areas was 4.4 percent points higher than that of Sethi. Daji tried to regain the Indore seat in the 1971 Indian general election. Daji finished in third place after the Indian National Congress and Bharatiya Jan Sangh candidates. Daji obtained 64,430 votes (21.22%).

== Return to the Legislative Assembly ==
Daji re-entered the Madhya Pradesh Legislative Assembly in the 1972 election, being elected from the Indore-2 constituency. He obtained 39,154 votes (79.54%), defeating the candidates of the BJS, the Hindu Mahasabha, and a number of independents. Daji did not stand for re-election in the 1977 Legislative Assembly election.

== Later elections ==
As of 1977 Daji was the Madhya Pradesh secretary of the All India Trade Union Congress.

Daji finished in third place in the Indore Lok Sabha constituency in the 1977 Indian general election, obtaining 29,725 votes (8.45%).

In the 1980 Indian general election he contested the Bhopal Lok Sabha constituency, finishing in third place with 24,370 votes (6.31%). In the same year he finished in second place in the Indore II constituency in the 1980 Madhya Pradesh Legislative Assembly election, obtaining 15,247 votes (29.64%).

== Bhopal disaster ==
Daji referred to the 1984 Bhopal gas leak as "a callous man-made tragedy of unparalleled dimensions".

== In CPI leadership ==
As of 1987, Daji was part of the 9-member Central Executive Committee of CPI. As of 1989 Daji was a member of a number of leadership bodies of CPI; Trade Union Department, the committee for the People's Publishing House and the Lawyers' Committee in Madhya Pradesh.
