= Indore-4 Assembly constituency =

Constituency of the Madhya Pradesh legislative assembly in India

Coordinates: 22.716°N 75.887°E

Indore-4
- Constituency No. 207 for the Madhya Pradesh Legislative Assembly

Constituency details
- Country: India
- Region: Central India
- State: Madhya Pradesh
- District: Indore
- Lok Sabha constituency: Indore
- Established: 1967
- Reservation: None

Member of Legislative Assembly
- 16th Madhya Pradesh Legislative Assembly
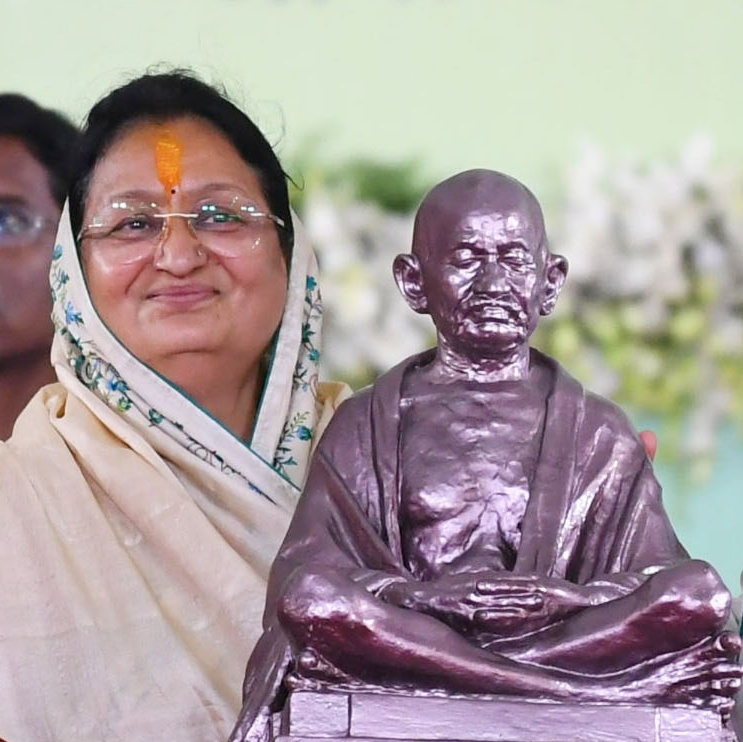
- Incumbent Malini Gaur
- Party: Bharatiya Janata Party
- Elected year: 2023
- Preceded by: Laxman Singh Gaur

Indore-4 Assembly constituency is one of the 230 Vidhan Sabha (Legislative Assembly) constituencies of Madhya Pradesh state in central India.

== Overview ==
Indore-4 Assembly constituency is one of the 8 Vidhan Sabha constituencies located in Indore district which comes under Indore (Lok Sabha constituency). The constituency includes Wards 22, 23, 46-56 and 66 of Indore city.

== Members of the Legislative Assembly ==
Year	Name	Party
1967	Yagyadatt Sharma	Independent
1972	Narayan Prasad Shukla	Indian National Congress
1977	Vallabh Sharma	Janata Party
1980	Yagyadatt Sharma	Indian National Congress (I)
1985	Nandlal Mata	Indian National Congress
1990	Kailash Vijayvargiya	Bharatiya Janata Party
1993	Laxman Singh Gaur	Bharatiya Janata Party
1998	Laxman Singh Gaur	Bharatiya Janata Party
2003	Laxman Singh Gaur	Bharatiya Janata Party
2008	Malini Gaur	Bharatiya Janata Party
2013	Malini Gaur	Bharatiya Janata Party
2018	Malini Gaur	Bharatiya Janata Party
2023	Malini Gaur	Bharatiya Janata Party

== Election results ==
=== 2023 ===
2023 Madhya Pradesh Legislative Assembly election: Indore-4
Party	Candidate	Votes	%	±%
BJP	Malini Gaur	118,870	68.09	+6.97
INC	P. L. Raja Mandhwani	49,033	28.09	−7.38
AAP	Dr.Piyush Joshi	3,374	1.93	+1.43
NOTA	None of the above	1,986	1.14	−0.11
Majority		69,837	40.0	+14.35
Turnout		174,583	72.85	+5.15
BJP hold		Swing		

=== 2018 ===
2018 Madhya Pradesh Legislative Assembly election: Indore-4
Party	Candidate	Votes	%	±%
BJP	Malini Gaur	102,673	61.12	
INC	Surjeet Singh Ujagar Singh Chadda	59,583	35.47	
NOTA	None of the above	2,098	1.25	
Majority		43,090	25.65	
Turnout		167,993	67.7	
BJP gain from		Swing		

=== 1998 ===
1998 Madhya Pradesh Legislative Assembly election: Indore-4
Party	Candidate	Votes	%	±%
BJP	Lakshman Singh Gaur	65,137	55.75	
INC	Govind Manghani (Gopbhai)	49,160	42.08	
BSP	Vimal Dagar Valmiki	728	0.62	
Independent	Satendra Singh (Santi)	481	0.41	
Independent	Sachin Neema (Sachha)	432	0.37	
Majority		15,977	13.67	
Turnout		116,828	51.96	
BJP hold		Swing		

== See also ==
- Indore
- Indore (Lok Sabha constituency)
