= Narayan Prasad Shukla =

Indian politician (1929–2014)

- नारायण प्रसाद शुक्ला
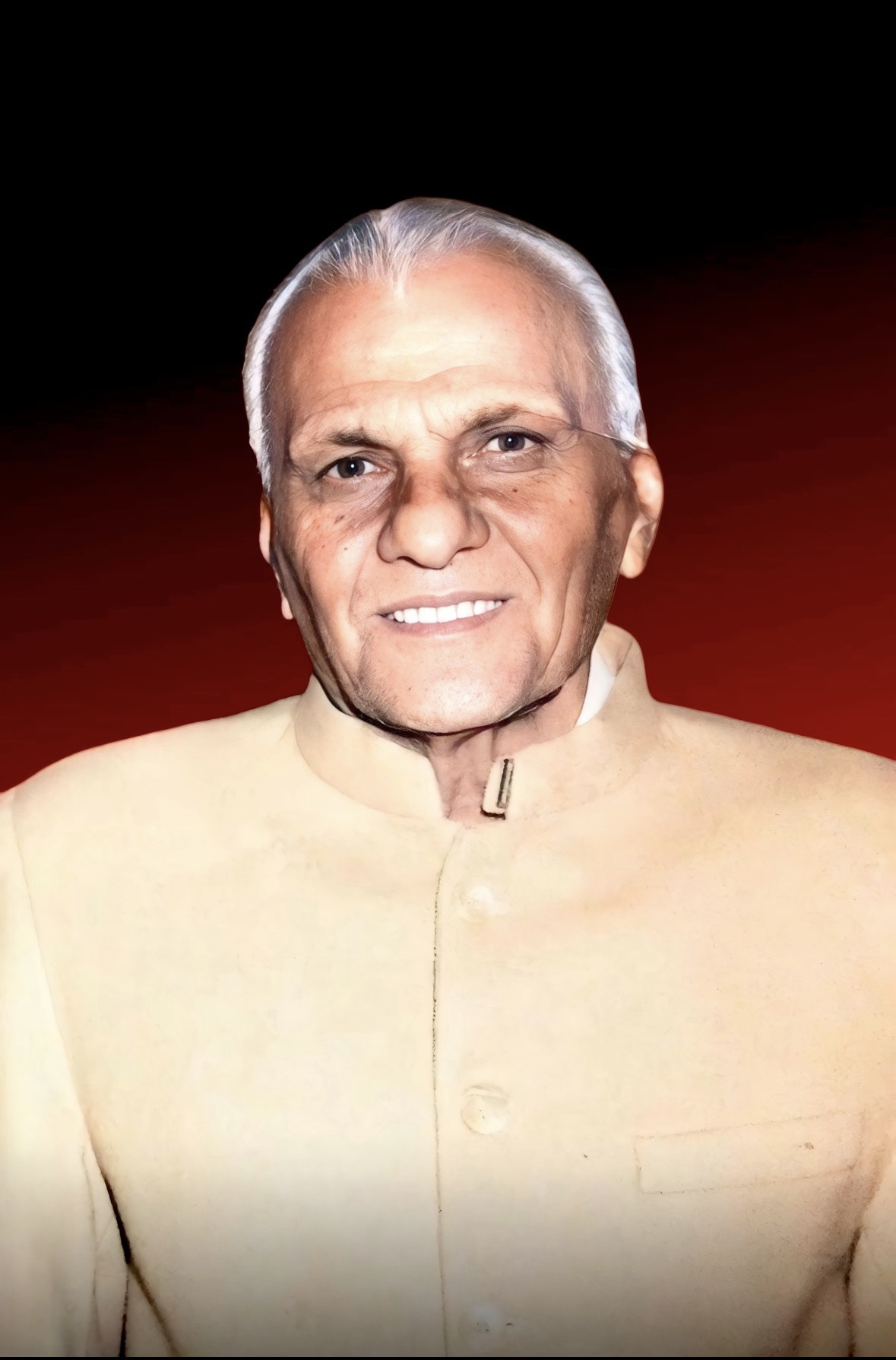

Deputy Speaker of the Legislative Assembly of Madhya Pradesh
- In office 25 March 1972 – 8 January 1976
- Preceded by: Ram Kishore Shukla
- Constituency: Indore-4

Minister of Home Affairs, Minister of Urban Development, Minister of Tourism Madhya Pradesh
- In office 8 January 1976 – 30 April 1977
- Constituency: Indore-4

Mayor of Indore
- In office 1964–1965

Deputy Mayor of Indore
- In office 1962–1963

Member of the Madhya Pradesh Legislative Assembly
- In office 1972–1977
- Preceded by: Yagya Datt Sharma
- Succeeded by: Vallabh Sharma
- Constituency: Indore-4

Personal details
- Born: November 10, 1929 Sagar, Madhya Pradesh, India
- Died: June 15, 2014 (aged 84) Indore, Madhya Pradesh, India
- Citizenship: India
- Party: Indian National Congress
- Spouse: Kusum Shukla
- Children: Shailendra Shukla, Pradeep Shukla, Archana Joshi, Sushma Thakur
- Education: Master of Arts
- Alma mater: Holkar Science College
- Occupation: Politician, Journalist

Narayan Prasad Shukla (10 November 1929 – 15 June 2014) was an Indian politician, journalist, and social activist from Madhya Pradesh. A senior leader of the Indian National Congress, he served as Mayor of Indore Municipal Corporation, Member of the Madhya Pradesh Legislative Assembly representing the Indore-4 Assembly constituency. He was Minister of Home Affairs, Minister of Urban Development and Minister of Tourism in Shyama Charan Shukla's cabinet, and Deputy Speaker of the Madhya Pradesh Legislative Assembly between 1972 and 1976. He also served as Deputy Mayor of Indore for over a decade and was the leader of the Narmada Maiya Chalo movement, a major public agitation addressing Indore’s water supply crisis. He was widely associated with urban development initiatives, public movements, cultural institutions, and efforts to strengthen sports infrastructure in the state.

== Early life and education ==
Narayan Prasad Shukla was born in Sagar, Madhya Pradesh. During his student years, Shukla was actively involved in student politics while studying at Holkar Science College, Indore. He was elected as the President of Holkar Science College, a role through which he emerged as a prominent student leader and laid the foundation for his later involvement in public life. Before embarking on his political career, Shukla worked in journalism, serving as an editor for National Herald. He also worked as the Editor-in-Chief at Indore Samachar Press. and United News of India, where he was associated with editorial and reporting assignments during the early phase of his professional career.Shukla's political journey began with his election as a Member of the Madhya Pradesh Legislative Assembly from the Indore-4 Assembly constituency in 1972 Madhya Pradesh Legislative Assembly election. He was appointed as the Deputy Speaker of the Madhya Pradesh Legislative Assembly on 28 July 1972, serving until 7 January 1976. He has served as the Minister of State in the Shyamcharan Shukla ministry from 8 January 1976 to 30 April 1977. He had served as Mayor of Indore for two consecutive terms in 1964 and 1965. He completed his Master of Arts in English. During his political career, Shukla was regarded as a close associate of Dwarka Prasad Mishra, former Chief Minister of Madhya Pradesh, and worked closely with him on organizational and developmental initiatives in the state. Contemporary accounts and later retrospectives describe Mishra as having acknowledged Shukla’s political maturity and administrative approach, particularly in matters related to urban development and public movements. Shukla was also associated with senior policymakers in Mishra’s circle, including Brajesh Mishra, with whom he is described in regional sources as sharing a close personal and professional association.

== Political career ==
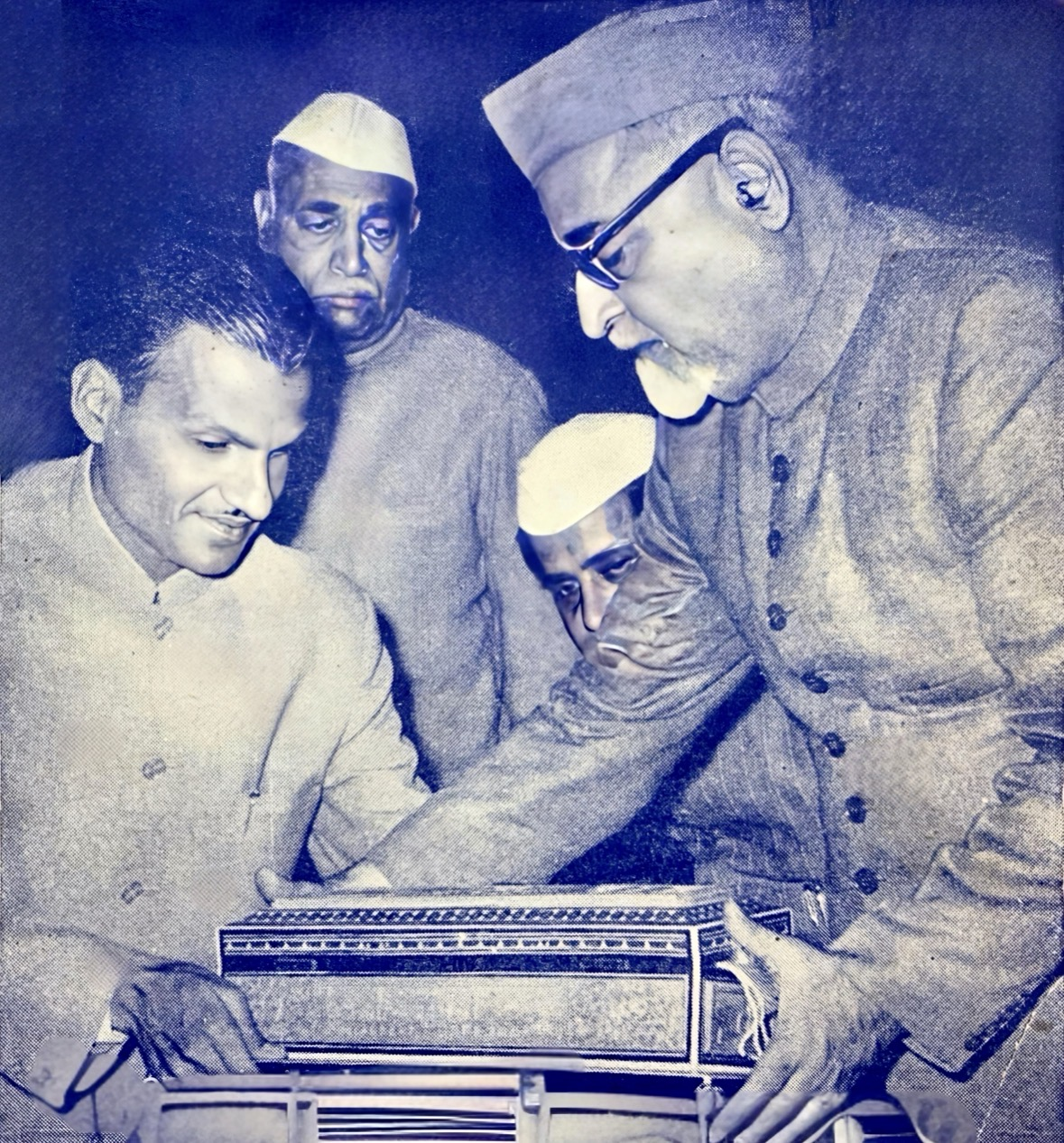
Shukla with President Zakir Husain and Mishri Lal Gangwal, former Chief Minister of Madhya Bharat.

Narayan Prasad Shukla was a senior leader of the Indian National Congress and an influential figure in the political history of Indore and Madhya Pradesh. He began his public life through student and civic movements and later served as a councillor and Mayor of Indore, becoming one of the youngest individuals to hold the office.

During his tenure in municipal and state politics, Shukla was associated with initiatives focused on urban development, civic administration, and public infrastructure, including movements related to water supply in Indore. He played a role in efforts leading to the establishment of Indore University, later renamed Devi Ahilya Vishwavidyalaya, and was associated with the government acquisition and preservation of the historic Rajwada Palace.

Shukla later served as a member of the Madhya Pradesh Legislative Assembly, held ministerial responsibilities in the state government, and was elected Deputy Speaker of the Assembly.

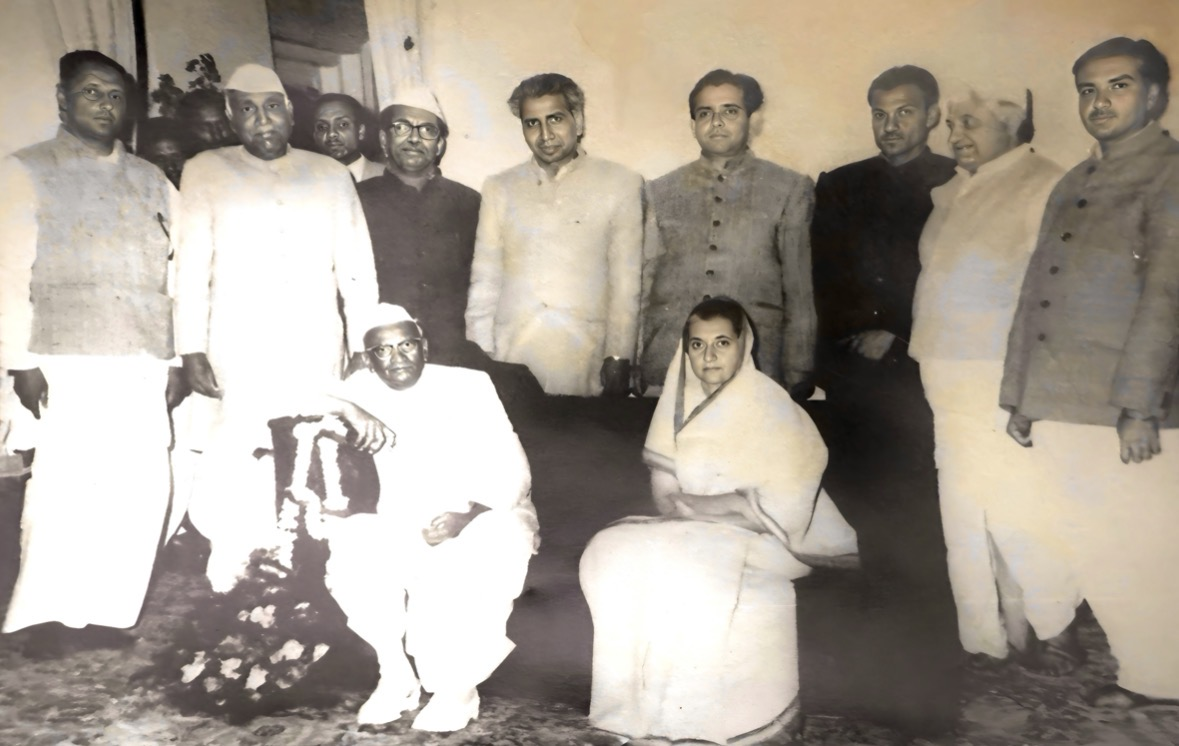
Shukla with Prime Minister Indira Gandhi, Chief Minister Dwarka Prasad Mishra and Prakash Chandra Sethi at Shukla's residence.

Between 1970 and 1972, Shukla served as one of the General Secretaries of the Madhya Pradesh–Chhattisgarh Pradesh Congress Committee. He was among four leaders appointed to the position during the tenure of Indira Gandhi, then Prime Minister of India, and was associated with organisational responsibilities within the party, including coordination of political activities and electoral strategy. Contemporary accounts also note his role in candidate selection processes and his subsequent appointment as election in-charge for Khargone district during Assembly and organisational elections. He became Mayor of Indore at the age of 27 and is regarded as the youngest Mayor in the history of the Indore Municipal Corporation.

== Personal life and family ==
He was born in Sagar, Madhya Pradesh, India. He was married to Kusum Shukla, and the couple had four children—two sons and two daughters. His sons are Shailendra Shukla, who is engaged in business, and Pradeep Shukla, who works as a journalist. His daughters are Archana Joshi and Sushma Thakur.

In addition to his political career, Shukla served as Chairman of the Shri Madhya Bharat Hindi Sahitya Samiti, Indore, an institution whose foundation stone was laid by Mahatma Gandhi, and was associated with initiatives promoting Hindi literature and cultural activities in the region.

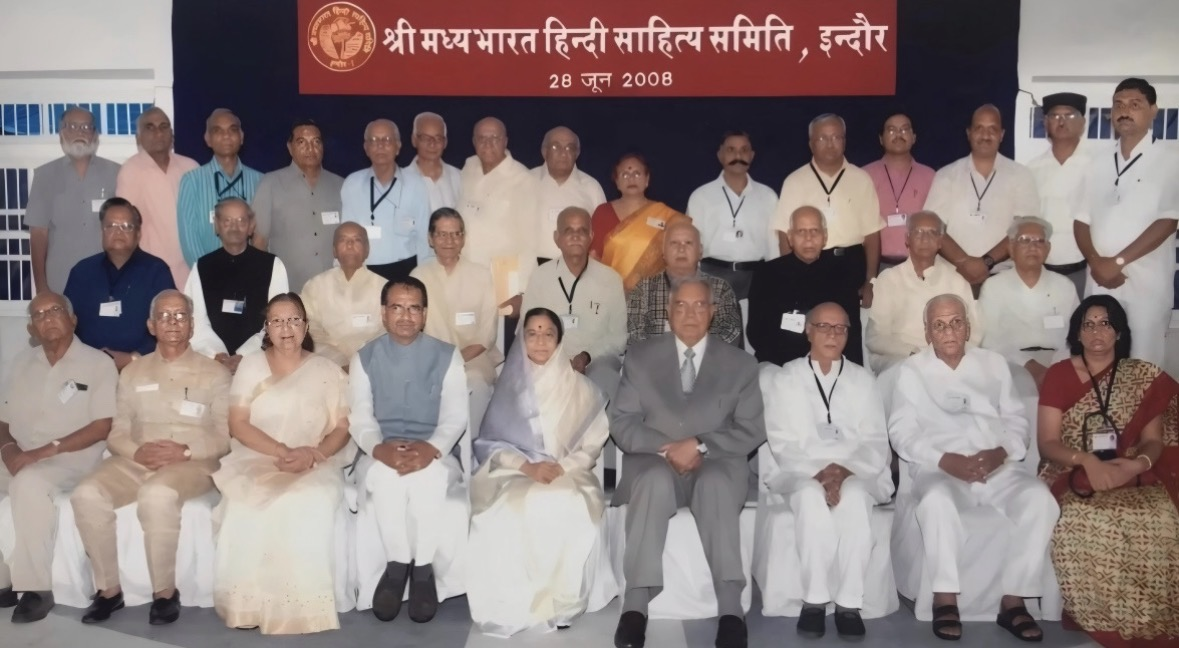
Shukla with President Pratibha Patil, Governor Balram Jakhar, Chief Minister Shivraj Singh Chouhan and Sumitra Mahajan at centenary of Shree Madhya Bharat Hindi Sahitya Samiti.

Members of his family have also been involved in public service and social initiatives. His grandson Aditya Shukla has been associated with international and social development initiatives, including work related to education and youth leadership, and has been featured in national and international media. Other grandchildren, including Apoorv Shukla and Shailja Shukla, have been associated with social and organizational activities linked to the Narayani initiatives.

== Legacy ==
Narayan Prasad Shukla is remembered as a development-oriented and principled political leader whose contributions significantly influenced Indore’s civic growth and political culture. Contemporary accounts and retrospectives highlight his role in urban development initiatives, legislative functioning, and public movements, as well as his reputation for ethical conduct in public life. In regional discourse, he is often described as one of the figures who helped shape Indore’s modern civic and administrative framework.

Elements of this public-service legacy have continued through subsequent generations of his family. His grandson, Aditya Shukla, has been engaged in international social-development work, including assignments with the United Nations, and currently serves as President of the Global Youth Leadership Initiative.

== Narmada Maiya Chalo Movement ==
Narayan Prasad Shukla played a leading role in the Narmada Maiya Chalo Movement, a public agitation conducted between 5 July and 23 August 1970, aimed at addressing Indore’s growing water crisis. During the late 1960s and early 1970s, Indore faced acute water shortages, prompting demands for a sustainable long-term solution.

Shukla, a former Mayor of Indore, emerged as a central figure in mobilizing public support for drawing water from the Narmada River to the city. The movement witnessed widespread public participation and sustained demonstrations over a period of 23 days, transforming a civic demand into a mass-based campaign.

The agitation is regarded as a significant factor in influencing government approval for the Narmada water supply project for Indore, which involved transporting water across the Vindhyachal range. The movement is frequently cited in regional accounts as a landmark episode in Indore’s urban development and water infrastructure planning.

== Death ==
Shukla died on 15 June 2014, at the age of 83 after a brief illness. He had been undergoing treatment for pneumonia in a private hospital. His last rites were performed the following day.
