= Shankar Lalwani =

Indian politician

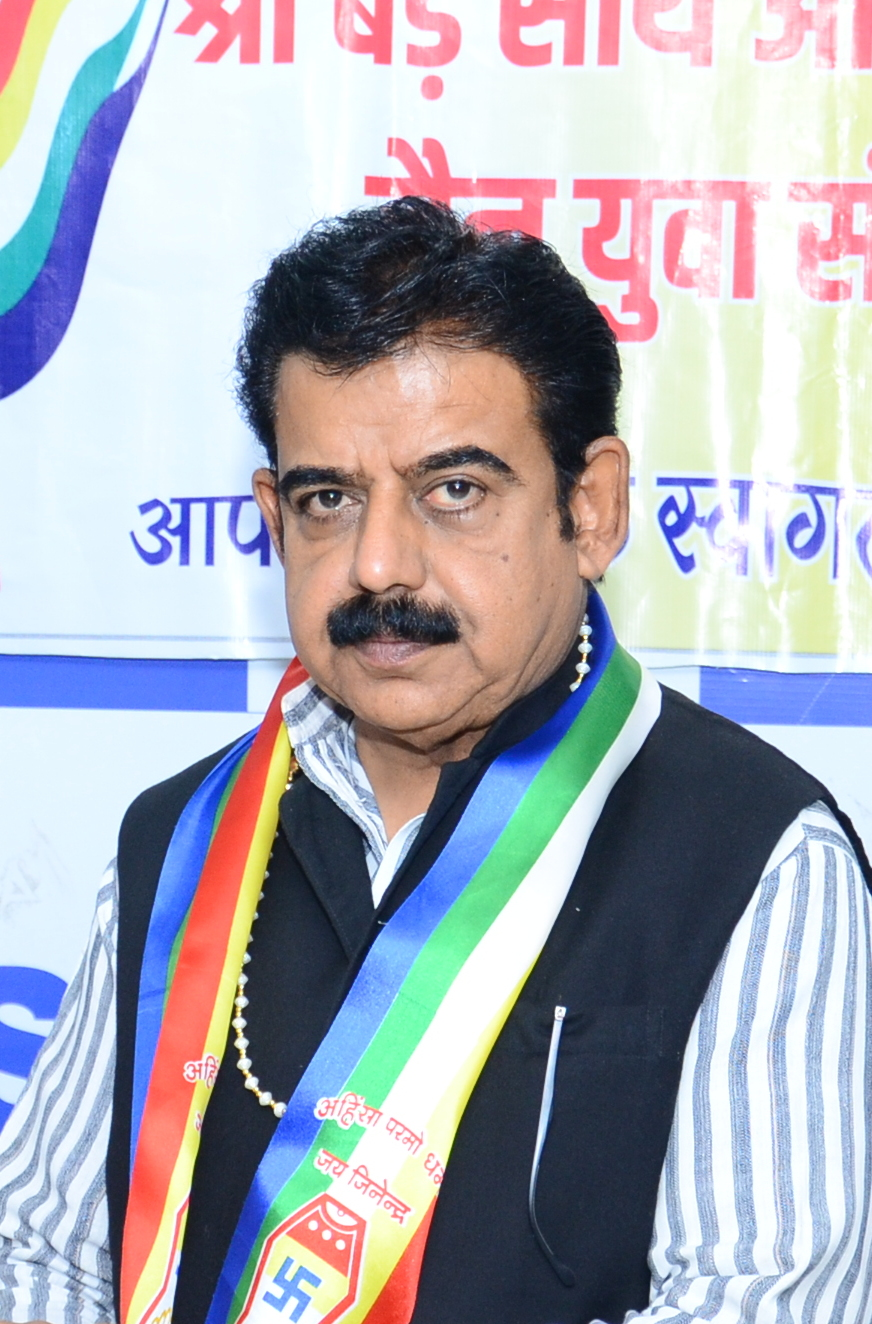
- Lalwani at Shalby Hospital, Indore

Member of Parliament, Lok Sabha
- Incumbent
- Assumed office 23 May 2019
- Preceded by: Sumitra Mahajan
- Constituency: Indore
- Majority: 10,68,569 (65.59%)

Chairman of Indore Development Authority
- In office October 2013 – 2018
- Preceded by: Prabhat Parashar
- Succeeded by: Jaypal Singh Chawda

Personal details
- Born: 16 October 1961 (age 65) Indore, Madhya Pradesh, India
- Party: Bharatiya Janata Party
- Children: 1
- Education: Veermata Jijabai Technological Institute, Mumbai (B. Tech)
- Occupation: Politician
- Profession: Businessperson; consultant
- Source

Shankar Lalwani (born 16 October 1961; Hindi pronunciation: [ʃəŋkəɾ laːlʋaːn̪iː]) is an Indian politician. A member of the Bharatiya Janata Party (BJP), Lalwani has served as a Member of Parliament in the 17th Lok Sabha from Indore since 2019. He also held previously the position of chairman in Indore Development Authority.

== Personal life ==
Lalwani was born on 16 October 1961 to Jamnadas Lalwani and Gouridevi Lalwani in Indore, Madhya Pradesh. He is a Sindhi whose family migrated from Pakistan after the Partition of India. Lalwani completed his Higher Secondary from Madhya Pradesh Board in 1978. He graduated with a B. Tech degree from Veermata Jijabai Technological Institute affiliated to University of Bombay.

Lalwani married Amita Lalwani on 10 March 1985, with whom he has a son.

== Career ==
Lalwani is the current Member of Parliament from Indore parliamentary constituency of Madhya Pradesh. He is one of the handful of politicians to have polled more than 10 lakh votes in a Lok Sabha election, having breached the barrier in May 2019. He polled more votes in 2019 than any other Lok Sabha member. His winning margin was 5 lakhs, with many candidates winning with higher margins than that, especially in Gujarat.

=== Position held ===
- 1994 - 1999: Corporator, Municipal Corporation of Indore
- 1999 - 2004: Chairman, PWD, Municipal Corporation of Indore
- 2004 - 2009: Chairperson, Municipal Corporation of Indore
- 2013 - 2018: Chairperson, Indore Development Authority
- May 2019 - present : Elected to 17th Lok Sabha
- September 2019 - present: Member, Standing Committee on Urban Development
