= Laxman Singh Gaur =

Indian politician

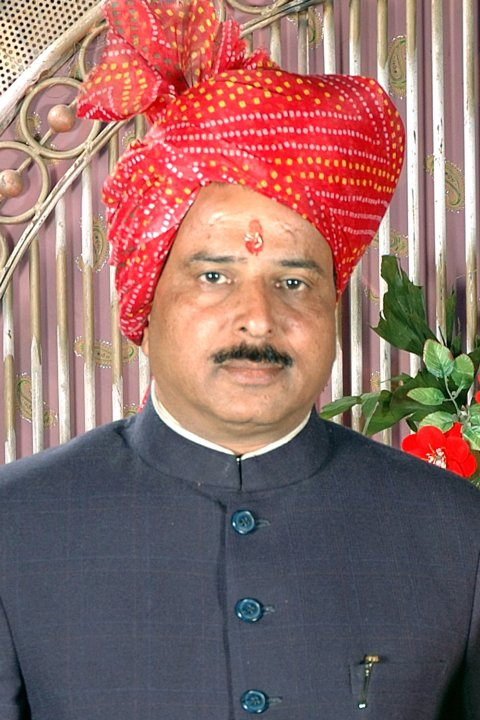

Member of Legislative Assembly, Madhya Pradesh
- In office 1993–2008
- Preceded by: Kailash Vijayvargiya
- Succeeded by: Malini Laxmansingh Gaur
- Constituency: Indore-4

Personal details
- Born: 11 July 1958 Indore, Madhya Pradesh, India
- Died: 11 February 2008 (aged 49) Dewas, Madhya Pradesh, India
- Party: Bharatiya Janata Party
- Spouse: Malini Laxmansingh Gaur (m. 1983–2008)
- Children: 3 sons
- Education: B.Com
- Profession: Politician

Laxman Singh Gaur (11 July 1958 – 11 February 2008) was an Indian politician and the higher education minister of Madhya Pradesh. He upgraded the functionality of the education system in Madhya Pradesh. He died in a car accident near Dewas on 11 February 2008.
