= Depalpur Assembly constituency =

Constituency of the Madhya Pradesh legislative assembly in India

Coordinates: 22.85°N 75.54°E

Depalpur
- Constituency No. 203 for the Madhya Pradesh Legislative Assembly

Constituency details
- Country: India
- Region: Central India
- State: Madhya Pradesh
- District: Indore
- Lok Sabha constituency: Indore
- Established: 1957
- Reservation: None

Member of Legislative Assembly
- 16th Madhya Pradesh Legislative Assembly
- Incumbent Manoj Patel
- Party: Bharatiya Janata Party
- Elected year: 2023
- Preceded by: Vishal Jagdish Patel

Depalpur Assembly constituency is one of the 230 Vidhan Sabha (Legislative Assembly) constituencies of Madhya Pradesh state in central India.

== Overview ==
Depalpur Assembly constituency is one of the 8 Vidhan Sabha constituencies located in Indore district which comes under Indore (Lok Sabha constituency).

== Members of Legislative Assembly ==
=== Madhya Bharat Legislative Assembly ===
Election	Member	Party
1952	Sajjan Singh Vishnar	Indian National Congress
1952	Khadiwala Kanahiyalal	Indian National Congress

=== Madhya Pradesh Legislative Assembly ===
Election	Member	Party
1957	Sajjan Singh Vishnar	Indian National Congress
1957	Nandial Joshi	Indian National Congress
1962	Bapusingh Ramsingh	Socialist Party
1967	B. Sabu	Indian National Congress
1972	Ramchandra Agrawal	Indian National Congress
1977	Ratan Patodi	Janata Party
1980	Nirbhay Singh Patel	Bharatiya Janata Party
1985	Rameshwar Patel	Indian National Congress
1990	Nirbhay Singh Patel	Bharatiya Janata Party
1993	Nirbhay Singh Patel	Bharatiya Janata Party
1998	Jagdish Patel	Indian National Congress
2003	Manoj Patel	Bharatiya Janata Party
2008	Satyanarayan Patel	Indian National Congress
2013	Manoj Patel	Bharatiya Janata Party
2018	Vishal Jagdish Patel	Indian National Congress
2023	Manoj Patel	Bharatiya Janata Party

== Election results ==
=== 2023 ===
2023 Madhya Pradesh Legislative Assembly election: Depalpur
Party	Candidate	Votes	%	±%
BJP	Manoj Patel	95,577	43.14	−2.52
INC	Vishal Jagdish Patel	81,879	36.96	−13.5
Independent	Rajendra Vikramsingh Choudhary	37,920	17.12	
NOTA	None of the above	1,151	0.52	−0.52
Majority		13,698	6.18	+1.38
Turnout		221,553	83.05	+0.5
BJP gain from INC		Swing		

=== 2018 ===
2018 Madhya Pradesh Legislative Assembly election: Depalpur
Party	Candidate	Votes	%	±%
INC	Vishal Jagdish Patel	94,981	50.46	
BJP	Manoj Patel	85,937	45.66	
NOTA	None of the above	1,957	1.04	
Majority		9,044	4.8	
Turnout		188,219	82.55	
INC gain from		Swing		

== See also ==
- Depalpur
- Indore
- Indore (Lok Sabha constituency)
