= Kailash Vijayvargiya =

Indian politician

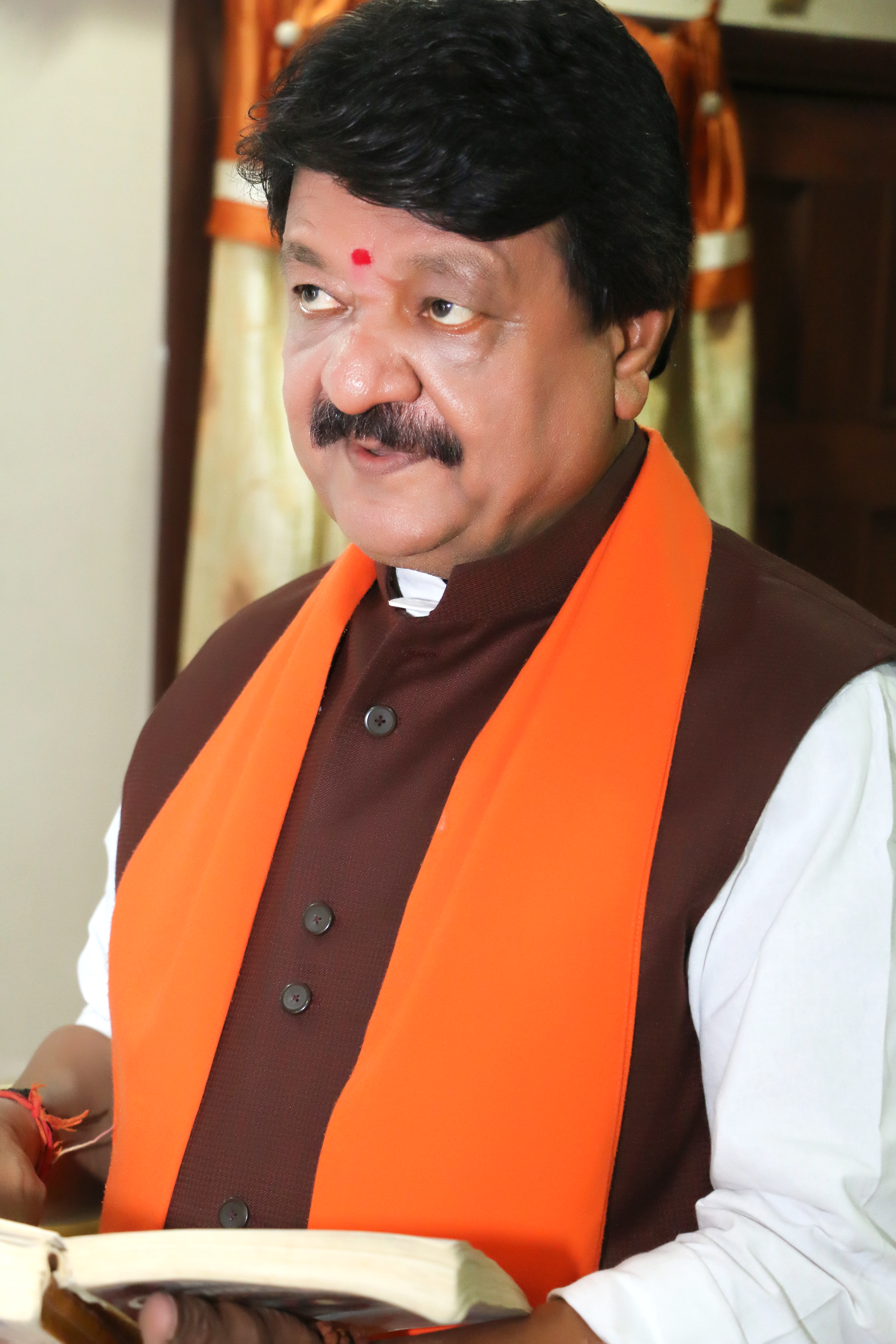
- Vijayvargiya in 2016

Cabinet Minister Madhya Pradesh Government
- Incumbent
- Assumed office 25 December 2023
- Chief Minister: Mohan Yadav
- Ministry and Departments: Urban Development & Housing; Parliamentary Affairs
- Preceded by: O. P. S. Bhadoria
- In office December 2004 – 2018
- Chief Minister: Babulal Gaur; Shivraj Singh Chouhan

Member of the Madhya Pradesh Legislative Assembly
- Incumbent
- Assumed office 25 December 2023
- Preceded by: Sanjay Shukla
- Constituency: Indore-1
- In office 2008–2018
- Preceded by: Antar Singh Darbar
- Succeeded by: Usha Thakur
- Constituency: Mhow
- In office 1993–2008
- Preceded by: Suresh Seth
- Succeeded by: Ramesh Mendola
- Constituency: Indore-2
- In office 1990–1993
- Preceded by: Nandlal Mata
- Succeeded by: Laxman Singh Gaur
- Constituency: Indore-4

National General Secretary Bharatiya Janata Party
- In office 2015–2023
- President: Amit Shah; J. P. Nadda

Mayor of Indore
- In office 2000–2005
- Preceded by: Madhukar Verma
- Succeeded by: Dr. Umashashi Sharma

Corporator Indore Municipal Corporation
- In office 1983–1988

Personal details
- Born: 13 May 1956 (age 70) Indore, Madhya Bharat, India (now in Madhya Pradesh, India)
- Party: Bharatiya Janata Party
- Spouse: Asha Vijayvargiya
- Children: 2 (including Akash Vijayvargiya)
- Education: Devi Ahilya Vishwavidyalaya, Indore
- Website: Official website

Kailash Vijayvargiya (born 13 May 1956) is an Indian politician serving as a Cabinet Minister in the Government of Madhya Pradesh. A member of the Bharatiya Janata Party (BJP), he started his political career in the city of Indore, and was the mayor of Indore, a six-time legislator and a state government cabinet minister for over 12 years before being elevated to the party's central leadership.

Vijayvargiya was made in charge of BJP's election campaign for Haryana in 2014, after which BJP gained a majority in the assembly election. This victory allowed him to gain a more central role in party leadership, and in June 2015, he was appointed national general secretary by party president Amit Shah, and the new leader of the BJP in West Bengal.

== Personal life ==
Kailash Vijayvargiya was born on 13 May 1956 to Shankardayal Vijayvargiya in Indore. He graduated with a Bachelor of Science degree and later earned an LLB. Vijayvargiya is married to Asha Vijayvargiya, with whom he has two sons, including politician Akash Vijayvargiya. He built world's highest Octa metal statue of Hanuman in Indore.

== Political career ==
Kailash Vijayvargiya entered politics through Akhil Bharatiya Vidyarthi Parishad (ABVP) in 1975. He became a corporator of the Indore Municipal Corporation in 1983 and a member of the standing committee in 1985. He has been the state secretary of the Bharatiya Janata Yuva Morcha (BJYM), the BJP, and Indore, and the co-ordinator of State BJP legal cell. He became the state co-ordinator of Vidyarthi Parishad in 1985, state vice-president of the BJYM in 1992, and the national general secretary of the BJYM and the leader of Gujarat in 1993. Vijayvargiya was elected to the Vidhan Sabha in 1990, 1993, 1998, 2003, 2008, and 2013.

He was in charge of the BJP's Haryana state assembly election campaign in 2014, when the party registered its first win in the Haryana state assembly election, taking BJP's tally from 4 to 47 seats. He was named the National General Secretary of the Bharatiya Janata Party as well as the party leader for West Bengal in 2015. He was included in the top 100 influential person list of India for year 2021. He was considered as a game changer for BJP in West Bengal as party won 18 seats in 2019 Lok sabha election.

=== Mayor of Indore ===
Kailash Vijayvargiya became the first directly elected mayor of Indore Municipal Corporation in 2000. He was nominated president of the South Asia Mayors’ Council in 2003, and led the Indian Voluntary Organisation’s team at the World Earth Summit in Durban.

He served as the Mayor of Indore after being elected in the year 2000. He assumed office at the age of 44, making him one of the youngest individuals to have held the mayoral position in the city during the era of directly elected mayors.

In comparison, an earlier political figure from Indore, Narayan Prasad Shukla, became Mayor of Indore at the age of 27, a record that places him among the youngest mayors in the city’s political history.

=== State cabinet minister ===
Kailash Vijayvargiya was sworn in as cabinet minister in Madhya Pradesh Government on 8 December 2008, and given portfolios of Public Works, Parliamentary Affairs, Urban Administration and Development. He was given a portfolio of Religious Trusts, Endowment, and Rehabilitation on 1 July 2004. Vijayvargiya again joined Babulal Gaur's Council of Ministers as Public Works Minister on 27 August 2004. He was re-inducted into Shivraj Singh Chouhan's Council of Ministers on 4 December 2005, as a Public Works, Information Technology, and Science & Technology Minister.

In the second cabinet under Shivraj Singh Chouhan (post-2008 elections), Vijayvargiya held portfolios of IT and Industries. In the third cabinet (post-2013 elections), Vijayvargiya held the portfolio of Urban Development. He brought TCS, Infosys and more than 17 IT companies to Indore. Global investor Meet in MP was one of the biggest initiatives during his tenure as an Industry Minister. Involved in finalizing 259 MOUs for setting up projects worth Rs 4.31 billion.

== Controversies ==
=== Indore water contamination incident ===
Between December 2025 and January 2026, at least 18 people died and over 2,000 residents fell ill after consuming contaminated drinking water in the Bhagirathpura area of Indore. The contamination was caused by a leak in the main pipeline near a public toilet, which led to sewage mixing with the water supply. Despite multiple complaints from residents in the weeks leading up to the incident, there was no remedial action taken by the administration.

During an interaction with NDTV journalist Anurag Dwary, Vijayvargia was questioned regarding accountability and the growing public health concerns. In respone, Vijayvargia dismissed the questions as "useless" and used a derogatory term "ghanta" while responding to Dwary. A video of the exchange was initially broadcast by NDTV and quickly went viral online. However, when the channel later removed the video from its platforms, it was criticised for failing to stand by its reporter due to the channel's perceived closeness to the Bharatiya Janata Party. The incident renewed debate about media independence and the treatment of journalists who question those in power. Vijayvargia later issued a public apology for his remarks.

Vijayvargia was involved in further controversy after the suspension of Anand Malviya, the sub-divisional magistrate of Dewas, who had cited Vijayvargia's statement verbatim – including the derogatory term "ghanta" – and described Vijayvargia's remarks as "inhuman and authoritarian" in his official report. Malviya's suspension was viewed by many as retaliation for portraying Vijayvargia and the government in embarrassing light.

== See also ==
- List of people from Madhya Pradesh
- Category:Bharatiya Janata Party politicians
