= Sumitra Mahajan =

16th Speaker of the Lok Sabha from 2014 to 2019

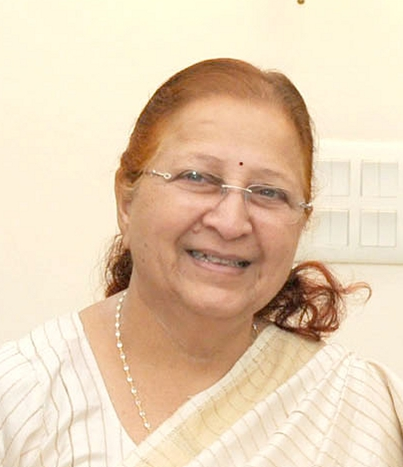
- Mahajan in 2019

16th Speaker of the Lok Sabha
- In office 6 June 2014 – 17 June 2019
- President: Pranab Mukherjee; Ram Nath Kovind
- Deputy: M. Thambidurai
- Leader of the House: Narendra Modi
- Preceded by: Meira Kumar
- Succeeded by: Om Birla

Union Minister of State
- In office October 1999 – May 2004
- Prime Minister: Atal Bihari Vajpayee
- Ministry: Term
- Petroleum and Natural Gas: 24 May 2003 - 22 May 2004
- Communications and Information Technology: 1 July 2002 - 24 May 2003
- Human Resource Development: 13 October 1999 - 1 July 2002

Member of Parliament, Lok Sabha
- In office 18 December 1989 – 24 May 2019
- Preceded by: Prakash Chandra Sethi
- Succeeded by: Shankar Lalwani
- Constituency: Indore, Madhya Pradesh

Deputy Mayor of Indore Municipal Corporation
- In office 1984–1985

Personal details
- Born: Sumitra Sathe; 12 April 1943 (age 83) Chiplun, Bombay Presidency, British India (present-day Maharashtra, India)
- Party: Bharatiya Janata Party
- Other political affiliations: National Democratic Alliance
- Spouse: Jayant Mahajan (m. 1965)
- Children: 2
- Education: Devi Ahilya Vishwavidyalaya
- Awards: Padma Bhushan (2021)
- Nickname: Tai
- Political offices: 1992–1994 : Vice President, Bharatiya Janata Party, Madhya Pradesh; 1995-1996 : Secretary, Bharatiya Janata Party, Parliamentary Board and Chairman, Parliamentary Board, Madhya Pradesh; 1996-1998 : Secretary, Bhartiya Janta Party; 1998-1999 : General Secretary, Bharatiya Janata Party

Sumitra "Tai" Mahajan (née Sathe; born 12 April 1943; Hindi pronunciation: [sʊmɪt̪ɾaː məɦaːd͡ʒən̪]) is an Indian politician who was the 16th Speaker of the Lok Sabha, the lower house of the Indian Parliament, from 2014 to 2019. She belongs to the Bharatiya Janata Party. She represented the Indore constituency of Madhya Pradesh from 1989 to 2019 as the longest serving Woman Member of Parliament.

She also served as a Union Minister of State from 1999 to 2004, holding the portfolios of Human Resource Development, Communications and Information Technology and Petroleum and Natural Gas. She also held position of Chairperson of Standing Committee on Social Justice and Empowerment (2004-2009) and Standing Committee on Rural Development (2009-2014). She was the eldest and seniormost among woman Members of Parliament in the 16th Lok Sabha. She is the second woman after Meira Kumar to be elected as the Speaker of the Lok Sabha. She was awarded India's third highest civilian award, the Padma Bhushan, in 2021.

== Early life and education ==
Sumitra Mahajan was born in a Chitpavan Brahmin Marathi family to Usha and Purushottam Sathe in Chiplun, Maharashtra. Her primary & secondary education took place at United English School, Chiplun. She received her MA and LLB from Indore University (now Devi Ahilya Vishwavidyalaya) after marrying Jayant Mahajan of Indore. Sumitra Mahajan's hobbies include reading, music, drama and cinema as well as an enthusiasm for singing. She has acknowledged the 18th century queen Ahilyabai Holkar as the inspirational figure throughout her life and has written a book on Ahilyabai Holkar's life journey 'Matoshree' which was unveiled by Prime Minister Narendra Modi in 2017.

== Political career ==
Sumitra Mahajan started her political career as a corporator in the Indore Municipal Corporation in 1982. She was later elected as Deputy Mayor of Indore Municipal Corporation in 1984. She ran for the first time and won the Lok Sabha elections in 1989, against former Chief Minister and senior Congress leader Prakash Chandra Sethi. She is popularly known as Tai, among people of her constituency.

== Speaker of the Lok Sabha ==
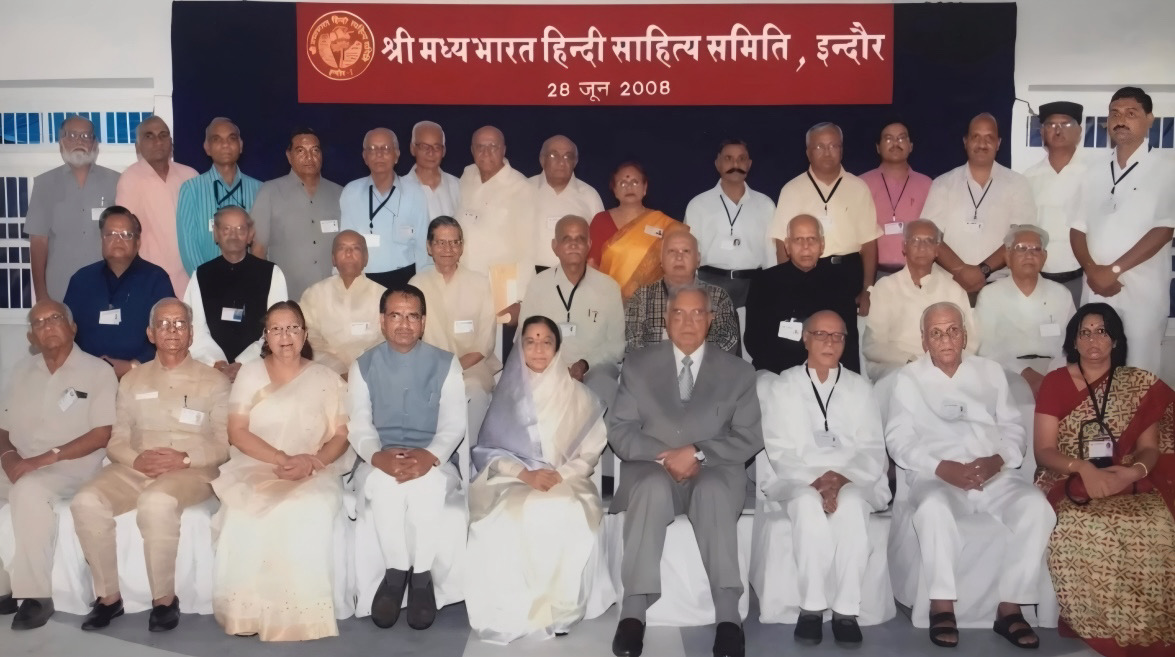
Pratibha Patil, then President of India; Balram Jakhar, then Governor; Shivraj Singh Chouhan, then Chief Minister of Madhya Pradesh; Narayan Prasad Shukla; and Sumitra Mahajan at the centenary (100th anniversary) celebrations of the Shri Madhyabharat Hindi Sahitya Samiti.

On 6 June 2014, Mahajan was unanimously elected as the Speaker of the 16th Lok Sabha. She had earlier worked as a member of the 'Panel of Chairmen' in the Lok Sabha. She took the step of suspending 25 Congress MPs for five days (August 2015) from House for indiscipline in the House.

- Key Patron at NLC Bharat

== Controversy ==
Former chairperson of Indore-based Maharashtra Brahmin Cooperative Bank Anil Kumar Dhadwaiwale alleged Sumitra Mahajan and her son Milind Mahajan's roles were crucial in the scams that took place in the bank between 1997 and 2003. Sumitra Mahajan was a minister in the Central Government during this period.

Milind Mahajan was one of the directors of the bank when the alleged scam took place. In 2005, an FIR in the scam was lodged at Central Kotwali Police Station, Indore against 16 persons including Milind Mahajan, but it was removed after the investigation. Many directors including Sumitra Mahajan's Private Secretary's husband, also obtained the loan but did not pay.

Lok Sabha
Preceded by Prakash Chandra Sethi	Member of Parliament for Indore; 1989 – 2019	Succeeded by Shankar Lalwani
Political offices
Preceded by Meira Kumar	Speaker of the Lok Sabha; 2014 – 2019	Succeeded by Om Birla
