= Indore-2 Assembly constituency =

Constituency of Madhya Pradesh legislative assembly in India

Coordinates: 22.72°N 75.86°E

Indore-2
- Constituency No. 205 for the Madhya Pradesh Legislative Assembly

Constituency details
- Country: India
- Region: Central India
- State: Madhya Pradesh
- District: Indore
- Lok Sabha constituency: Indore
- Established: 1967
- Reservation: None

Member of Legislative Assembly
- 16th Madhya Pradesh Legislative Assembly
- Incumbent Ramesh Mendola
- Party: Bharatiya Janta Party
- Elected year: 2023
- Preceded by: Kailash Vijayvargiya

Indore-2 Assembly constituency is one of the 230 Vidhan Sabha (Legislative Assembly) constituencies of Madhya Pradesh state in central India.

== Overview ==
Indore-2 Assembly constituency is one of the 8 Vidhan Sabha constituencies located in Indore district which comes under Indore (Lok Sabha constituency). Constituency includes Ward Nos from ward no 18 to ward no 34 of Indore city.

== Members of Legislative Assembly ==
Year	Member	Party
1967	Gangaram Tiwari	Indian National Congress
1972	Homi F. Daji	Communist Party of India
1977	Yagyadatt Sharma	Indian National Congress
1980	Kanhaiyalal Yadav	Indian National Congress (I)
1985	Kanhaiyalal Yadav	Indian National Congress
1990	Suresh Seth	Indian National Congress
1993	Kailash Vijayvargiya	Bharatiya Janata Party
1998	Kailash Vijayvargiya	Bharatiya Janata Party
2003	Kailash Vijayvargiya	Bharatiya Janata Party
2008	Ramesh Mendola	Bharatiya Janata Party
2013	Ramesh Mendola	Bharatiya Janata Party
2018	Ramesh Mendola	Bharatiya Janata Party
2023	Ramesh Mendola	Bharatiya Janata Party

== Election results ==
=== 2023 ===
2023 Madhya Pradesh Legislative Assembly election: Indore-2
Party	Candidate	Votes	%	±%
BJP	Ramesh Mendola	169,071	71.58	+7.64
INC	Chintu Choukse	62,024	26.26	−4.97
NOTA	None of the above	2,142	0.91	−0.45
Majority		107,047	45.32	+12.61
Turnout		236,200	67.94	+3.19
BJP hold		Swing		

=== 2018 ===
2018 Madhya Pradesh Legislative Assembly election: Indore-2
Party	Candidate	Votes	%	±%
BJP	Ramesh Mendola	138,794	63.94	
INC	Mohan Singh Sengar	67,783	31.23	
NOTA	None of the above	2,951	1.36	
Majority		71,011	32.71	
Turnout		217,068	64.75	
BJP hold		Swing		

=== 2013 ===
M. P. Legislative Assembly Election, 2013: Indore-2
Party	Candidate	Votes	%	±%
BJP	Ramesh Mendola	133,669	71.60	
INC	Chhotu Shukla	42,652	22.85	
BSP	Rajendra Choudhary	2,378	1.27	
CPI	Rudrapal Yadav	1,151	0.62	
NCP	Prince Yohan	656	0.35	
NOTA	None of the Above	4,919	2.63	
Majority		91,017	48.75	
Turnout		1,86,690	65.55	
BJP hold		Swing		

=== 1998 ===
1998 Madhya Pradesh Legislative Assembly election: Indore-2
Party	Candidate	Votes	%	±%
BJP	Kailash Vijayvargiya	64,409	58.74	
INC	Dr. Rekha Gandhi	44,136	40.25	
SAP	Dadabhai Potdhan	330	0.30	
RPI	Rajana Nigam	211	0.19	
SP	Narayan Tripathi	204	0.19	
Majority		20,273	18.49	
Turnout		109,654	52.78	
BJP hold		Swing		

== See also ==
- Indore
- Indore (Lok Sabha constituency)
