= Satyanarayan Patel =

Indian politician

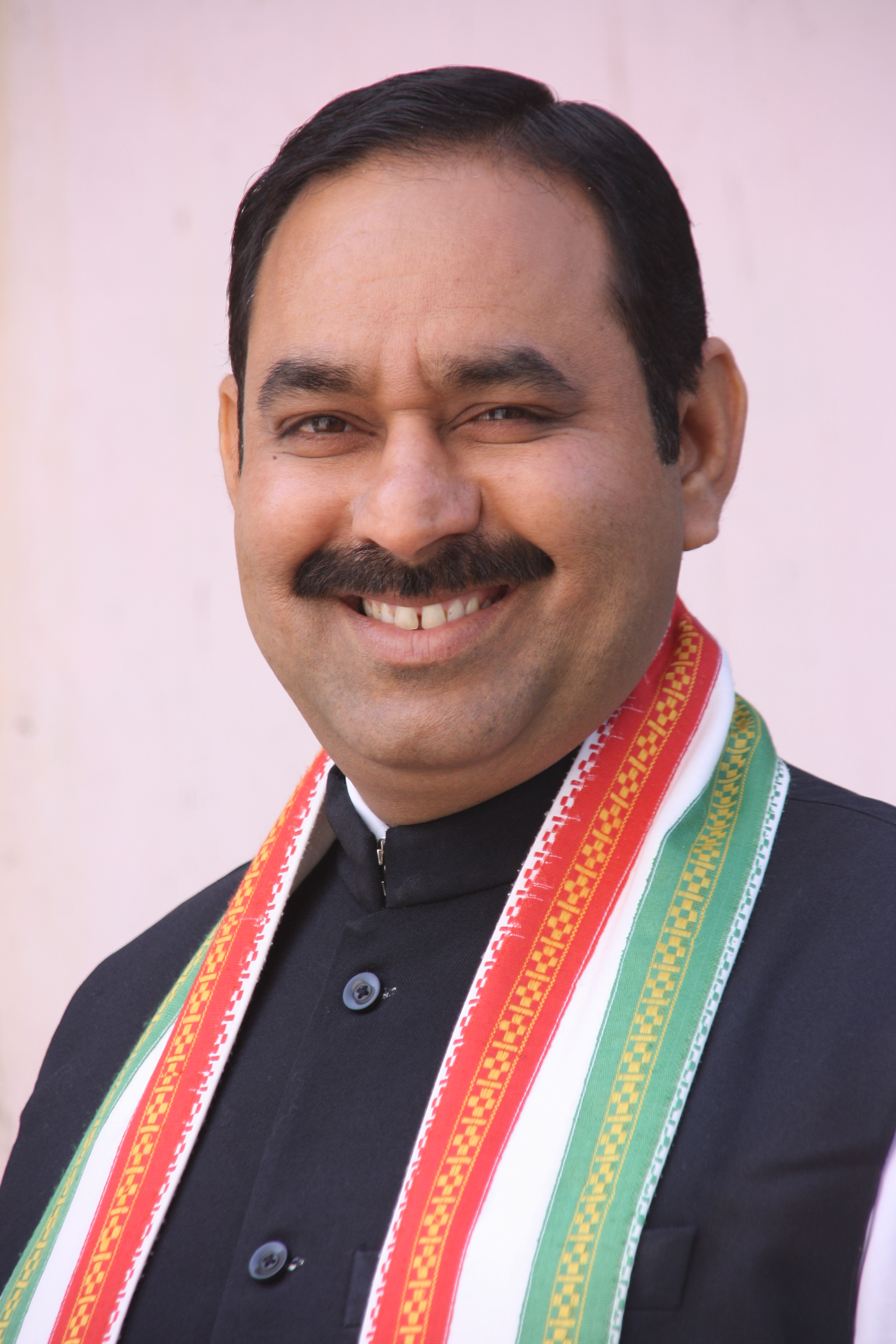

Member of Legislative Assembly from Madhya Pradesh
- In office 1998–2003
- Preceded by: Bhanwar Singh Shekhawat
- Succeeded by: Mahendra Hardia
- Constituency: Indore-5
- In office 2008–2013
- Succeeded by: Manoj Patel
- Constituency: Depalpur

Personal details
- Born: 25 July 1967 (age 59)
- Party: Indian National Congress
- Spouse: Anita Patel
- Children: 1 Son
- Parent: Rameshwar Patel (father)
- Education: Bachelor of Commerce
- Profession: Politician
- Website: Satyanarayanpatel.org
- As of 27 July, 2018 Source: ["Biography:Patel, Satyanarayan" (PDF). Madhya Pradesh Legislative Assembly.]

Satyanarayan Patel is an Indian politician and national secretary of the Indian National Congress party, incharge of Uttar Pradesh.

== Political career ==
In February 2014, Satyanarayan Patel won the internal party election process also known as primaries to select the Congress candidate for the Indore Lok Sabha constituency. He was the first candidate to win such election. However, he later lost the Lok Sabha election to BJP candidate Sumitra Mahajan.

He has shouldered various responsibilities within party and in government:

Year	Position
2018	Ex. Member of Legislative Assembly (Indore Constituency 5)
2013–2018	Ex. Member of Legislative Assembly (Depalpur)
2008–2013	Member of Legislative Assembly (Depalpur)
1998–2003	Member of Legislative Assembly (Indore Constituency 5)
1997–1998	National President, Association of District Panchayat
1994–1997	President, Indore District Panchayat
1995–1996	President, Madhya Pradesh Congress Panchayat Cell
1991–1993	General Secretary, Madhya Pradesh Youth Congress
1990–1991	General Secretary, Indore Youth Congress
1989	Elected Deputy Sarpanch, Gram Panchayat, Indore

== Fake allegation ==
In October 2013, just before assembly election in Madhya Pradesh, a sleaze CD surfaced featuring Satyanarayan Patel. However, the matter was immediately reported to the concerned authorities and the authenticity of the video was investigated by forensic lab in New Delhi. The report stated that the video was fake. Subsequently, three people were arrested by the police under cyber law for morphing.

== See also ==
- Madhya Pradesh Legislative Assembly
- 2008 Madhya Pradesh Legislative Assembly election
- 1998 Madhya Pradesh Legislative Assembly election
