= Malini Gaur =

Indian politician

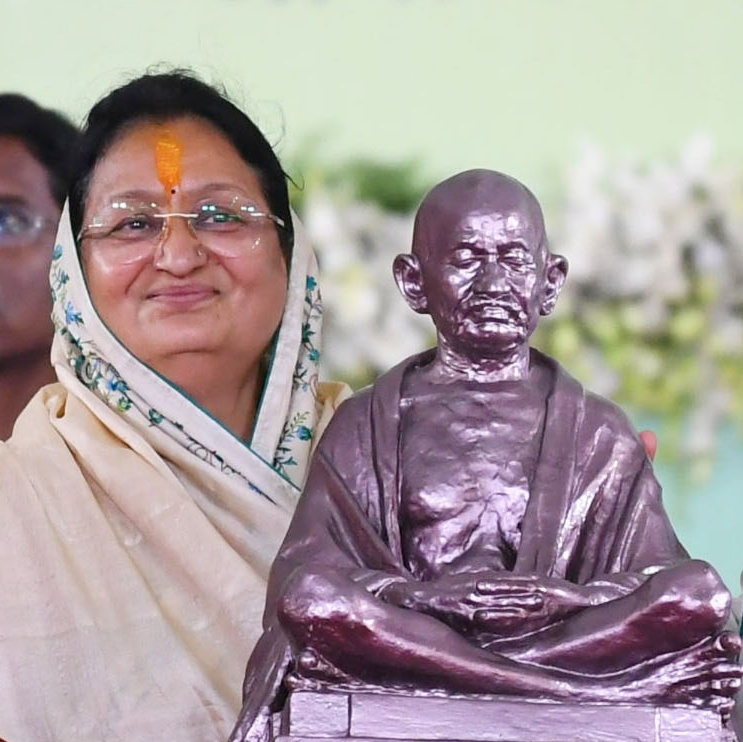

Member of the Madhya Pradesh Legislative Assembly
- Incumbent
- Assumed office December 2008
- Preceded by: Laxman Singh Gaur
- Constituency: Indore-4

Mayor of Indore
- In office February 2015 – 2020
- Preceded by: Krishna Murari Moghe
- Succeeded by: Pushyamitra Bhargav

Personal details
- Born: Jhabua, Madhya Pradesh, India
- Party: Bharatiya Janata Party
- Spouse: Laxman Singh Gaur (m. 1983–2008)
- Education: Devi Ahilya Vishwavidyalaya
- Profession: Politician

Malini Laxmansingh Gaur is an Indian politician serving as the mayor of Indore. She is a member of the Bharatiya Janata Party. She became mayor in February 2015 by defeating her nearest rival Archana Jaiswal of Indian National Congress by 2.8 lakh votes. Consequently, she became only the second woman to do so after Umashashi Sharma. Her husband Laxman Singh Gaur, was the former higher education minister of Madhya Pradesh who died in a car accident near Dewas in February 2008.

| Preceded by Krishna Murari Moghe | Mayor of Indore; 2015 - present | Succeeded by Incumbent |
| Preceded by Laxman Singh Gaud | Member of legislative assembly from Indore; 2008- present | Succeeded by Incumbent |
