= Kalyan Jain =

Indian politician (1934–2023)

Kalyan Jain (13 August 1934 – 13 July 2023) was an Indian politician who was a member of the 6th Lok Sabha. He represented the Indore constituency of Madhya Pradesh and is a member of the Janata Party. He was also member of Samyukta Socialist Party, Socialist Party and Bharatiya Lok Dal.

Jain was born in Indore, Madhya Pradesh on 13 August 1934, and died on 13 July 2023, at the age of 88.
