= Ramesh Mendola =

Indian politician

Member of the Madhya Pradesh Legislative Assembly
- Incumbent
- Assumed office 2008
- Preceded by: Kailash Vijayvargiya
- Constituency: Indore-2

President of Madhya Pradesh Olympic Association
- Incumbent
- Assumed office 2017

Personal details
- Born: 13 November 1960 Nandanagar, Indore, Madhya Pradesh
- Party: Bharatiya Janata Party
- Profession: Politician

Ramesh Mendola is an Indian politician of BJP from Indore who has been a member of Madhya Pradesh Legislative Assembly from Indore-2 (Vidhan Sabha constituency) since 2008. In the previous election held in 2013 he won from this constituency by a record margin of over 91000 votes. Repeating his performance in 2018 Madhya Pradesh Legislative Assembly election, Mendola again won from this seat by a record margin of over 71000 votes retaining the title of largest victory margin winner of the newly elected assembly. He is the President of Madhya Pradesh Olympic Association.

== Political career ==
Ramesh Mendola is considered to be a close associate of national General Secretary of the Bharatiya Janata Party Kailash Vijayvargiya, who is also from Indore and originally represented Indore-2 constituency until handing it over to Mendola in 2008.

Before fighting assembly election, Mendola has been previously elected as a corporator in Indore Municipal Corporation several times. He has also served as the city President of Indore BJP. He has also served as the president of Nanda Nagar Sakh Sahkari Sanstha Maryadit, a local credit cooperative society in Indore-2, his constituency. Ramesh Mendola was elected to the Vidhan Sabha in 2008, 2013, 2018 and 2023

== Controversies ==
Ramesh Mendola was accused of corruption in Sugni Devi land Scam, A case of misappropriation of funds in a school land in Nandanagar, located in his constituency- Indore-2. The case was closely followed in political circles following the legislator's proximity to BJP general secretary Kailash Vijayvargiya. Later, charges against Ramesh Mendola were dropped by high court in this case."
