= Dwarka Prasad Mishra =

Indian politician, writer and journalist (1901–1988)

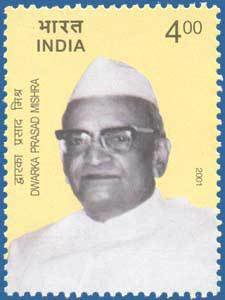

4th Chief Minister of Madhya Pradesh
- In office 30 September 1963 – 29 July 1967
- Preceded by: Bhagwantrao Mandloi
- Succeeded by: Govind Narayan Singh

Personal details
- Born: 5 August 1901 Padari, North-Western Provinces, British India (now in Uttar Pradesh, India)
- Died: 31 May 1988 (aged 86)
- Relatives: Brajesh Mishra (Son) Sudhir Mishra (Grandson)
- Occupation: Politician
- Known for: Chief Minister of Madhya Pradesh

Dwarka Prasad Mishra (5 August 1901 – 31 May 1988) was an Indian politician, writer and journalist. He was a member of the Indian National Congress and served as the Chief Minister of Madhya Pradesh for two terms during the 1960s.

An Indian freedom fighter and diplomat, he was from a Kanyakubja Brahmin family of Padari a village in Unnao. As a poet he composed the mahakavya, Krishnayana (transl. Journey of Krishna). He became the Chief Minister of Madhya Pradesh after Ravi Shankar Shukla.

== Early life and freedom movement ==
Mishra was born on 5 August 1901 in Padari village in Unnao district (present-day Uttar Pradesh). He became politically active at a young age and participated in the Non-Cooperation Movement and later in the Quit India Movement. He was imprisoned during the Indian freedom struggle.

== Political career ==
=== Role in Congress politics ===
Dwarka Prasad Mishra emerged as an influential leader of the Indian National Congress in the Central Provinces and later in Madhya Pradesh following the reorganisation of states in 1956. He was active in national-level party deliberations during the Nehru era and maintained working relationships with senior leaders including Jawaharlal Nehru, Indira Gandhi, and Morarji Desai.

Political commentaries frequently describe Mishra as a strategist within the Congress organization during the turbulent period following the 1967 general elections, when Congress dominance weakened in several states. Following the 1967 elections, Mishra, along with Chandra Bhanu Gupta, was involved in intra-party negotiations that led to a power-sharing understanding between Indira Gandhi and Morarji Desai, under which Desai assumed the office of Deputy Prime Minister. The arrangement subsequently collapsed and contributed to the 1969 split in the Congress party.

Mishra's political memoirs later revealed correspondence attributed to Sardar Vallabhbhai Patel concerning internal Congress matters in 1946. The publication of this material generated public and political debate, with some Congress leaders questioning the authenticity and timing of its disclosure. The episode drew renewed attention to Mishra's proximity to senior Congress leadership during the formative years of independent India.

Some political narratives and retrospective accounts have suggested that Mishra maintained channels of dialogue across ideological lines during the early decades of independence, including engagement with leaders associated with the Rashtriya Swayamsevak Sangh. However, his primary political affiliation throughout his career remained with the Congress party.

== Chief Minister of Madhya Pradesh ==
Dwarka Prasad Mishra served two consecutive terms as Chief Minister of Madhya Pradesh from 30 September 1963 to 8 March 1967 and from 9 March 1967 to 29 July 1967. His tenure coincided with a politically transitional period marked by internal factionalism within the Indian National Congress and shifting electoral dynamics following the 1967 general elections.

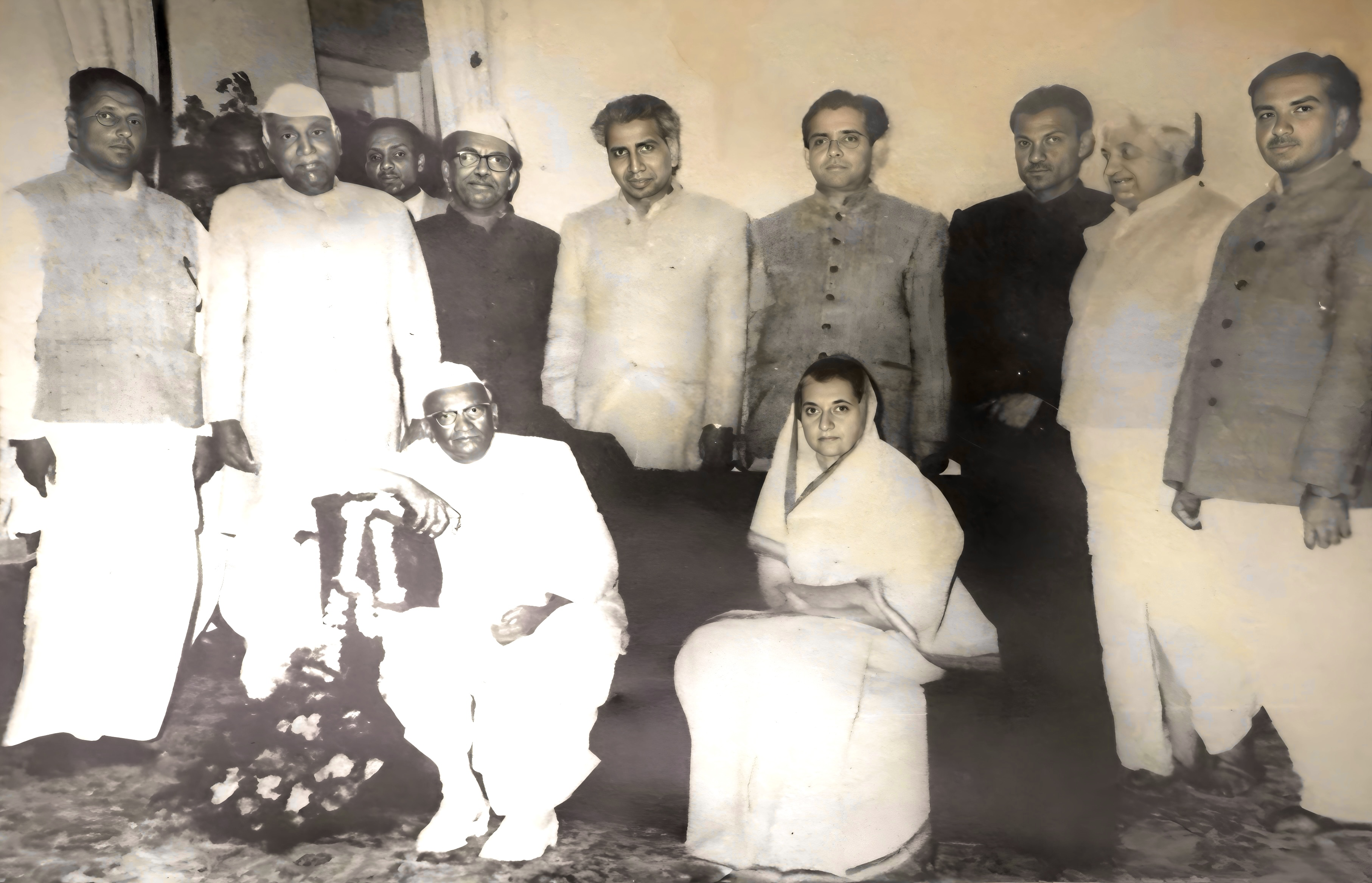
Indira Gandhi, then Prime Minister of India; Dwarka Prasad Mishra, former Chief Minister of Madhya Pradesh; and Prakash Chandra Sethi at the residence of Narayan Prasad Shukla.

During his administration, Mishra was regarded as an assertive organizational leader within the state Congress. Contemporary political accounts describe him as playing a significant role in consolidating party structures in Madhya Pradesh after the reorganisation of states, and in navigating the emerging challenges posed by opposition mobilization during the mid-1960s.

At the national level, Mishra, along with Chandra Bhanu Gupta, was instrumental in facilitating negotiations within the Congress party following the 1967 elections, which resulted in a power-sharing understanding between Indira Gandhi and Morarji Desai. Under this arrangement, Desai assumed the office of Deputy Prime Minister. The arrangement later deteriorated and contributed to the 1969 split in the Congress party.

Political retrospectives frequently characterize Mishra as a strategist during this phase of Congress politics, particularly in relation to intra-party negotiations and leadership alignments in the late 1960s. His chief ministership is often viewed within the broader context of a shifting national political landscape that preceded the fragmentation of Congress dominance in several states.

== Political associations and family ==
Dwarka Prasad Mishra's son, Brajesh Mishra, later became a prominent diplomat and strategic policymaker. A member of the Indian Foreign Service, he served as Principal Secretary to Prime Minister Atal Bihari Vajpayee and concurrently as National Security Adviser from 1998 to 2004. While Dwarka Prasad Mishra's political career was rooted in the Congress tradition and closely associated with the Indira Gandhi era, Brajesh Mishra played a central role in governance during the Vajpayee-led National Democratic Alliance government, reflecting a continuity of public service across differing political contexts in independent India.

Dwarka Prasad Mishra maintained long-standing political associations within the Madhya Pradesh unit of the Indian National Congress, among whom Narayan Prasad Shukla occupied a prominent position. Shukla, who later served as Mayor of Indore and held ministerial office, was active in state Congress politics both during and beyond Mishra's tenure as Chief Minister. Contemporary accounts of the period place Shukla within Mishra's close political circle, noting their sustained coordination in party organization and state governance. Political narratives frequently describe Shukla as one of the leaders who enjoyed Mishra's enduring confidence and guidance, reflecting a relationship that extended beyond formal office and continued across different phases of state politics.

Mishra's family included his grandson, Sudhir Mishra, who later became an Indian film director and screenwriter known for his contributions to Hindi cinema.

== Legacy and influence ==
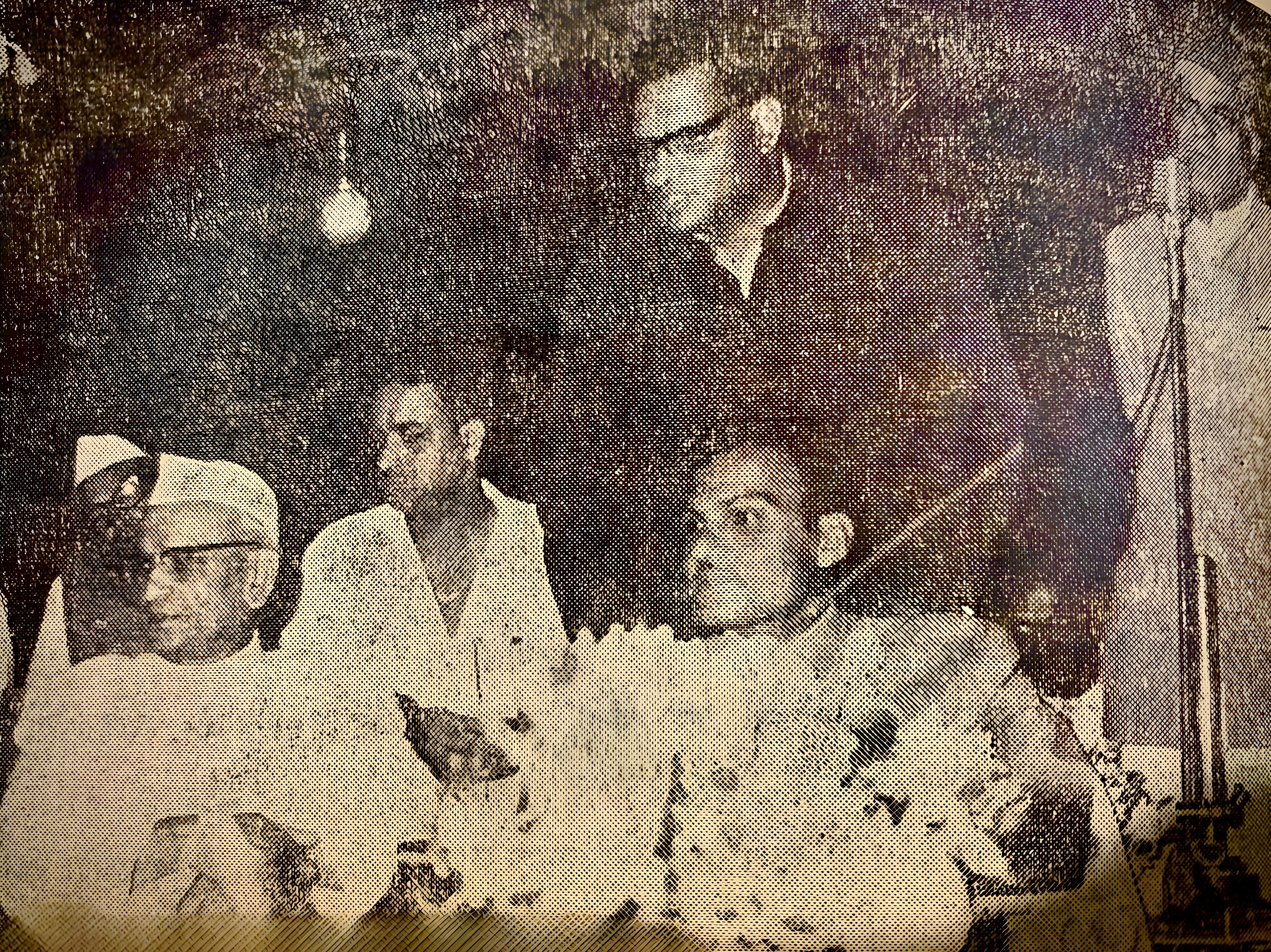
Chief Minister Dwarka Prasad Mishra (left) with Narayan Prasad Shukla, Mayor of Indore, during a public function in Madhya Pradesh, c. 1960s.

Dwarka Prasad Mishra is remembered in Madhya Pradesh political history as a strategist and organizational leader within the Indian National Congress. Political accounts of the period describe him as an influential figure during a transitional phase in state and national politics, particularly in the years surrounding the 1967 elections and subsequent intra-party developments.

Beyond his tenure as Chief Minister (1963–1967), his influence continued within party structures in Madhya Pradesh. Leaders associated with him, including Narayan Prasad Shukla, remained active in public life and are often regarded in political narratives as part of the broader circle shaped by Mishra's leadership within the state Congress.

At the national level, Mishra's memoirs — Living an Era: India's March to Freedom, The Nehru Epoch: From Democracy to Monocracy, and The Post Nehru Era — contributed to contemporary political discourse by offering detailed reflections on the functioning of the Congress party and the evolution of Indian democracy. His political and intellectual legacy is frequently discussed in retrospective accounts of Congress politics during the 1960s and 1970s.

Pandit Dwarka Prasad Mishra Indian Institute of Information Technology, Design and Manufacturing, Jabalpur an institute of national importannce situated in Jabalpur, Madhya Pradesh is named after him.

== Writings ==
His writings include:

- Living an Era: India's March to Freedom (part one of memoirs, covering the period up to 1947)
- The Nehru Epoch: From Democracy to Monocracy (part two of memoirs, critiquing the time from 1947 to 1964)
- The Post Nehru Era: Political Memoirs (third and concluding part of memoirs, showing India in the post Nehru era up till the 1980s)
- The search for Lanka (famous for proposing the thesis that Ramayana's Lanka was in Madhya Pradesh instead of Sri Lanka)
- Krishnayan

His memoirs became controversial as they included a letter from Vallabhbhai Patel to Mishra dated to July 1946 criticising Nehru for "Juvenile Mistakes". Congress members questioned the authenticity of the letter as well as Mishra's motives and timing of revelation.

He was also active in the struggle for Indian independence and went to jail for the cause, for the first time aged 19 in 1920.

== Personal life and death ==
Dwarka Prasad Mishra died on 31 May 1988. Later media reports noted that certain personal wishes expressed by him prior to his death were reportedly not fulfilled at the time of his cremation.
