= Indore-5 Assembly constituency =

Constituency of the Madhya Pradesh legislative assembly in India

Coordinates: 22.751°N 75.877°E

Indore-5
- Constituency No. 208 for the Madhya Pradesh Legislative Assembly

Constituency details
- Country: India
- Region: Central India
- State: Madhya Pradesh
- District: Indore
- Lok Sabha constituency: Indore
- Established: 1977
- Reservation: None

Member of Legislative Assembly
- 16th Madhya Pradesh Legislative Assembly
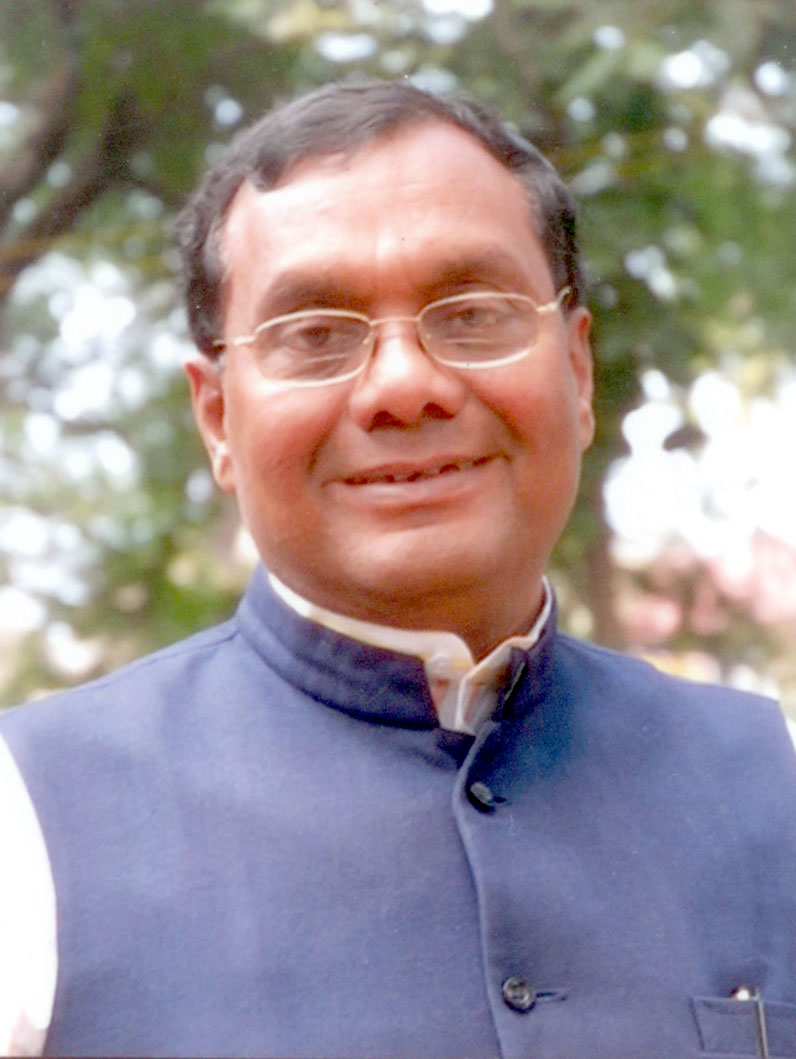
- Incumbent Mahendra Hardia
- Party: Bharatiya Janata Party
- Elected year: 2023
- Preceded by: Satyanarayan Patel

Indore-5 Assembly constituency is one of the 230 Vidhan Sabha (Legislative Assembly) constituencies of Madhya Pradesh state in central India.

== Overview ==
Indore-5 Assembly constituency is one of the 8 Vidhan Sabha constituencies located in Indore district which comes under Indore (Lok Sabha constituency). Constituency includes Ward No.9, 31, 34 to 40 and 62 to 65 of Indore city.

== Members of Legislative Assembly ==
Year	Name	Party
1977	Suresh Seth	Indian National Congress
1980	Suresh Seth	Indian National Congress (Indira)
1985	Suresh Seth	Independent
1990	Ashok Shukla	Indian National Congress
1993	Bhanwar Singh Shekhawat	Bharatiya Janata Party
1998	Satyanarayan Patel	Indian National Congress
2003	Mahendra Hardia	Bharatiya Janata Party
2008	Mahendra Hardia	Bharatiya Janata Party
2013	Mahendra Hardia	Bharatiya Janata Party
2018	Mahendra Hardia	Bharatiya Janata Party
2023	Mahendra Hardia	Bharatiya Janata Party

== Election results ==
=== 2023 ===
2023 Madhya Pradesh Legislative Assembly election: Indore-5
Party	Candidate	Votes	%	±%
BJP	Mahendra Hardia	144,733	51.43	+3.13
INC	Satyanarayan Patel	129,062	45.86	−1.98
NOTA	None of the above	1,549	0.55	−0.59
Majority		15,671	5.57	+5.11
Turnout		281,428	68.3	+2.63
BJP hold		Swing		

=== 2018 ===
2018 Madhya Pradesh Legislative Assembly election: Indore-5
Party	Candidate	Votes	%	±%
BJP	Mahendra Hardia	117,836	48.3	
INC	Satyanarayan Patel	116,704	47.84	
NOTA	None of the above	2,786	1.14	
Majority		1,132	0.46	
Turnout		243,949	65.67	
BJP hold		Swing		

=== 1998 ===
1998 Madhya Pradesh Legislative Assembly election: Indore-5
Party	Candidate	Votes	%	±%
INC	Satyanarayan Patel	74,483	53.40	
BJP	Bhanwar Singh Shekhawat	63,648	45.63	
JD	Ajay Yadav	300	0.22	
SP	Sangramsingh Lakshman Singh	248	0.18	
Independent	Smt. Rekha Solanki	213	0.15	
Majority		10,835	7.77	
Turnout		139,480	53.49	
INC gain from BJP		Swing		

== See also ==
- Indore
- Indore (Lok Sabha constituency)
