= Nirbhay Singh Patel =

Indian politician

Nirbhay Singh Patel was a leader of Bharatiya Janata Party from Madhya Pradesh. He was a member of Madhya Pradesh Legislative Assembly elected from Depalpur in 1980, 1990, 1993. He served as cabinet minister in Patwa ministry. His son Manoj Patel is the currently MLA from the same constituency.
