= Manoj Patel =

Indian politician

Member of the Madhya Pradesh Legislative Assembly
- Incumbent
- Assumed office 2023
- Constituency: Depalpur

Personal details
- Political party: Bharatiya Janata Party
- Parent: Nirbhay Singh Patel (father)
- Profession: Politician

Manoj Nirbhay Singh Patel is an Indian politician from Madhya Pradesh. He is a three time elected member of the Madhya Pradesh Legislative Assembly from 2003, 2013, and 2023, representing Depalpur Assembly constituency as a Member of the Bharatiya Janata Party.

== See also ==
- List of chief ministers of Madhya Pradesh
- Madhya Pradesh Legislative Assembly
