= Mahendra Hardia =

Indian politician

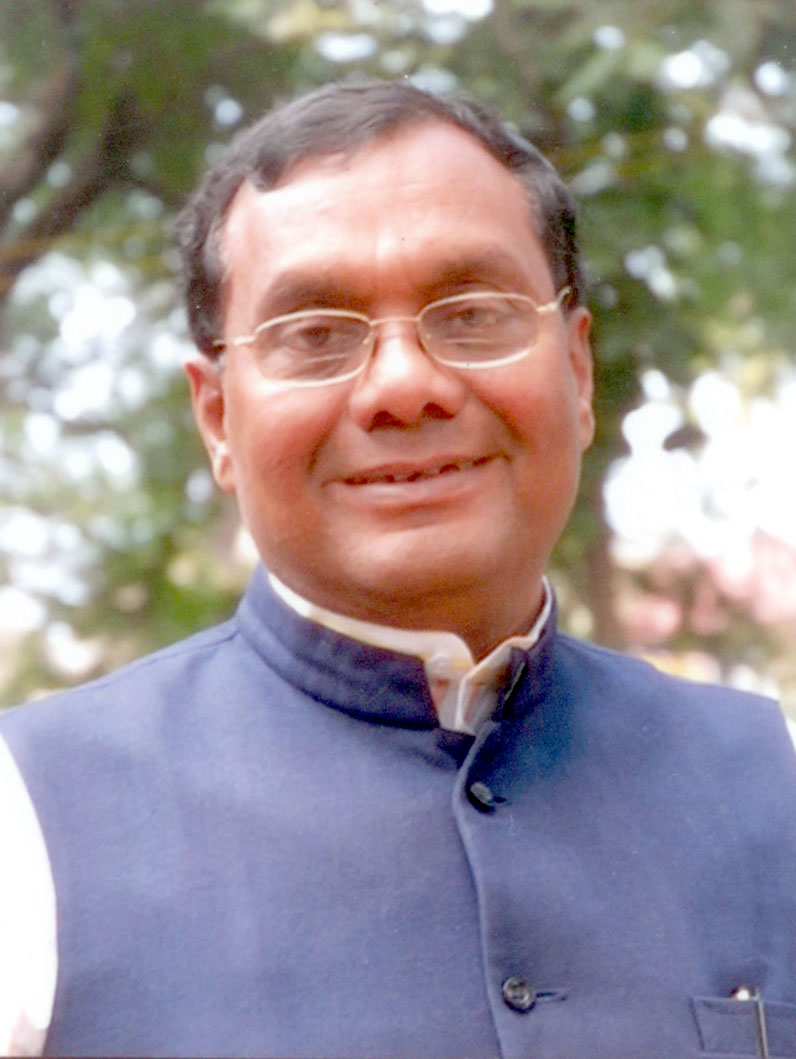
- Hardia in 2008

Member of the Madhya Pradesh Legislative Assembly
- Incumbent
- Assumed office 2003
- Preceded by: Satyanarayan Patel
- Constituency: Indore-5

Personal details
- Born: 22 August 1953 (age 72) Indore, Madhya Bharat, India
- Party: Bharatiya Janata Party
- Spouse: Anita Hardia
- Children: 2
- Education: B.Sc, M. A.
- Alma mater: Indore University

Mahendra Hardia (born August 22, 1953) is the current Member of Legislative Assembly from Indore Constituency 5 of Madhya Pradesh. He is elected from No. 5 constituency of Indore for the record fifth time. His notable works as an ex health minister include the implementation of Janani Suraksha Yojna, a program of Madhya Pradesh government to provide healthcare facilities to pregnant women.

== Early life and education ==
Hardia was born to Keval Chand Hardia, a businessman in Indore. He received his education in Indore at Holkar college and completed his B.Sc. Later he completed his M.A. from Indore University (currently known as Devi Ahilya University).

== Political career ==
Hardia started his career as a youth leader in Indore University. He later joined BJP and was promoted to the post of Health minister in Shivraj Government.

Electoral Performance Hardia has consistently secured victories in the Indore-5 constituency: • 2003: Elected as MLA, defeating Satyanarayan Patel. • 2008: Re-elected, defeating Shobha Oza. • 2013: Won against Pankaj Sanghvi. • 2018: Narrowly defeated Satyanarayan Patel by 1,132 votes . • 2023: Secured victory with 144,733 votes, defeating Satyanarayan Patel by a margin of 15,671 votes .

Preceded by	Health Minister of Madhya Pradesh; 2008 – 2016	Succeeded by Shri Rustam Singh
