= R. C. Jall =

Indian industrialist, lawyer and politician

R.C. Jall

Rustomji Cowasji Jall (1884–1973) was an Indian industrialist, lawyer and politician. He headed various textile mill companies in Indore and Ujjain, and functioned as the representative of the interests of mill owners in state politics in Madhya Bharat and Madhya Pradesh during the 1950s and 1960s. He was the Member of Legislative Assembly of Mhow between 1952 and 1972, belonging to the Indian National Congress.

== Biography ==
Jall was born on November 14, 1884, in Mhow, in a Parsi family. He obtained a B.A. degree from Holkar College in Indore in 1906. He would later obtain M.A. and LL.B. degrees. He took up law practice in Aligarh. He moved back to Mhow. He practiced law in Mhow and Indore.

Jall was appointed Managing Director in-charge at the Kalyanmal Mills Ltd. in Indore. Subsequently Sir Seth Hukumchand named him Managing Director of his company, with oversight of all his mills. Jall would go on to serve as Director, Managing Director or on Board of Directors of most of the textile mill companies in Indore and Ujjain. Jall served on the All-India Textile Control Board during World War II, named to the role by the Government of India He was also present on the Post-war Planning Committee, the All-India Textile Advisory Committee, the Cotton Advisory Board and other official bodies. He was a member of the Madhya Bharat Board of Secondary Education and the Faculty of Commerce of Agra University for a number of years. Jall was a member of the Holkar State Legislative Council, and then a member of the Madhya Bharat Legislative Council.

Jall was an Indian National Congress politician. He was a prominent ally of the Nai Duniya faction in Indore Congress Party politics. He represented the interests of textile mill owners visavi the state governments, and served as the Chairman of the Madhya Bharat Millowners' Association 1950-1954. He would remain on the board of the [Madhya Pradesh] Millowners' Association after the merger of Madhya Bharat into Madhya Pradesh.

He won the Mhow seat in the Legislative Assembly four times. In the 1952 Madhya Bharat Legislative Assembly election he obtained 17,480 votes (69.57%). Jall obtained 14,562 votes (72.21%) in the 1957 Madhya Pradesh Legislative Assembly election, whilst in the 1962 election his vote share had declined to 12,682 votes (54.13%). As of 1960 he sat on the Board of Directors of Kalyanmal Mills Ltd., Rajkumar Mills Ltd. (Indore), the Indore Malwa United Mills Ltd. (Indore), the Binod Mills Company Ltd. (Ujjain) and the Hira Mills Ltd. (Ujjain). He was the owner of the Rajkumar Mills, and the chief manager of the Kalyanmal Mills. In the 1967 Madhya Pradesh Legislative Assembly election his votes in the election for the Mhow seat increased to 18,053 votes (52.04%).

Jall was a known philanthropist. On August 7, 1956 he founded the R.C. Jall Public Charity Trust Jall, through a 1,250,000 Indian rupee donation from his personal fortunes. He also created or built a number of other institutions in Mhow, such as the Mhow Town Hall, the R. C. Jall Law College and a number of village schools. He donated 300,000 rupees for the establishment of a business management training institution and 100,000 rupees to establish a science degree college in Mhow.

Jall died on December 17, 1973.
