= Yagya Datt Sharma (Madhya Pradesh politician) =

Indian politician

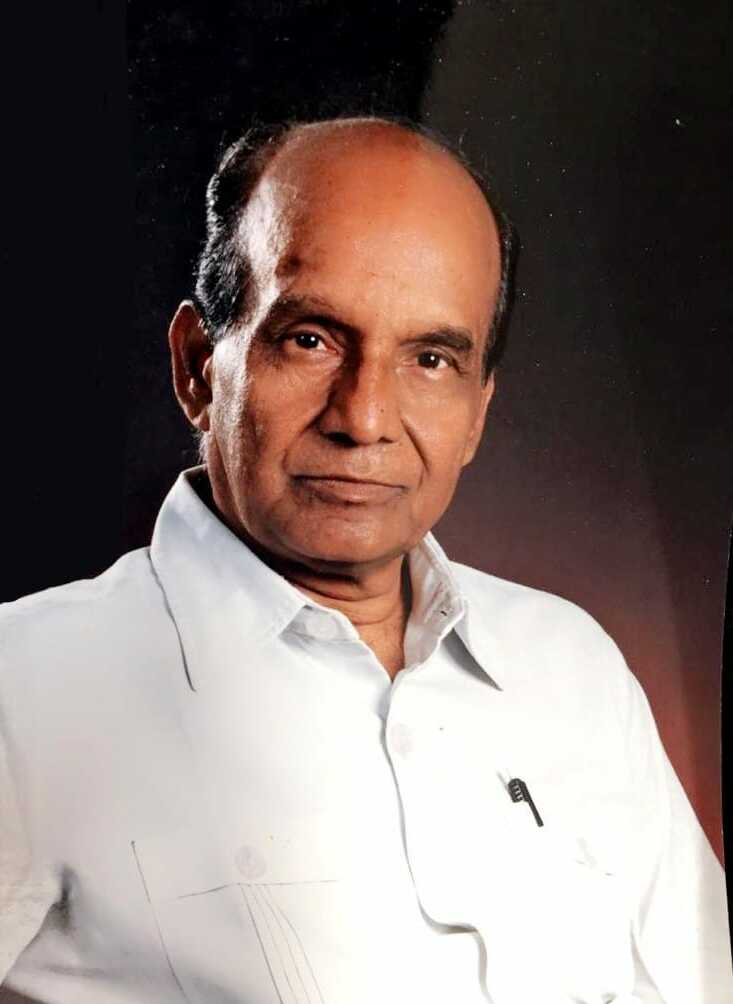
Yagya Dutta Sharma

Yagya Dutta Sharma (Hindi: यज्ञ दत्त शर्मा, 5 April 1936 – 20 May 2016) was an Indian politician from the state of Madhya Pradesh of India. He Started as an Advocate in Indore, Later he represented Indore-4 constituency to the Madhya Pradesh Legislative Assembly for the first time as an independent candidate in 1967, Indore-2 in 1977 from Indian National Congress. He again represented Indore-4 in 1980.

In the early 1980s he became Speaker of the State lower house, and had retired from his speaker-ship and constituency. He retired on 19 July 1983; Arjun Singh was Chief Minister then. People from Indore, Madhya Pradesh have built a monument in his remembering located in Indore his birthplace.

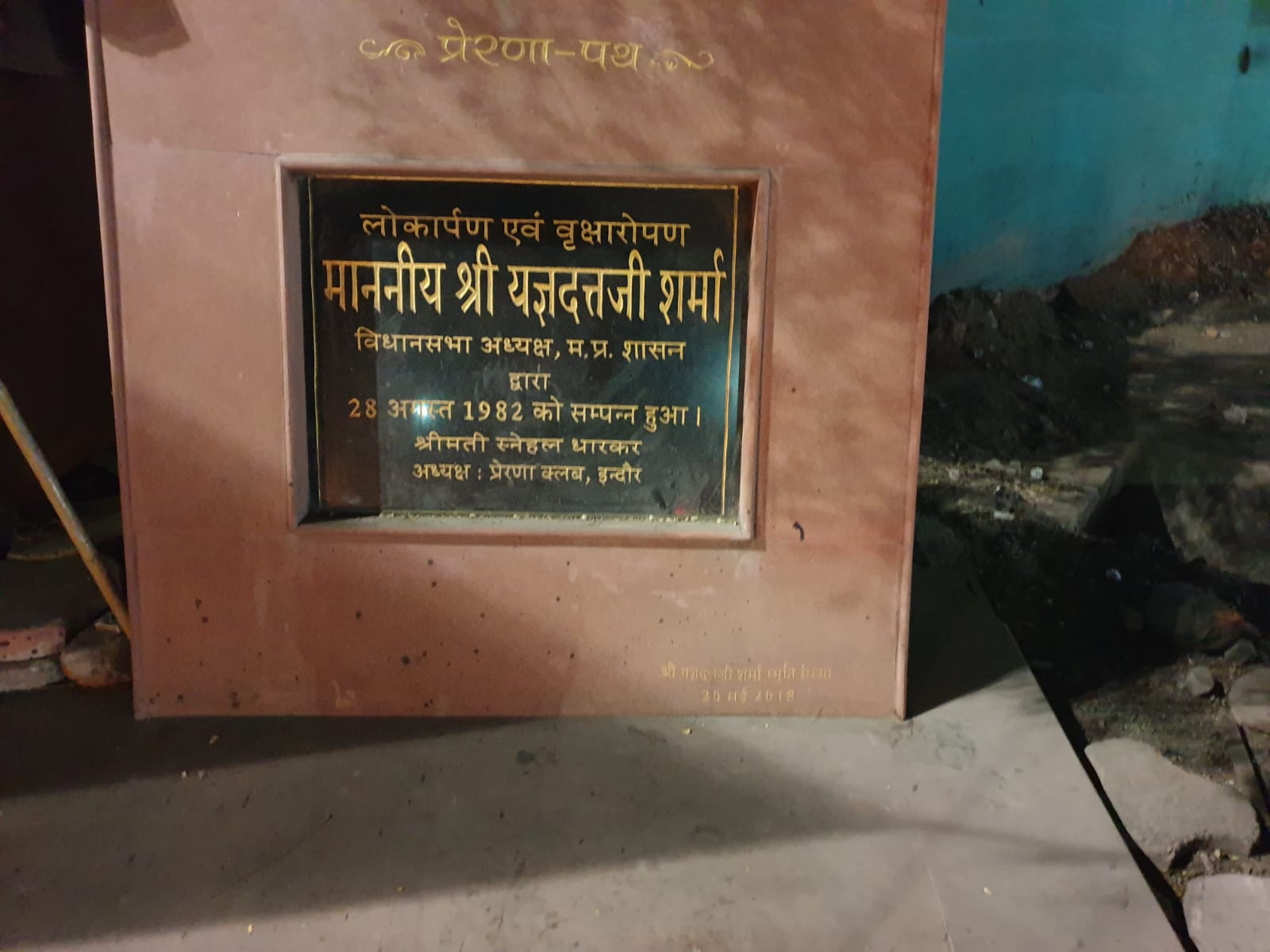
The Monument in Indore Located at MTH Compound, Maharani Road, Indore, Madhya Pradesh

== Early life ==
Born on 5 April 1936 in Jhalawar, Rajasthan
