= Prakash Chandra Sethi =

8th Chief Minister of Madhya Pradesh

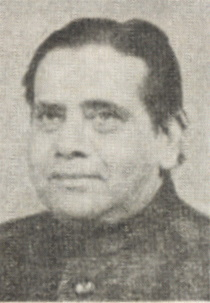

Minister of Home Affairs
- In office 2 September 1982 – 19 July 1984
- Preceded by: R. Venkataraman
- Succeeded by: P. V. Narasimha Rao

8th Chief Minister of Madhya Pradesh
- In office 29 January 1972 – 22 December 1975
- Preceded by: Shyama Charan Shukla
- Succeeded by: Shyama Charan Shukla

Personal details
- Born: 19 October 1919 Jhalrapatan, Jhalawar State, British India
- Died: 21 February 1996 (aged 76) Indore, Madhya Pradesh, India
- Party: Indian National Congress
- Spouse: Smt. Kamla Devi

Prakash Chandra Sethi (19 October 1919 – 21 February 1996) was an Indian National Congress politician who served as Minister of Home Affairs (1982–84) and as the 8th Chief Minister of Madhya Pradesh (1972–75).

He was twice the chief minister of the state from 29 January 1972 to 22 March 1972 and 23 March 1972 to 22 December 1975.

Ideologically, he appreciated people like Shankar Dayal Sharma, Ravi Shankar Shukla, Guru Radha Kishan, and Gandhian Mahesh Dutt Mishra. Though not much is talked about him as a politician, he was from the school of thought of being accessible to the public. Sethi was respected by the people of Indore and nation for his work.

During his tenure in the central government, Sethi was elected from the Indore constituency. He also held a number of positions in the Central Government of India - Home Minister, Defense Minister, Minister of External Affairs, Finance Minister, Railways, and Housing and Development.

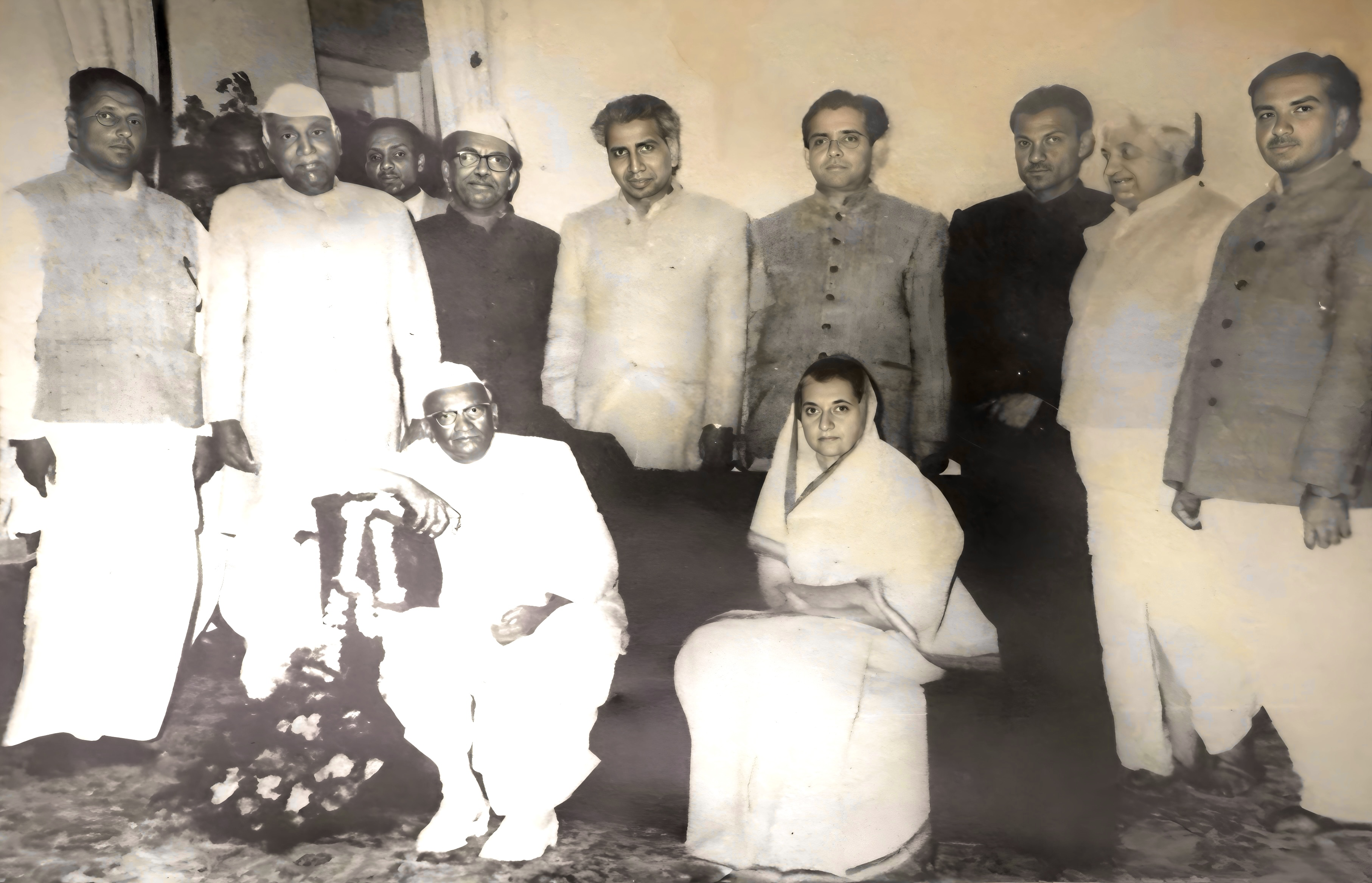
Indira Gandhi, then Prime Minister of India; Dwarka Prasad Mishra, former Chief Minister of Madhya Pradesh; and Prakash Chandra Sethi at the residence of Narayan Prasad Shukla.

He is also known for his efforts for surrender of dacoits from Chambal region of Madhya Pradesh in 1976 while holding the post of Union Petroleum and Chemicals Minister.
