= Geeta Bhawan =

- Suburb
- Location in Madhya Pradesh, India Geeta Bhawan (India)
- Coordinates: 22.42°N 75.54°E
- Country: India
- State: Madhya Pradesh
- District: Indore District
- City: Indore

Government
  - Type: Municipal Corporation
  - Body: Indore Municipal Corporation (IMC)
  - Mayor: Malini Laxmansingh Gaur
  - District Collector: Manish Singh, IAS

Population (2010)
  - Total: 10,000

Languages
  - Official: Hindi
- Time zone: UTC+5:30 (IST)
- PIN: 452001
- Vehicle registration: MP-09
- Lok Sabha constituency: Indore
- Vidhan Sabha constituency: Indore-5
- Website: imcindore.mp.gov.in

Geeta Bhawan is a residential locality in the city Indore, Madhya Pradesh, India. Real estate prices have shot up and are comparable to any posh areas of Indore, in large part because of the continued boom of immigrants.

The elected Member of the Legislative Assembly is Mahendra Hardia.

== History ==
The area has historically been home to the campus of MGM Medical College. The area of Geeta Bhawan is known for its popular Shree Geeta Bhawan temple which is under the subsidiary of Geeta Bhawan Trust, Indore. The trust also runs a school, hospital, hostels and resorts. The Geeta Bhawan Trust has many premier hotels of Indore such as Hotel Luxembur, Hotel Taj (3 star), Hotel Jai etc. Geeta Bhawan Vishesh Hospital is also one of the prominent hospital of the city located at Geeta Bhawan. There is also one homeopathic college in the area. There is also one complex which consist of many food restaurants, motels etc.

== Geography ==
The locality consists of not only IDA Flats but also some societies i.e Cooperative Group Housing Societies. Other most popular noted well maintained, expensive and secure societies in are because of its demand, connectivity, more schools, entertainment, frequent purchase of flats and kothis. The rapid urbanisation of Indore has led to mushrooming of such societies all over the city, The area together holds around 300 private houses too.

Residential Colonies: Kanchan Bagh, Manoramaganj, Navratan Bagh, Sai City, Badshah Residency, Manorama Garden, Gulmohar Society, Brajwasi, Shams Avenue, Mahakoshal Point, Indra Residency, Diamond Residency, Sudama House
Arterial Roads: Agra-Bombay Road (NH 52)

== Politics ==
Geeta Bhawan area falls under the Indore-5 Assembly Constituency in Indore District. The current elected Member is Mahendra Hardia from the BJP.

== Transport ==
The nearest railway station is Indore Junction railway station. Public transport such as autos, taxis, magic-vans, city buses are readily available. Bus Routes passing by the main Dr. Ambedkar Square (Geeta Bhawan Square) are:-

S. No.	Route No.	Start	End
1	Zero imission Bus	Rajiv Gandhi Square	Dewas Naka

== Places of interest ==
- Mahatma Gandhi Memorial Medical College, Indore: A premier government medical college and research centre.
- Atal Indore City Transport Service Limited Office: The Operators of Indore City Bus and Indore BRTS and Chartered Bus.
- Geeta Bhawan Temple
- Geeta Bhawan Hospital
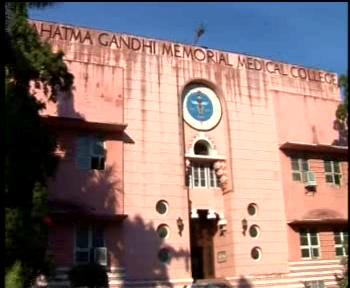
MGM Medical College
