= Ring Road, Indore =

Road around Indore, India

Ring Road

Route information
- Length: 21 km (13 mi)

Major junctions
- North end: Dewas Naka
- Mahalaxmi, Malviya Nagar, Khajrana Ganesh Temple, Bengali Square, World Cup Square, IT Park, Rajiv Gandhi Square, Gopur Square, Phooti Kothi
- South end: Chandan Nagar

Location
- Country: India
- State: Madhya Pradesh

Highway system
- Roads in India; Expressways; National; State; Asian; State Highways in Madhya Pradesh

The Ring Road is a 21-kilometre (13 mi), six-lane ring road encircling the city of Indore, Madhya Pradesh, India. It is built by Indore Development Authority (IDA).

== Construction ==
=== Road ===
The road is a six-lane bituminous road, along with a bi-lane service road on both sides near major junctures.

=== Bridges ===
The whole stretch of Ring Road consists of four functional flyovers at Bengali Square, World Cup Square, Teen Imli Square and the Kesarbagh Rail Overbridge over the Akola-Ratlam line.

== History ==
In July 2022, the authorities announced plans to construct a 55-kilometre-long (34 mi) Outer Ring Road to decrease the load as well as to extend the current ring road.

== See also ==
- List of state highways in Madhya Pradesh
