= Khandwa Naka =

- Suburb
- Location in Madhya Pradesh, India Khandwa Naka (India)
- Coordinates: 22.6740478°N 75.879323°E
- Country: India
- State: Madhya Pradesh
- District: Indore District
- City: Indore
- Zone: 13
- Ward: 77-Bilawali

Government
  - Type: Municipal Corporation
  - Body: Indore Municipal Corporation (IMC)
  - Mayor: Pushyamitra Bhargava
  - District Collector: Manish Singh, IAS
  - Corporator: Pushpendra Singh Chauhan
- Time zone: UTC+5:30 (IST)
- PIN: 452001
- Vehicle registration: MP-09
- Lok Sabha constituency: Indore
- Vidhan Sabha constituency: Rau
- Website: imcindore.mp.gov.in

Khandwa Naka is a sub-urb in the largest city and commercial hub Indore in the state of Madhya Pradesh, India.

== History ==
Khandwa Naka has been home to the vast campus of Indore branch of Radha Soami Satsang Beas. It is also home to a slew of educational institutes, schools and colleges. The century-old Bilawali Lake is situated near Khandwa Naka.

== Geography ==
The area consists of various residential colonies. It borders IT Park on the North-West, Tejaji Nagar on the Southern side. Residential Colonies: Bhawna Nagar, Ekta Nagar, Ganesh Nagar, Krishnodaya Nagar, Kushwah Ji Ka Bagicha, Sant Nagar, Shri Yantra Nagar, Shri Vihar
Arterial Roads: Indore-Khandwa Road (MP SH 27)

== Transport ==
=== Rail ===
The Indore Junction railway station is the nearest railway station. Public transport such as autos, taxis, magic-vans, city buses are readily available.

=== Bus ===
Khandwa Naka being located on the arterial Indore-Khandwa Road (National Highway 347BG (India)), several City Bus routes serve the area. The bus routes passing by the main Khandwa Naka Square (also known as Radha Swami) are:

| Route No. | Start | End |
|---|---|---|
| C-3 | Tejaji Nagar | Gandhi Nagar |
| M-4 | Tejaji Nagar | Chhota Bangarda |
| N-5 | Tejaji Nagar | Mangliya Toll Naka |
| M-6 | Tejaji Nagar | Rajwada |
| M-19 | Bhanwarkuan | Simrol |

== Political ==
Bhanwarkuan area falls under the Rau Assembly Constituency in Indore District. The current elected Member is Jitu Patwari from the Congress.

== Education ==
Khandwa Naka area has an array of educational institutions starting from Nursery to Colleges. It has CBSE as well as MP Board affiliated schools namely NDPS, a school of Indore. Holy Cross School, Gurunanak Public School, Guru Harkishan School, Vedant Pre-School and Queens' College.

MRSC, a reputed college and IET-DAVV, the institute of Engineering and Technology and Arihant College.

== Places of Interest ==
- Bilawali Lake: A tourism spot
- Radha Soami Satsang Beas, Indore
- Holy Spirit Convent
- Swami Narayan Temple
- Gurudwara Shri Guru Harkishan Saheb Ji
