= Holkar Science College =

Indian science college in Madhya Pradesh

Government Model Autonomous Holkar Science College
- Motto in English: Lead me from Darkness to Light
- Type: Public
- Established: 1891; 135 years ago
- Affiliations: UGC
- Principal: Dr. Suresh Silawat
- Location: Indore, Madhya Pradesh, India
- Campus: Urban
- Website: collegeholkar.org

Holkar Science College, officially Government Model Autonomous Holkar Science College, also known as Holkar College, is an institute in Indore, Madhya Pradesh. It was established on 10 June 1891 by His Highness Maharajadhiraja Raj Rajeshwar Sawai Shri Sir Shivaji Rao Holkar Bahadur XII, the erstwhile ruler of Indore belonging to the Holkar dynasty of the Marathas. The biggest government science institute in the state, has been ranked third among government autonomous colleges in the country by Education World Rankings 2020-21.

In 1985, the Government Holkar Science College, Indore was awarded the title of a Model College by the state Government of Madhya Pradesh and in the year 1988 the college earned the status of an autonomous college.

Holkar Science College in 1964

== Campus ==
Front Garden, HSC

Holkar College campus is located in the South area of East Indore. It is situated in an area between known as Bhanwar Kua which has a high concentration of cultural and academic institutions, including the Indore University, Central Museum, Institute of Management Studies, Cystal IT Park and the Kamla Nehru Zoological Park. The Holkar College HSC has multiple halls throughout the campus along Indore BRTS and various lectures for science students are conducted within these halls, some major buildings are including the Main Building, Red Building, Yeshwant Hall and Chemistry Block Building.

== Faculties and Departments ==
The College has Chemistry, Mathematics and Physics departments. The institute receives funds from the state but is autonomous with regards to administration and conduct of examinations. The HSC offers a number of courses in the field of science. HSC's research and teaching is organised within a network of faculties and academic departments which includes:

Holkar Science College Main Entrance

- Department of Biochemistry
- Department of Bioinformatics
- Department of Biotechnology & Bioinformatics
- Department of Botany
- Department of Chemistry
- Department of Computer Science

The Department of Computer Science was established in academic year 2000–2001. It is an autonomous department under Govt. Holkar Science College affiliated DAVV, Indore.

- Department of Electronics
- Department of Entrepreneurship
- Department of Fisheries
- Department of forensic science
- Department of Geology
- Department of Language
- Department of Mathematics
- Department of Microbiology
- Department of Pharmaceutical Chemistry
- Department of Physics
- Department of Seed Technology
- Department of Statistics
- Department of Zoology
- Department of Cyber Security
- Department of Economics

Admission is restricted to students domicile to Madhya Pradesh.

== Alumni ==
- Narayan Prasad Shukla
- Salim Khan
- Vipin Singh
- Rajeeva Laxman Karandikar
