= Bhanwarkuan =

Coordinates: 22.6906289°N 75.8695624°E

- Suburb
- Interactive map of Bhanwarkuan
- Country: India
- State: Madhya Pradesh
- District: Indore District
- City: Indore
- Zone: 13
- Ward: 64-Chitawad; 74-Vishnupuri

Government
  - Type: Municipal Corporation
  - Body: Indore Municipal Corporation (IMC)
  - Mayor: Malini Laxmansingh Gaur
  - District Collector: Shivam Verma, IAS
  - Corporator: Seema Virang (Ward 64); Surendra Singh (Ward 74)

Population (2010)
  - Total: 165,000

Languages
  - Official: Hindi
- Time zone: UTC+5:30 (IST)
- PIN: 452001
- Vehicle registration: MP-09
- Lok Sabha constituency: Indore
- Vidhan Sabha constituency: Rau
- Website: imcindore.mp.gov.in

Bhanwarkuan is a sub-urban locality of Indore, India.

== History ==
The area has historically been home to the Takshashila Campus of Devi Ahilya Vishwavidyalaya, ever since its inception in 1956. Also, the Holkar Science College has had its academic campus in Bhanwarkuan for over a century.

== Geography ==
A lot of motels, hotels and housing society are blooming up here. There are more than 15 sectors which houses more than 5000 houses. A lot of the residential areas are occupied by students who study at various colleges on a rented basis. There is a presence of the Residential Campus of DAVV and Holkar Science College.

Neighbouring suburbs: Navlakha, Khandwa Naka, Khatiwala Tank
Arterial Roads: Agra-Bombay Road (NH-52), Ujjain-Indore-Khandwa Road (MP SH-27)

== Politics ==
Bhanwarkuan area falls under the Rau Assembly Constituency in Indore District. The current elected Member is Jitu Patwari from the Congress.

== Transport ==
=== Rail ===
The nearest railway station is Saifee Nagar railway station. However, it is just a flag station. The Indore Junction railway station is not too far away. Public transport such as autos, taxis, magic-vans, city buses are readily available.

=== Bus ===
Bhanwarkuan being located on the arterial A.B. Road (Agra–Bombay NH-52), several City Bus routes serve the area, with fares ranging from ₹10.00 to ₹25.00 or even more depending on distance. Bus Routes passing by The Nayak Tantya Bhil Square (Bhanwarkuan) are

Route No.	Start	End
C-3	Tejaji Nagar	Gandhi Nagar
M-4	Tejaji Nagar	Chhota Bangarda
R-5	Aurobindo Hospital	Mhow Naka
M-6	Tejaji Nagar	Rajwada
M-19	Bhanwarkuan	Simrol
M-37	Kanadiya Bypass	Gandhi Nagar

== Places of interest ==
- Atal Bihari Vajpayee Regional Park: A well-developed natural landscape and park alongside the Pipliyapala Lake.
- Devi Ahilya Vishwavidyalaya: A State University of Madhya Pradesh
- Holkar Science College: A esteemed autonomous college of Indore
- Satprakashan Sanchar Kendra: An audio-video processing centre
- INOX Sapna Sangeeta: A multiplex for movie-goers
