= Mahalaxmi, Indore =

Mahalaxmi
- Suburb
- Country: India
- State: Madhya Pradesh
- District: Indore District
- City: Indore

Government
  - Type: Municipal Corporation
  - Body: Indore Municipal Corporation (IMC)
  - Mayor: Malini Laxmansingh Gaur
  - District Collector: Manish Singh, IAS

Languages
  - Official: Hindi
- Time zone: UTC+5:30 (IST)
- PIN: 452001
- Vehicle registration: MP-09
- Lok Sabha constituency: Indore
- Vidhan Sabha constituency: Indore-2
- Website: imcindore.mp.gov.in

Mahalaxmi is a suburb of Indore.

== Geography ==
Mahalaxmi is situated in the outskirts of the north east of the city, adjacent to the eastern ring road and is a hub of many high rise buildings. In the 2000s, people have moved to the peripheries of city after seeing the development potential. Suburbs along the ring road and areas like Mahalaxmi, Tulsi Nagar, Neeranjanpur, Rajendra Nagar and many more were carved out. With the development, many people from other places migrated to the city and opted for cheaper accommodations in the suburbs. Neighbouring suburbs: Dewas Naka, Vijay Nagar, Malviya Nagar
Arterial Roads: Agra-Bombay Road (NH 52)

== Politics ==
Mahalaxmi area falls under the Indore-2 Assembly Constituency in Indore District. The current elected Member is Ramesh Mendola from the BJP.

== Transport ==
The nearest railway station is Laxmibai Nagar Junction railway station. However, it is just a basic station. The Indore Junction railway station is the main junction to catch trains. Public transport such as autos, taxis, magic-vans, city buses are readily available.

Dewas Naka being located on the arterial A.B. Road (Agra–Bombay Road NH 52), several City Bus routes serve the area, with fares ranging from ₹10.00 to ₹25.00 or even more depending on distance. Bus Routes passing by main Maharaja Chhatrasal Square are

S. No.	Route No.	Start	End
1	12	Chhoti Gwaltoli	Nipania Bus Stop
2	25	Rajwada	Nipania Bus Stop
3	27	Sirpur Lake	Dewas Naka

== Places of interest ==
- Hotel Radisson, a 5-star hotel
- Bombay Hospital
- Progressive Education, a school
- Star Square, a place for hopping onto buses on Indore-Dewas-Bhopal routes
