= Atal Indore City Transport Service Limited =

Public transport organisation

Atal Indore City Transport Service Corporation
- Abbreviation: AICTSL
- Formation: 1 December 2005; 20 years ago
- Type: Public body
- Legal status: Public Limited Company within IMC
- Purpose: Transport authority
- Headquarters: Residency Area
- Location: Indore
- Region served: Greater Indore, Ujjain, Malwa, Bhopal
- Official language: English; Hindi
- Chairman: Mayor of Indore; Pushyamitra Bhargav
- Main organ: Indore City Bus; Indore BRTS; Indore Monorail; Indore Intercity; Metro Taxi
- Parent organisation: IDA; IMC
- Staff: 16000
- Website: citybusindore.com

Atal Indore City Transport Service Ltd. (AICTSL), is the main public transport operator of Indore. It operates 188 buses on many routes, including Mhow city transport service and Pithampur city transport service. It is the largest CNG-powered bus service operator in central India. It also operates app based Bicycle service across indore.

AICTSL operates intercity bus services in five cities: Bhopal, Mhow, Rau, Hatod and Sawer. The corporation also operates a taxicab service called Metro Taxi, which gives service in Indore and is also used by commuters to travel to Bhopal, Ujjain and other parts of Malwa.

== History ==
The company was incorporated on 1 December 2005 with an objective to operate and manage the public transport system of Indore. It was then named Atal Indore City Transport Service Corporation Ltd. Seven key people were the Board of Directors. Indore Municipal Corporation and Indore Development Authority invested an authorised capital of Rs 25 Lacs jointly. The execution was the responsibility of Vivek Aggarwal (Collector, Indore). The model decided was of public-private partnership.

ICTSL, which is a Nodal Implementation and executive agency for city transport, implement works with other agencies like Indore Municipal Corporation, Indore Development Authority and Madhya Pradesh Public Work Department.

== Routes ==
AICTSL operates many routes not only in Indore, but also many inter-city routes. The Volvo Buses operate around seven depots. The company has decided to start bus services connecting several districts including Khandwa, Dhar, Khargone, Barwani, Ujjain and Dewas.

=== Intra-Indore bus services ===
AICTSL services in Indore has a vastly distributed network of bus services. It connects almost every part of Indore with this network of buses. The most prominent of these are the AB Road and the MG Road services, interconnecting all parts of the city with a great frequency of buses until approximately 11:30 pm. Colour coding of routes and buses and their numbering has been carried out.

- All blue buses move towards Rajwada and will touch MG Road.
- All magenta buses move along the AB Road and will touch AB Road.
- All orange buses move towards the airport along the Bond Road and will reach the Bada Ganpati Square.

==== Metro Taxi service ====
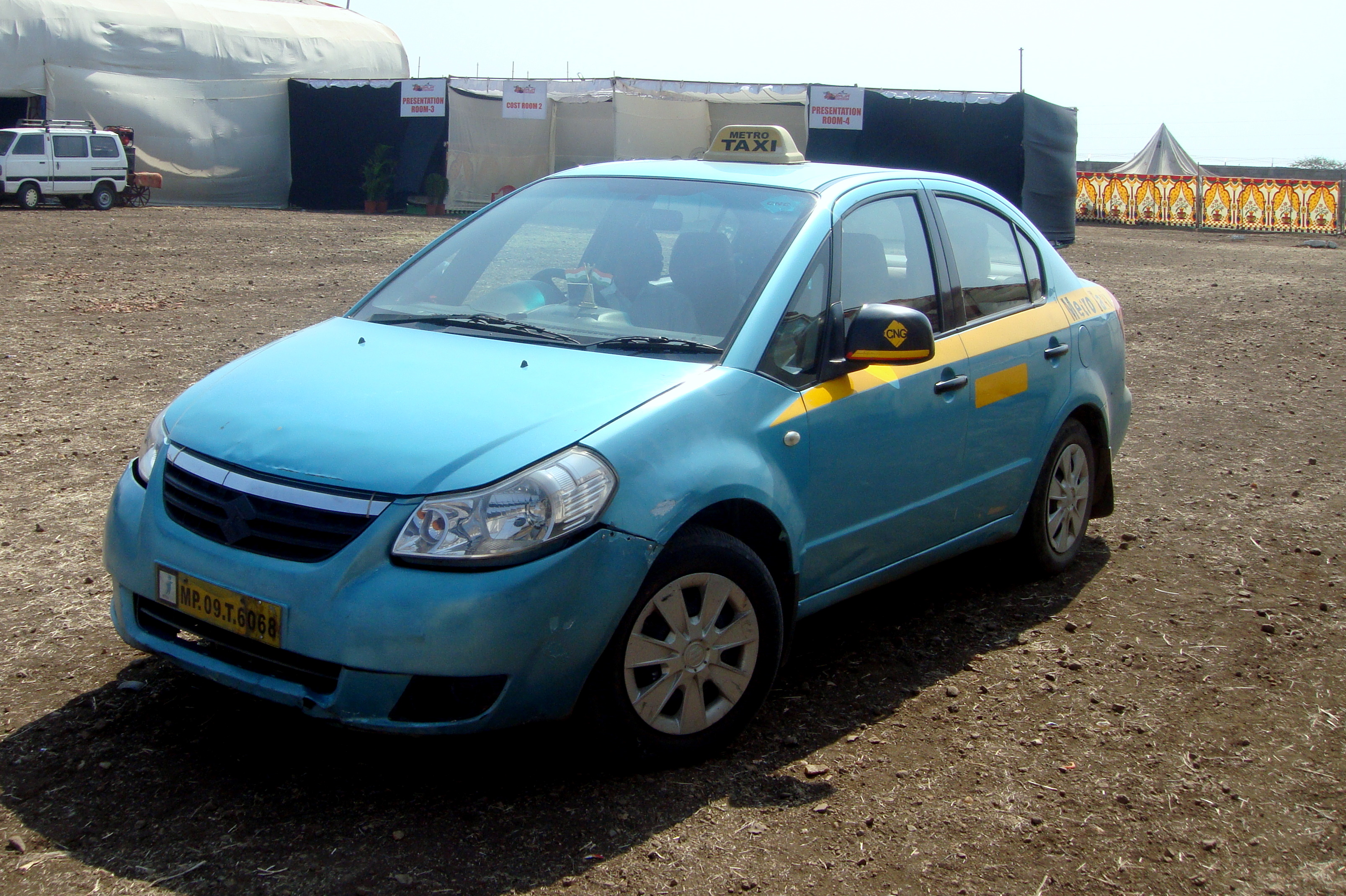
Metro Taxi in Indore

AICTSL started the City Taxi transport service under its existing institutional setup in the lines of City Bus Services. It is a kind of demand responsive, on-call taxi service that uses GPS system. The Metro Taxi system is geared towards affluent Indorites and charges Rs. 15 per km until 11.00 pm and Rs. 20 per km from 11.00 to 6.00 am. Tetro taxi under ACTL operates day tours for places such as Omkareshwar, Ujjain, Dewas, Mandu and Maheshwar.
