= C21 Malhar Mall, Indore =

C21 Malhar Mall
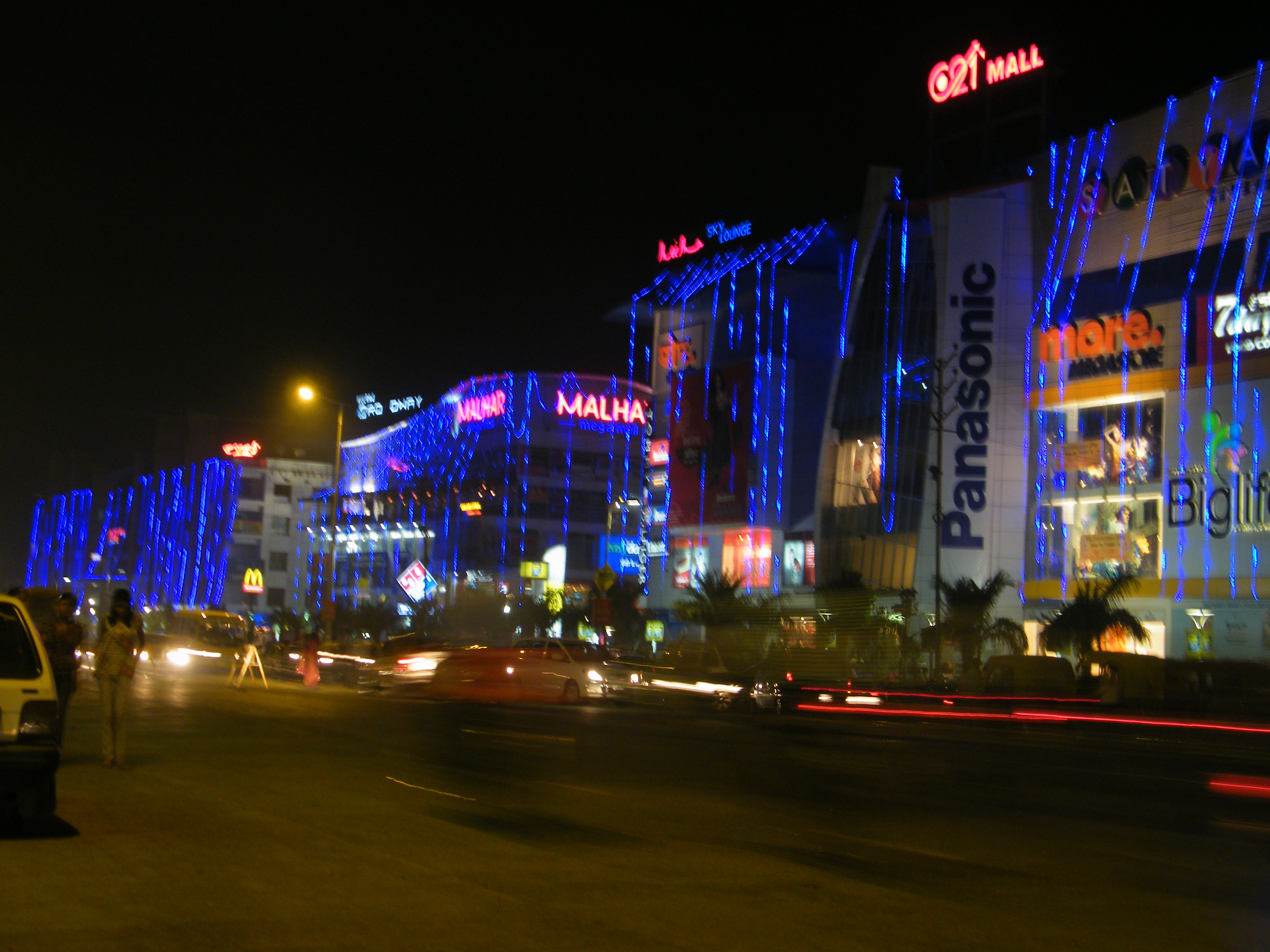
- C21 Malhar Mall front view at night
- Location: Indore, India
- Coordinates: 22.7441181°N 75.8940227°E
- Address: Scheme No.54, Vijay Nagar, Indore – 452001
- Floor area: 5,25,000 sq.ft.
- Parking: Multilevel
- Website: c21malls.in

C21 Malhar Mall is a shopping mall in the city of Indore in India. The name represents the twin malls C21 Mall & Malhar Mega Mall located adjacent to each other in Vijay Nagar. Both the malls are connected via walkways at two junctions in air as well as the ground.

== C21 Mall ==
=== Stores ===
- Lifestyle (department store) has its flagship store in C21 mall since 2013. The store carries latest trendy Branded apparels like Menswear, Ladieswear, Kidswear, Footwear, Luggages, Handbags, sunglasses, Fragrances, Watches, Cosmetics among other varieties. Store is renovated recently & has a better customer experience.
- Forever 21 opened its 21st store in the mall in December 2017.

=== Multiplex ===
- The mall features an INOX multiplex. INOX developed the multiplex with 9 screens and 1486 seats, including INSIGNIA, MX4D and Club with a focus on upgrading the technology as well as experience.

== Malhar Mega Mall ==
=== Multiplex ===
- The mall features a Rajhans Cinemas multiplex.

== See also ==
- Treasure Island Next Mall
- Phoenix Citadel Mall, Indore
