= Satya Sai Chouraha =

- suburb
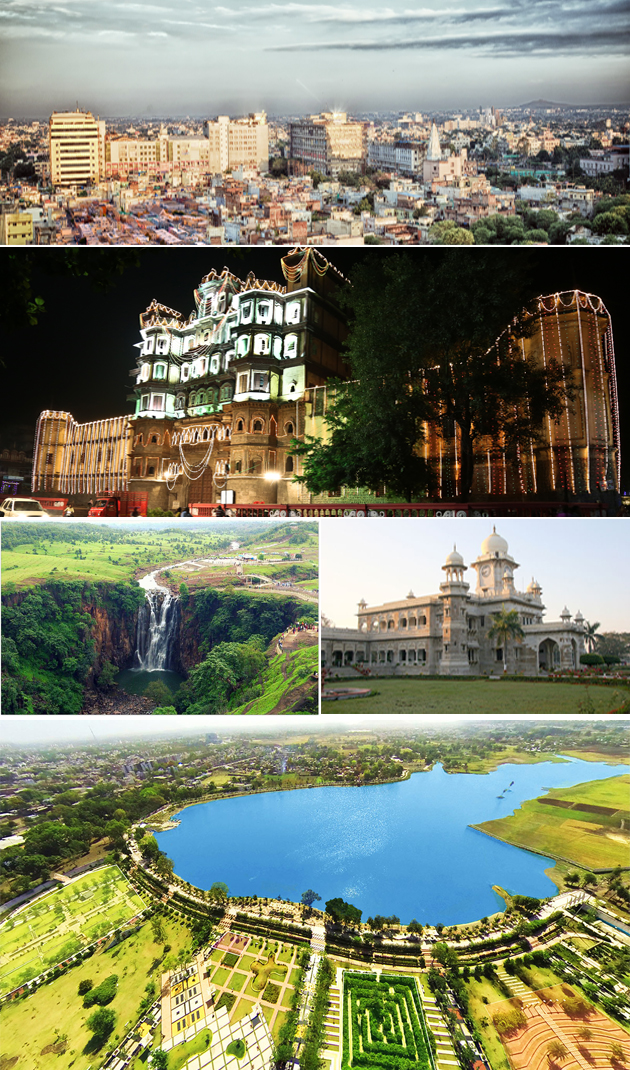
- Skyline of Satya Sai Area

- Location in Madhya Pradesh, India Satya Sai Chouraha (India)
- Coordinates: 22.42°N 75.54°E
- Country: India
- State: Madhya Pradesh
- District: Indore

Population (2010)
  - Total: 25,000

Languages
  - Official: Hindi
- Time zone: UTC+5:30 (IST)
- PIN: 452003
- Telephone code: 0731
- Vehicle registration: 09
- Nearest city: Dewas

Satya Sai is a residential locality within the largest city and commercial hub Indore, Madhya Pradesh, India. Real estate prices have shot up here and are comparable to any posh areas of Indore, in large part because of the continued boom of immigrants. The area is named after the school Shri Satya Sai Vidya Vihar, which is among the prominent English schools of Indore.

== Outlook ==
Satya Sai is known for its popular Sathya Sai School] as well as the Ashram run by the school ashram samiti. It is a link for the prominent 20,000 bedded Bombay Hospital, the only NABH accredited hospital of the city.

== Society Flats in Satya Sai ==
A lot of society are blooming up here along with hotels and motels. The housing society include :

- BCM Heights
- RCM
- Utkarsh
- Swarga Parisar
- Nirmal Udyan etc.

== Transportation ==
=== Road ===
==== Bus Routes ====
There are most preferable city buses, which connects the area with other localities :

S.no.	Route no.	Start	End Place
1	04 (IV)	Vaishali Nagar	Panchwati
2	05 (V)	Arvindo Hospital	Mhow Naka

The Dewas - Pithampur Bus Service by-pass whole Indore, connects Satya Sai. Besides this, many city vans, metro taxi, star cab, service connects it to other localities of Indore.
