= List of things named after Madan Mohan Malaviya =

The following things have been named after Madan Mohan Malaviya, an educational reformist and activist, notable for his role in the Indian independence movement.

- Madan Mohan Malaviya Stadium
- Madan Mohan Malaviya University of Technology
- Mahamana Express
- Malaviya National Institute of Technology, Jaipur
- Malviya Nagar, Delhi Assembly constituency
- Malviya Nagar (Delhi)
- Malviya Nagar metro station
- Malviya Nagar (Rajasthan)
- Malviya Bridge
- Malviya Nagar (Madhya Pradesh)
- Malviya Nagar, Rajasthan Assembly constituency
