= Akash Tripathi =

IAS officer

- Born: 22 June 1975; Rewa, Madhya Pradesh, India
- Education: SGSITS and IMS
- Occupation: Indian Administrative Service
- Employer: Government of India
- Title: MD of Solar Energy Corporation of India

Akash Tripathi (born 22 June 1975) is an Indian Administrative Service (IAS) officer. He started a his career in the civil services in 1998. Currently he is managing director of Solar Energy Corporation of India.

== Early life and education ==
Tripathi was born on 22 June 1975 in Rewa district of the Indian state of Madhya Pradesh. He studied at Shri Govindram Seksaria Institute of Technology and Science, Indore, Madhya Pradesh. While he did his MBA in Finance from the Institute of Management Studies, Devi Ahilya University, Indore.

== Career ==
He joined the Indian Administrative Service as a Probationary Officer in 1999 after clearing the Civil Services Examination. And currently he is serving as Managing Director of Solar Energy Corporation of India. Previously he has done worked as MD and CEO of Digital India Corporation (DIC), CEO of India Semiconductor Mission and CEO of MyGov.in.
