= Phoenix Pride of India Mall =

Phoenix Mall, Indore
- Location: Indore, India
- Coordinates: 22°44′47.7312″N 75°56′11.0868″E
- Address: NH 52 Service Road, Opp. Best Price, Indore
- Opened: 1 December 2022
- Developer: Phoenix Mills Ltd.
- Owner: Phoenix Mills Ltd.
- Num. of stores: 253
- Num. of anchor tenants: 16
- Floor area: 1,000,000 sq. ft.
- Floors: 3
- Parking: Multilevel
- Website: https://www.phoenixcitadel.in/

Phoenix Pride of India Mall earlier known as Phoenix Citadel Mall is a shopping mall in the city of Indore, Madhya Pradesh, India. It is owned by Phoenix Mills Ltd., they operate 10 malls across 7 cities of India.

The mall is spread over 3 floors and has a dedicated building for parking. It has 1,000,000 leasing area for shopping brands. It has a dedicated open area in front of the mall as well. In August 2026, its brand positioning identity was changed to Pride of India and the refresh was inaugurated by Tilak Varma.

== Facilities ==
=== Stores ===
- Lifestyle opened its second store in Phoenix citadel mall in November 2022. Lifestyle store is part of Landmarkgroup Dubai. The store carries latest trendy Branded apparels like Menswear, Ladieswear, Kidswear, Footwear, Luggages, Handbags, sunglasses, Fragrances, Watches, Cosmetics among other varieties.
- Kimirica, a luxury brand opened its flagship store recently at the mall.

=== Multiplex ===
- The mall features an INOX multiplex along with its premium offering Insignia.

=== Food court ===
- There is a dedicated food court area with ample seating space.

== See also ==
- Treasure Island Next Mall
- C21 Mall, Indore
