= 2020 in aquatic sports =

This article lists the in the water and on the water forms of aquatic sports for 2020.

== 2020 Summer Olympics (Aquatics) ==
- April 21 – 26: 2020 FINA Diving World Cup in (Japan) Tokyo
- April 30 – May 3: FINA Artistic Swimming Olympic Games Qualification Tournament 2020 in (Japan) Tokyo
- May 30 – 31: FINA Olympic Marathon Swim Qualifier 2020 in (Japan) Fukuoka

== 2020 Summer Paralympics (Swimming) ==
=== International and continental competitions ===
- March 21 – April 5: 2020 South American Swimming Championships in (Argentina) Mar del Plata
- April 18 – 24: 2020 African Swimming Championships in South Africa
- May 11 – 24: 2020 European Aquatics Championships in (Hungary) Budapest
- June 15 – 21: 2020 Oceania Swimming Championships in (Fiji) Suva
- November 7 – 17: 2020 Asian Swimming Championships in (Philippines) New Clark City
- TBD for December: 2020 FINA World Swimming Championships (25 m) in (United Arab Emirates) Abu Dhabi

== Artistic swimming ==
=== FINA Artistic Swimming Olympic Games Qualification Tournament 2020 ===
- April 30 – May 3: in (Japan) Tokyo

=== 2020 FINA Artistic Swimming World Series ===
- March 6 – 8: ASWS #1 in (France) Paris
- March 27 – 29: ASWS #2 in (Egypt) Hurghada
- April 3 – 5: ASWS #3 in (Greece) Alexandroupolis
- April 10 – 12: ASWS #4 in (Hungary) Budapest
- April 17 – 19: ASWS #5 in (Russia) Kazan
- April 23 – 25: ASWS #6 in (China) Suzhou
- May 29 – 31: ASWS #7 in (Spain) Madrid
- June 12 – 14: ASWS #8 in (United States) Ypsilanti
- June 19 – 21: ASWS #9 (Super Final) in (Canada) Windsor

=== FINA World Junior Artistic Swimming Championships 2020 ===
- August 24 – 30: 2020 FINA World Junior Synchronised Swimming Championships in (Canada) Quebec City

== Canoeing ==
=== 2020 Summer Olympics (Canoeing) ===
- March 26 – 29: 2020 Canoe Sprint Asian Olympic Qualifier in (Thailand) Pattaya
- May 6 & 7: 2020 Canoe Sprint European Olympic Qualifier in (Czech Republic) Račice
- May 21 – 24: 2020 ICF Canoe Sprint Final Olympic Qualifier in (Germany) Duisburg
- July 26 – August 8: Canoeing at the 2020 Summer Olympics in (Japan) Tokyo
  - July 26 – 31: Canoe slalom
  - August 3 – 8: Canoe sprint

=== 2020 Summer Paralympics (Paracanoeing) ===
- May 21 – 24: 2020 ICF Paracanoe World Championships & Paralympic Qualifier in (Germany) Duisburg

=== World canoeing championships ===
- July 7: 2020 ICF Junior & Canoe Slalom World in (Slovenia) Ljubljana / Tacen
- July 10 – 12: 2020 Canoe Sprint Non-Olympic Events World Championships in (Hungary) Szeged
- July 16 – 19: 2020 ICF Junior & Canoe Sprint World in (Germany) Brandenburg
- August 14 – 16: 2020 ICF Masters Canoe Sprint World Championship in (Ukraine) Ternopil
- September 24 – 27: 2020 Canoe Slalom Non-Olympic Events World Championships in (Germany) Markkleeberg

=== Canoe sprint ===
==== 2020 ICF Canoe Sprint Olympic Qualifier ====
- May 21 – 22: in Duisburg, Germany

==== 2020 continental canoe sprint championships ====
- February 14 – 16: 2020 Oceania Canoe Sprint Championships (Olympic Qualifier) in (Australia) Penrith
- March 26 – 29: 2020 Asian Canoe Sprint Championships (Olympic Qualifier) in (Thailand) Pattaya
- May 7 – 10: 2020 Pan American Canoe Sprint Championships (Olympic Qualifier) in (Chile) Curauma
- June 4 – 7: 2020 Canoe Sprint European Championships in (Romania) Bascov
- July 2 – 5: 2020 ECA Junior And U23 Canoe Sprint European Championships in (Russia) Moscow

==== 2020 Canoe Sprint World Cup ====
- May 7 – 10: CSWC #1 in (Czech Republic) Račice
- May 21 – 24: CSWC #2 (final) in (Germany) Duisburg

=== Canoe slalom ===
==== 2020 International Canoe Slalom Championships ====
- February 1 – 3: 2020 Oceania Canoe Slalom Championships (Olympic Qualifier) in (New Zealand) Auckland
- March 22 – 24: 2020 Asian Canoe Slalom Championships (Olympic Qualifier) in (Thailand) Pattaya
- April 3 – 5: 2020 Pan-American Canoe Slalom Championships (Olympic Qualifier) in (Brazil) Rio de Janeiro (Cancelled)
- May 15 – 17: 2020 European Canoe Slalom Championships (Olympic Qualifier) at (United Kingdom) Broxbourne (Cancelled)
- June 6–7: 2020 European Open Canoe Slalom Championships in (Italy) Merano
- August 13 – 16: ECA Junior and U23 Canoe Slalom European Championships in (Poland) Kraków
- September 18 – 20: 2020 European Canoe Slalom Championships (Olympic Qualifier) at (Czech Republic) Prague

==== 2020 Canoe Slalom World Cup ====
- June 5 – 7: CSWC #1 in (Italy) Ivrea (Cancelled)
- June 12 – 14: CSWC #2 in (France) Pau (Postponed to November 6 – 8)
- August 21 – 23: CSWC #3 in (Slovakia) Liptovský Mikuláš (Cancelled)
- September 18 – 20: CSWC #4 in (Czech Republic) Prague (Cancelled)
- September 24 – 27: CSWC #5 (final) in (Germany) Markkleeberg (Cancelled)
- September 16 – 18: CSWC #1 in (Slovenia) Tacen (Replacement for Cancelled Ivrea World Cup)

==== 2020 Canoe Slalom European Cup ====
- June 1: EJCCS #1 in (Italy) Valstagna
- June 13 – 14: EJCCS #2 in (Italy) Valstagna

=== Canoe Marathon ===
==== 2020 International Canoe Marathon Championships ====
- August 24 – 25: 2020 ICF Masters Canoe Marathon World in (Norway) Baerum
- August 27 – 30: 2020 ICF Canoe Marathon World in (Norway) Baerum

==== 2020 Canoe Marathon Cup ====
- May 24 – 27:ICF Canoe Marathon World Cup in (Romania) Pitesti

==== 2020 Continental Championship Canoe Marathon Cup ====
- July 23 – 26: 2020 ECA Canoe Marathon European in (Hungary) Budapest

=== Canoe Ocean Racing ===
==== 2020 International Canoe Ocean Racing Worlds ====
- September 5 & 6: in (United States) Nantahala

=== Canoe Polo ===
==== 2020 International Canoe Polo Championships ====
- September 8 – 13: 2020 ICF Canoe Polo World Championship in (Portugal) Viana do Castelo

==== 2020 Continental Championship Canoe Polo ====
- September 24 – 26: 2020 European Clubs Championship Canoe Polo in (France) TBD

==== 2020 Continental Canoe Polo Cup ====
- July 23 – 26: 2020 ECA CUP I Canoe Polo in (Belgium) Mechelen

=== Dragon Boat ===
==== 2020 International Dragon Boat Championships ====
- September 8 – 13: 2020 ICF Dragon Boat World Championship in (India) Bilawali Lake / Indore

=== Wildwater Canoe ===
==== 2020 International Wildwater Canoe Championships ====
- April 26 – 30: 2020 ICF Wildwater Canoe World Championship in (United States) Nantahala

==== 2020 Continental Wildwater Canoe Cup ====
- May 3 – 4: 2020 ICF Wildwater Canoe World Cups 1–2 in (United States) Albright
- May 8 – 8: 2020 ICF Wildwater Canoe World Cups 3–4 in (United States) Albright

== Diving ==
=== 2020 FINA Diving World Cup ===
- April 21 – 26: in (Japan) Tokyo

=== 2020 FINA Diving World Series ===
- February 28 – March 1: DWS #1 in (Canada) Montreal
- March 6 – 8: DWS #2 in (China) Beijing
- March 20 – 22: DWS #3 in (Russia) Kazan
- March 27 – 29: DWS #4 (final) in (United Kingdom) London

=== 2020 FINA Diving Grand Prix ===
- February 14 – 16: DGP #1 in (Spain) Madrid
- February 20 – 23: DGP #2 in (Germany) Rostock
- May 14 – 17: DGP #3 in (Canada) Windsor
- May 28 – 31: DGP #4 in Singapore
- June 5 – 7: DGP #5 in (Malaysia) Kuala Lumpur
- June 17 – 20: DGP #6 in (Egypt) Cairo
- July 3 – 5: DGP #7 in (Italy) Bolzano
- November 6 – 8: DGP #8 (final) in (Australia) Gold Coast

=== 2020 FINA Diving Grand Prix ===
- November 29 – December 6: in (Ukraine) Kyiv

== High diving ==
=== FINA High Diving World Cup 2020 ===
- July 11 – 12: in (Russia) Kazan

=== 2020 Red Bull Cliff Diving World Series ===
- May 16: in Bali, Indonesia
- June 6: in Tour Saint-Nicolas, La Rochelle, France
- June 27: in Possum Kingdom Lake, Fort Worth, United States
- July 19: in (Italy) Pietro L'Abbate's Terrace, Polignano a Mare, Italia
- August 15: in Oslo, Norway
- September 6: in (Portugal) São Miguel, Vila Franca do Campo, Azores
- September 26: in (Bosnia and Herzegovina) Stari Most, Mostar
- October 7: in Sydney, Australia

== Marathon swimming ==
=== 2020 FINA Marathon Swim World Series ===
- February 15: MSWS #1 in (Qatar) Doha
- May 3: MSWS #2 in (Seychelles) Victoria
- June 6: MSWS #3 in (Hungary) Budapest
- June 13: MSWS #4 in (Portugal) Setúbal
- July 23: MSWS #5 in (Canada) Lac Saint-Jean
- August 8: MSWS #6 in (Canada) Lake Mégantic
- August 30: MSWS #7 in (North Macedonia) Ohrid
- September 19: MSWS #8 in (Chinese Taipei) Nantou City
- October 16: MSWS #9 in (China) Hangzhou
- October 25: MSWS #10 (final) in Hong Kong

=== 2020 FINA Ultra Marathon Swim Series ===
- February 15: MSWS #1 in (Argentina) Rosario (TBC)
- February 23: UMSS #1 in (Argentina) Santa Fe
- July 25: UMSS #2 in (Canada) Lac Saint-Jean
- August 22: UMSS #3 in (North Macedonia) Ohrid
- August 29: UMSS #4 in (Croatia) Novi Vinodolski
- September 9: UMSS #5 (final) in (Italy) Capri / Naples

=== FINA Olympic Marathon Swim Qualifier 2020 ===
- May 30–31: in (Japan) Fukuoka

=== FINA World Junior Open Water Swimming Championships 2020 ===
- August 21–23: in (Seychelles) Victoria

== Rowing ==
=== 2020 Summer Olympics (Rowing) ===
- April 2 – 5: 2020 FISA Americas Olympic Qualification Regatta in (Brazil) Rio de Janeiro
- April 27 – 29: 2020 FISA European Olympic Qualification Regatta in (Italy) Varese
- April 27 – 30: 2020 FISA Asia & Oceania Olympic Qualification Regatta in (South Korea) Chungju
- May 17 – 19: 2020 FISA Final Olympic Qualification Regatta in (Switzerland) Lucerne
- July 24 – 31: Rowing at the 2020 Summer Olympics in (Japan) Tokyo

=== 2020 Summer Paralympics (Rowing) ===
- May 8 – 10: 2020 FISA Final Paralympic Qualification Regatta in (Italy) Gavirate
- August 27 – 29: Rowing at the 2020 Summer Paralympics in (Japan) Tokyo

=== International rowing events ===
- January 11: 2020 European Rowing Indoor Championships in (Czech Republic) Prague
- February 7 & 8: 2020 World Rowing Indoor Championships in (France) Paris
- June 5 – 7: 2020 European Rowing Championships in (Poland) Poznań
- August 16 – 23: 2020 World Rowing Championships in (Slovenia) Bled
- August 16 – 23: 2020 World Rowing Junior Championships in (Slovenia) Bled
- August 16 – 23: 2020 World Rowing Under 23 Championships in (Slovenia) Bled
- August 27 – 29: 2020 World University Rowing Championships in (Croatia) Zagreb
- September 2 – 6: 2020 World Rowing Masters Regatta in (Austria) Linz-Ottensheim

=== 2020 World Rowing Cup ===
- April 10 – 12: WRC #1 in (Italy) Sabaudia
- May 1 – 3: WRC #2 in (Italy) Varese
- May 22 – 24: WRC #3 (final) in (Switzerland) Lucerne

== Sailing ==
=== International sailing events ===
- June 30 – July 4: 2020 World University Sailing Championships in (Italy) Campione del Garda
- November 8, 2020 – TBA for 2021: 2020–21 Vendée Globe
- TBA: 2020 Youth Sailing World Championships (location TBA)
- TBA: 2020 Youth Match Racing World Championships (location TBA)
- TBA: 2020 Women's Match Racing World Championship (location TBA)
- TBA: 2020 Transat Québec–Saint-Malo

=== 2020 Sailing World Cup ===
- August 25 – September 1, 2019: SWC #1 in (Japan) Enoshima
- January 19 – 26: SWC #2 in (United States) Miami
- April 13 – 19: SWC #3 in (Italy) Genoa
- June 14 – 21: SWC #4 (final) in (Japan) Enoshima

=== 470 ===
- January 8 – 12: 2020 470 North American Championship in (United States) Coconut Grove Sailing Club (Miami)
- January 12 – 18: 2020 470 African Championship in (Angola) Clube Náutico da Ilha de Luanda
- February 11 – 17: 2020 470 South American Championship (location TBA)
- March 13 – 21: 2020 470 World Championships in (Spain) Club Nàutic S'Arenal (Mallorca)
- May 2 – 9: 2020 470 European Championships in (France) Base Nautique Municipale (Hyères)
- July 12 – 19: 2020 470 Junior World Championships in (Poland) Gdynia Marina
- August 2 – 9: 2020 470 Junior European Championship in (Germany) Warnemünder Segel-Club (Warnemünde)
- August 4 – 9: 2020 470 Masters Cup in (Germany) Warnemünde

=== 49er ===
- January 30 – February 3: 2020 49er Oceania Championship in (Australia) Geelong
- February 9 – 15: 2020 49er & 49er FX World Championships in (Australia) Geelong
- August 18 – 24: 2020 49er Junior (U23) World Championship in (Italy) Lake Como
- August 27 – 29: 2020 49er Masters World Championship in (Italy) Lake Como

=== Finn ===
- May 9 – 16: 2020 Finn Gold Cup in (Spain) Palma de Mallorca (Trofeo Princesa Sofía)
- TBA for August: 2020 Finn Silver Cup in (Poland) Gdynia
- TBA for September: 2020 Finn European Masters in (Poland) Gdynia
- TBA for September: 2020 Finn European Championship in (Poland) Gdynia
- TBA: 2020 Finn World Masters in (Netherlands) Port Zeeland

=== Laser ===
- February 9 – 16: 2020 ILCA Laser Standard Men's World Championship in (Australia) Melbourne
- February 21 – 28: 2020 Laser Radial World Championship for Men and Women in (Australia) Melbourne
- March 19 – 28: 2020 ILCA Laser Masters World Championships in (Australia) Geelong
- July 17 – 24: 2020 ILCA Under-21 World Championships in (Italy) Malcesine
- July 26 – August 3: 2020 ILCA 4.7 Youth World Championships in (Italy) Arco
- August 22 – 30: 2020 ILCA Radial Youth World Championships in (Poland) Dziwnów

=== Nacra 17 ===
- January 30 – February 3: 2020 Nacra 17 Oceania Championship in (Australia) Geelong
- February 9 – 16: 2020 Nacra 17 World Championship in (Australia) Geelong
- August 18 – 24: 2020 Nacra 17 Junior (U23) World Championship in (Italy) Lake Como

=== RS:X ===
- February 9 – 15: 2020 RS:X Windsurfing South American Championships (Olympic Qualifier) in (Argentina) Mar del Plata
- February 23 – 29: 2020 RS:X Windsurfing World Championships in (New Zealand) Auckland
- March 15 – 22: 2020 RS:X Windsurfing Asian Championships (Olympic Qualifier) in (United Arab Emirates) Abu Dhabi
- May 10 – 16: 2020 RS:X European & Youth European Championships and Open Trophy in (Greece) Aigio
- August 23 – 29: 2020 RS:X Windsurfing Youth World Championships in (Spain) Cádiz

== Surfing ==
=== Australian Grand Slam of Surfing ===
- Tweed Coast Pro
- Boost Mobile Pro Gold Coast
- Margaret River Pro

=== International competitions ===
- March 11 – 15: 2020 ISA World Para Surfing Championship in (United States) La Jolla, California
- TBA: 2020 ISA World Junior Surfing Championship
- TBA: 2020 ISA World SUP and Paddleboard Championship
- TBA: 2020 ISA World Longboard Surfing Championship

== Swimming ==
=== 2020 FINA Champions Swim Series ===
- January 14 & 15: CSS #1 in (China) Shenzhen
- January 18 & 19: CSS #2 (final) in (China) Beijing

=== 2020 FINA Swimming World Cup ===
- September 4 – 6: SWC #1 in Singapore (TBC)
- September 10 – 12: SWC #2 in (China) Jinan
- October 2 – 4: SWC #3 in (Russia) Kazan
- October 8 – 10: SWC #4 in (Qatar) Doha
- October 23 – 25: SWC #5 in (Germany) Berlin
- October 30 – November 1: SWC #6 (final) in (Hungary) Budapest

=== 2020–21 International Swimming League ===
- September – April, 2021: 2020–21 ISL regular season (locations TBA)

== Water polo ==
=== 2020 Summer Olympics (Water polo) ===
- March 22 – 29: 2020 Men's Water Polo Olympic Games Qualification Tournament in (Netherlands) Rotterdam

=== 2020 FINA Men's Water Polo World League ===
- October 17, 2019 – April 28, 2020: 2019–20 FINA Men's European Water Polo Preliminary Rounds
- April 28 – May 3: 2020 FINA Men's Intercontinental Water Polo Tournament in the (United States) Indianapolis
- June 23 – 28: 2020 FINA Men's Water Polo World League Superfinal (location TBA)

=== 2020 FINA Women's Water Polo World League ===
- November 19, 2019 – April 28, 2020: 2019–20 FINA Women's European Water Polo Preliminary Rounds
- April 28 – May 3: 2020 FINA Women's Intercontinental Water Polo Tournament in the (United States) Indianapolis
- June 9 – 14: 2020 FINA Women's Water Polo League Superfinal (location TBA)

=== FINA World Water Polo events ===
- July 5 – 12: 2020 FINA World U16 Water Polo Cup in (Greece) Volos-Larissa
- August 22 – 30: 2020 FINA World Men's Youth Water Polo Championships in Turkey (location TBA)
- September 5 – 13: 2020 FINA World Women's Youth Water Polo Championships in (Israel) Netanya

=== Ligue Européenne de Natation (Water polo) ===
- January 12 – 26: 2020 European Water Polo Championship for Men & Women in (Hungary) Budapest
- August 23 – 30: 2020 LEN European Women's U19 Water Polo Championship in (Italy) Rome
- September 6 – 13: 2020 LEN European Men's U19 Water Polo Championship in (Greece) Volos

=== LEN Club events ===
- August 30, 2019 – June 7, 2020: 2019–20 LEN Champions League
- September 13, 2019 – May 9, 2020: 2019–20 LEN Euro Cup
- October 31, 2019 – April 25, 2020: 2019–20 LEN Euro League Women
- TBA: 2020 LEN Super Cup
- TBA: 2019–20 Women's LEN Trophy
- TBA: 2020 Women's LEN Super Cup

== Water skiing & Wakeboarding ==
=== IWWF World Championships ===
- March 21 & 22: 2020 IWWF World Waterski Show Tournament in (Australia) Mulwala
- April 11 – 18: 2020 IWWF World Barefoot Waterski Championships in (Australia) Liverpool (Sydney)
- August 18 – 23: 2020 IWWF World Junior Waterski Championships in (United States) Santa Rosa Beach, Florida
- September 14 – 20: 2020 IWWF World Cable Wakeboard Championships in (Thailand) Pathum Thani
- September 14 – 20: 2020 IWWF World Over 35 Waterski Championships in (France) Baurech
- September 22 – 27: 2020 FISU World University Waterski & Wakeboard Championships in (Ukraine) Dnipro

=== IWWF Continental Championships ===
- August 4 – 8: 2020 IWWF Europe and Africa Youth Waterski Championships in (Spain) Seseña
- August 23 – 30: 2020 IWWF Europe and Africa Waterski Racing Championships in (Belgium) Beringen (to be confirmed)
- August 27 – 30: 2020 IWWF Europe and Africa 35+ Waterski Championships in (Italy) Ravenna
- September 1 – 6: 2020 IWWF Asian Waterski & Wakesports Championships in (South Korea) Chuncheon
- September 2 – 6: 2020 IWWF Europe & Africa Cable Wakeboard and Wakeskate Championships in (Germany) Beckum

=== IWWF World Cup/Elite events ===
- June 5 – 7: 2020 MasterCraft TBD in (United States) Zachary, Louisiana
- June 12 & 13: 2020 Malibu Open in (United States) Charleston, South Carolina
- June 26 – 28: 2020 BOTASKI Pro Am in (Spain) Seseña
- July 3 – 5: 2020 VII San Gervasio Pro Am in (Italy) San Gervasio Bresciano
- July 10 – 12: 2020 Kaiafas Battle Pro Am in (Greece) Kaiafas Lake
- August 15 & 16: 2020 Hilltop Lake ProAm by Syndicate Waterskis in (United States) Arlington, Washington

== See also ==
- 2020 in swimming
- 2020 in sports
