= MYBYK =

Bicycle-sharing and rental service (e. 2014)

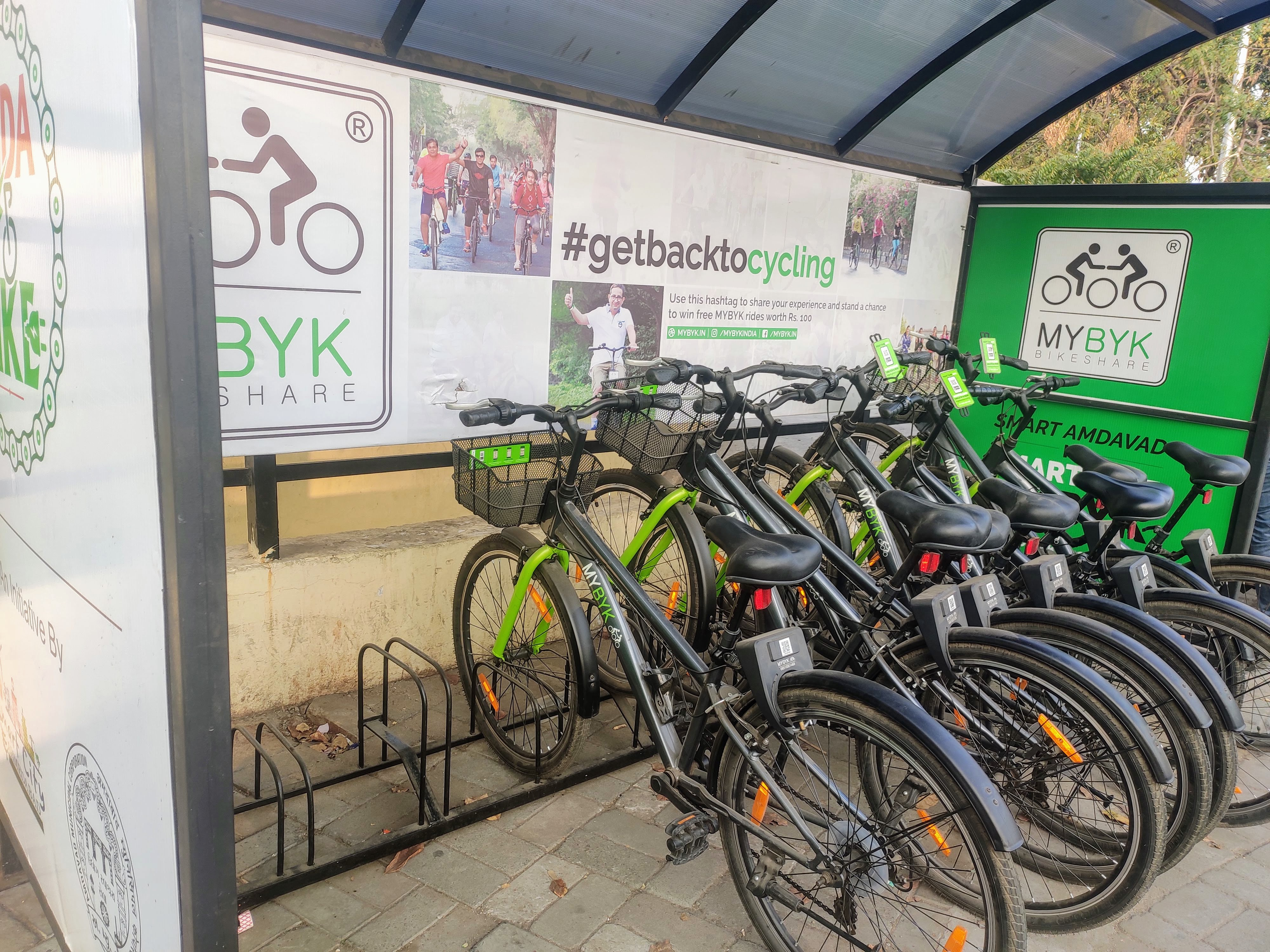
- MYBYK Station at Kankaria Lake BRTS

Overview
- Area served: India
- Locale: Ahmedabad, Udaipur, Jamnagar, Indore
- Transit type: Bicycle-sharing system
- Website: mybyk.in

Operation
- Began operation: May 2014; 12 years ago
- Number of vehicles: 5,500

MYBYK is a public bicycle-sharing system in India.

== History ==
MYBYK was founded in Ahmedabad, Gujarat, in May 2014 by Arjit Soni. Supported by private sector funds and the Amdavad Municipal Corporation, the project started with 200 bicycles and four stations, in conjunction with the Ahmedabad Bus Rapid Transit System (BRTS). The bicycle stations are located at BRTS stations, which allow public transport users to access bicycles from BRTS stations to reach their homes and offices.

MYBYK expanded its service to Jamnagar, Mumbai, and Udaipur, operating with 5,500 cycles. In 2022, MYBYK launched services in Nagpur in association with Nagpur Metro, establishing hubs at metro stations to provide last-mile connectivity. Around the same time, the company expanded to Indore, the largest city in central India, in partnership with Atal Indore City Transport Service Limited with 1,000 cycles. A plan to increase the number of cycles by 3,000 was also approved.

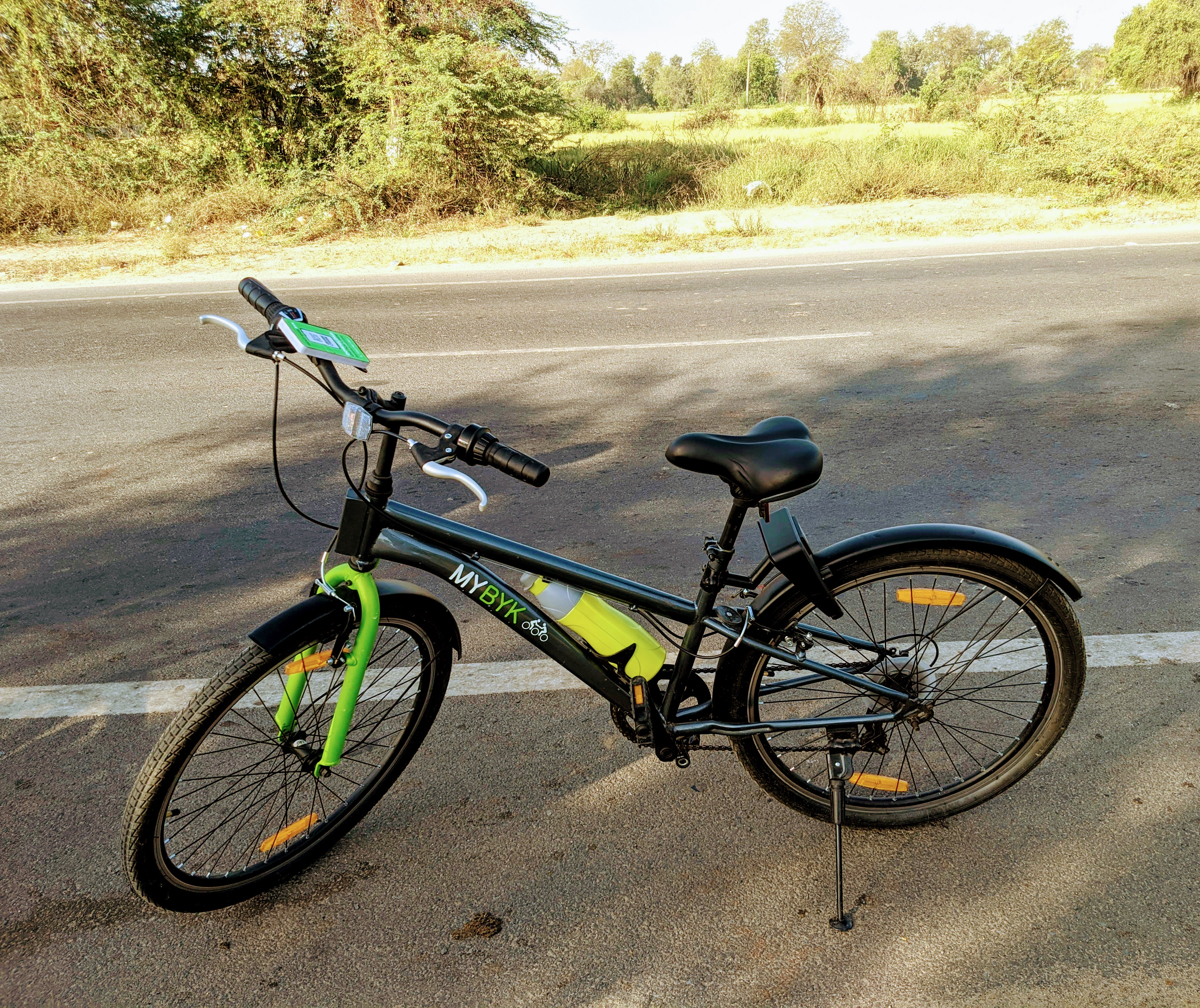
Mybyk in Ahmedabad, 2020

In 2023, the company introduced electric bicycles as part of its fleet. In 2024, MYBYK launched 10-minute free rides plan to mark its 10th anniversary on World Bicycle Day.

== App ==
MYBYK bicycles can be rented through a mobile app.

Reliance Industries Limited, Indian Space Research Organisation (ISRO), Baxter, TATA, Oil and Natural Gas Corporation (ONGC), Suzuki Motors Gujarat, SRF Chemicals Ltd., Wonder Cement, and Adani Shantigram Township are B2B clients of MYBYK.

== See also ==
- List of bicycle-sharing systems
