= Malviya Nagar =

Malviya Nagar is the name of a number of residential colonies mainly in some metro cities India which are named after Madan Mohan Malaviya:

- Malviya Nagar (Bathinda)
- Malviya Nagar (Allahabad)
- Malviya Nagar (Delhi)
  - Malviya Nagar metro station
- Malviya Nagar (Bhopal)
- Malviya Nagar (Indore)
- Malviya Nagar (Lucknow)
- Malviya Nagar (Jaipur)

== See also ==
- Malviya Nagar Assembly constituency (disambiguation)
