= Sukhliya, Indore =

Sukhliya
- Suburb
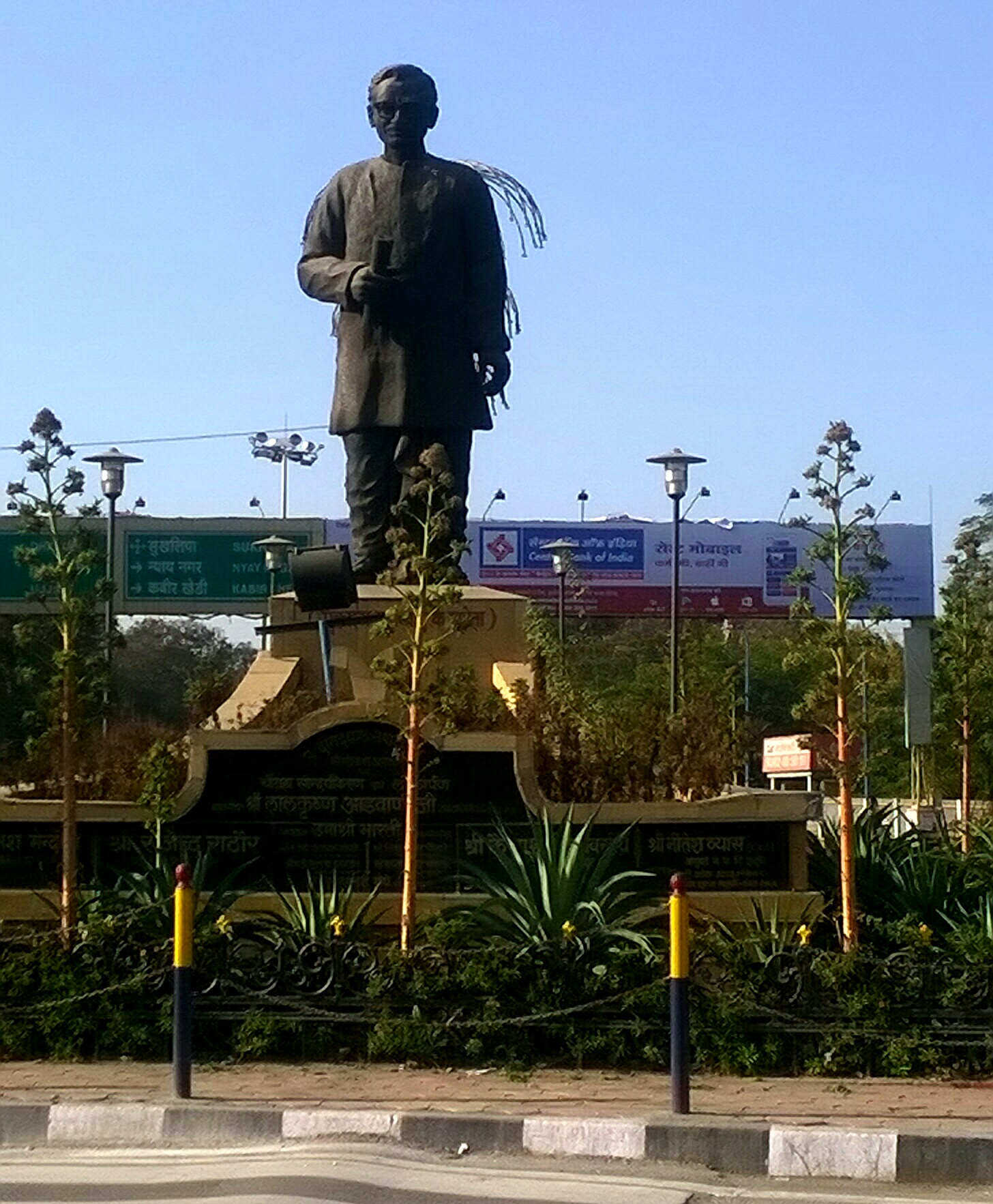
- Pt. Deendayal Upadhyay statue at Pt. Deendayal Upadhyay Square (Bapat Square), Sukhliya, Indore

- Location in Madhya Pradesh, India
- Coordinates: 22.760°N 75.863°E
- Country: India
- State: Madhya Pradesh
- District: Indore

Government
  - Body: Indore Development Authority

Languages
  - Official: Hindi
- Time zone: UTC+5:30 (IST)
- PIN: 452010
- Telephone code: 0731
- Vehicle registration: MP 09
- City: Indore
- Lok Sabha constituency: Indore
- Civic agency: Indore Development Authority

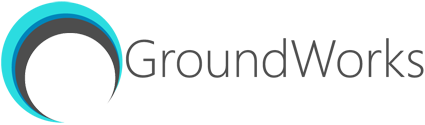
Dinclix GroundWorks is headquartered in Sukhliya

Sukhliya (formerly known as Sukhliya Gram or Gram Sukhliya), is a residential and commercial suburb located in the city of Indore, Madhya Pradesh. Situated next to Mangaliya (MR10 Road as well) and before Vijay Nagar.

Postal Code: 452010

Sukhliya was a rural region before 1990s. It was developed by the Indore Municipal Corporation and the Indore Development Authority as a suburb. With major roads such as MR10, Airport Road, Indore-Ujjain Road passing through Sukhliya, it grew as a commercial as well as residential locality.

== Colonies and Societies ==
Sukhliya consists of following colonies/societies: (In decreasing order of population)

- Heera/Hira Nagar
- Nyay Nagar
- Sunder Nagar Main
- Pandit Deendayal Upadhyay Nagar
- Shyam Nagar
- Shyam Nagar-NX (Extension)
- CM-I, II, III
- Kabir Khedi
- Swasthya Nagar
- Sanskriti Nagar/Ma-Sharda Nagar
- Royal Bungalow City
- Shalimar Bungalow Park
- Maruti Nagar
- Veena Nagar
- Gauri Nagar
- Prime City
- DDU (Dindayal Upadhyay Nagar

All cases/legalities within the locality of Sukhliya comes under Heera/Hira Nagar Thana (Heera Nagar Police Station), Heera Nagar, Sukhliya.

== Nearby Suburbs ==
- Vijay Nagar
- Mangaliya
- Scheme Numbers 78, 74, 54
- Patnipura/Pardeshipura
