= Indore Monorail =

Proposed monorail system in Indore, India

Overview
- Owner: Indore Municipal Corporation
- Locale: Indore, Madhya Pradesh, India
- Transit type: Straddle-beam monorail

The Indore Monorail was a proposed monorail-based rapid transit system for the city of Indore, Madhya Pradesh, India. In 2011, the state government initiated a feasibility study with assistance from the Delhi Metro Rail Corporation. The estimated construction cost was ₹125–150 crore per kilometre, and the Indore Municipal Corporation and Indore Development Authority (IDA) consulted Larsen & Toubro (L&T) to conceptualise the network.

The monorail proposal was subsequently superseded by conventional metro rail technology, with construction beginning in 2021 on the first line of the Indore Metro.

== See also ==
- Indore Metro
- Monorail in India
