= Waibhav Anil Kale =

Indian Army officer (1978–2024)

Colonel Waibhav Anil Kale
- Born: 1978; Nagpur, India
- Died: 13 May 2024 (aged 45–46)
- Education: Jawaharlal Nehru University (BA); Devi Ahilya Vishwavidyalaya (Diploma)

Colonel Waibhav Anil Kale (1978–2024) was a retired Indian Army officer who had served over two decades in the armed forces. He was working with the United Nations (UN) as a security service coordinator when he was killed after the vehicle he was traveling in came under attack in Gaza's Rafah region by the IDF.

== Early life ==
Born in Nagpur, he completed his schooling at Somalwar High School. For his higher education, he pursued a BA degree in humanities from Jawaharlal Nehru University and obtained a Diploma in Senior Defense Management from Devi Ahilya Vishwavidyalaya, Indore.

== Life and death ==
He has commanded the 11 JAK Rifles in Kashmir, and has served as an instructor at the army's Infantry School in Mhow. He has also operated in the northeast and the Siachen glacier, and actively engaged in counterintelligence and counterterrorism operations. His death marked the UN's first international casualty since the Israel-Hamas conflict began last year. He is survived by his wife Amruta and two children.

The UN and India have both called for investigations into the incident. The Ministry of External Affairs of India has extended all assistance to bring his mortal remains back to India.
