= School of Chemical Science (Indore, India) =

Chemistry and technical school

School of Chemical Sciences
- Other name: SOCHEM
- Type: Autonomous
- Established: 1972
- Director: Dr. R. Prasad
- Faculty: 8
- Location: Indore, Madhya Pradesh, India
- Campus: Urban
- Website: www.chemical.dauniv.ac.in

The School of Chemical Science or 'SOCHEM' is a Chemistry and Technical education school in Indore, India. SOCHEM is a University Teaching Department of Devi Ahilya University. The institute is situated in the Takshila Campus of Devi Ahilya University. It was founded in 1972.

The institution provides post graduate and Ph.D. level courses in its campus.

== History ==
The School of Chemistry (now School of Chemical Sciences) established in 1972, is one of the Schools of Devi Ahilya University Indore. The School was founded with the services of Prof. W. V. Bhagwat, along with Later Prof. M. B. Antia, Late Prof. R. Kaushal and Prof. S. G. Harmalkar. Subsequently, many members became the faculty of this school. Ever since its international status. It is the only School of the State which was honoured two times with the prestigious Katju award (Prof. N. S. Poonia for the year 1983 and Prof. K. K. Pandey for the year 1990).

== Courses ==
Admissions are carried out on an All-India basis and the students are drawn from different parts of the country.

To prepare trained Chemist Scientists for positions in drug and pharmaceutical industries and environmental organizations, School is running many courses in pharmaceutical sciences.

M. Sc. (Pharmaceutical Chemistry)
M. Sc. (Applied Chemistry)
M. Sc. (Chemistry)

== Admissions ==
Admission in M.Sc. through Departmental Entrance Test conducted by Department itself followed by personal interview. M.Sc. (Chemistry, Applied Chemistry and Pharmaceutical Chemistry)

- Total number of seats for each course: 20
- Course duration: Four Semesters (two years)
- Reservation for various categories will be as per Government Rules.
- Basic qualification: B.Sc. with 65% marks and Chemistry as one of the subjects.
- Admission of candidate with less than 50% marks will not be considered.

Admission in PhD is through DET conducted by Department. Relaxation to those candidates who have qualified NET or GATE examination followed by personal interview.

== Summer training and project work ==
Summer training and project work in industries such as Ranbaxy, Glaxo, Lupin, Sarabhai Chemicals, Piramal Enterprises, IPCA, Dr. Reddy's Lab., Kirloskar Brothers, Cyno Pharma, Parke-Davis, Bridgestone and national institutes such as National Institute of Immunology, New Delhi, NCL, Pune, NIPER, Chandigarh, CDRI, Lucknow, IICT, Hyderabad, NEERI, Nagpur, RRL, Bhopal, National Research Centre for Soybean, Indore, Indian Institute of Petroleum, Dehradun, Central Food Technological Research Institute, Mysore, CAT, Indore, Inter University Consortium, Indore Centre, DMRL, Hyderabad, IISc, Bangalore.
