= Maharaja Ranjit Singh College of Professional Sciences =

College in Madhya Pradesh, India

Coordinates: 22.6787°N 75.8810°E

Maharaja Ranjit Singh College of Professional Sciences, Indore
- Other names: MRSC
- Motto: शुभ करमन ते कबहुँ ना टरौ
- Type: Private
- Established: 1994
- Affiliations: UGC, Devi Ahilya Vishvavidyalaya, RGPV, AICTE
- Officer in charge: Satvinder Singh Makhija
- Principal: Anand Nighojkar
- Location: Indore, Madhya Pradesh, India
- Campus: 10 acres (4.0 ha)
- Website: www.mrscindore.org

Maharaja Ranjit Singh College of Professional Sciences is a professional college established in 1994 in Madhya Pradesh. It is located on Khandwa Road, Indore near the Institute of Engineering and Technology, a wing of the Devi Ahilya Vishwavidyalaya.

It is founded by the Indo Friends Foundation Trust, Indore, a voluntary, non-profit foundation registered with the Government of Madhya Pradesh.

== Academics ==
Research The college is recognized in 2(f) and 12(B) by UGC, MPCST and MPBTC have funded several research projects to the Department of Life Science, Division of Plant Tissue Culture of the college. It is accredited by NAAC as A grade.

Industrial Trainings and Industrial Visits Regular industrial visits are conducted for various companies e.g. Parle-G, Ruchi Soya, Symbiotec, Indore Biotech, Syncom Healthcare, Piramal, PDPL, etc.

== Sister Institutions ==
Mata Gujri Girls Public School, Indore; Mata Gujri College of Professional Studies, Indore; Guru Harkrishan Public School, Indore; Kids World International Pre-School;

== Library ==
The library has more than 30,000 books, magazines, CDs and journals.

== Hostels ==
College has separate hostels for girls and boys on campus with facilities like mess, gym and recreation rooms apart from an indoor games facility.
