= Atal Bihari Vajpayee Regional Park =

Park in Indore, India

Coordinates: 22.677°N 75.856°E

- Interactive map of Atal Bihari Vajpayee Regional Park
- Type: Public park
- Location: Indore, Madhya Pradesh, India
- Area: 80 acres (32 ha)
- Created: Indore Development Authority
- Operator: Indore Development Authority
- Status: open
- Website: Official Website

Regional Park Indore (officially Atal Bihari Vajpayee Regional Park) is a park located in Indore, Madhya Pradesh. The park was developed and created by Indore Development Authority and was opened in 2003. Park is located on 80 acres of land with 42 acres for lake and other 38 for other attractions. Park is named after former Prime Minister of India Atal Bihari Vajpayee. There is also a canal, which covers the whole park starting from one point of the pond and ending at the other part. The bridges over canal with the mist fountain make one feel a special type of peace, mentally as well as physically.

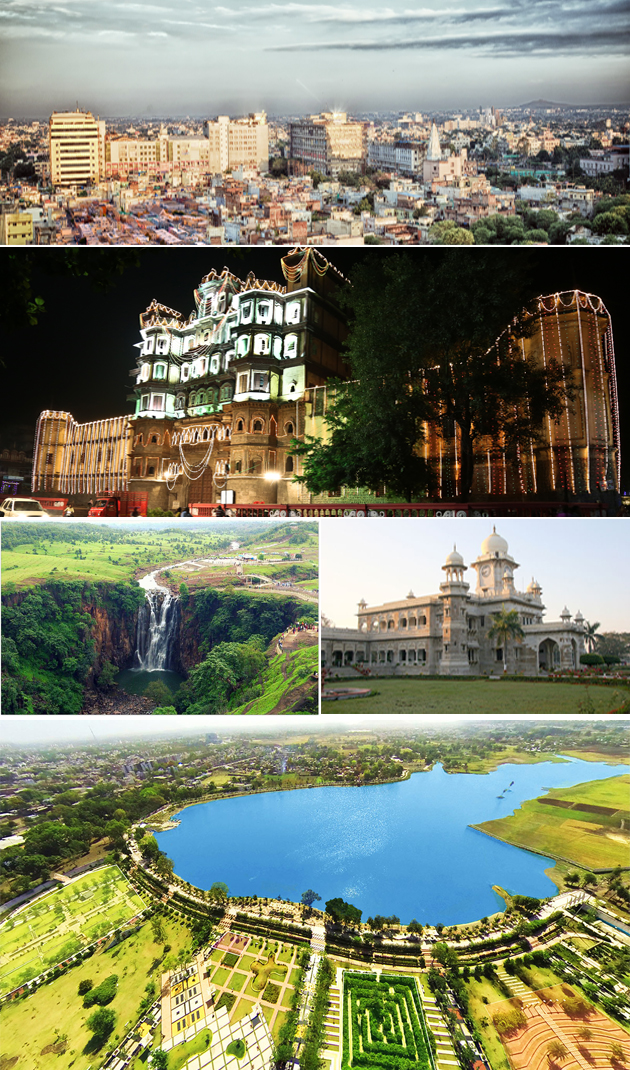
Regional Park (Aerial View)

There are various exciting paddle boats (pedalos), speedboats (or motorboats/powerboats), and even small cruisers. The ride charges for these boats vary from each other. The latest attraction to the Regional park is the mini cruiser Malwa Queen that has been added here, and is the first in the state. It has two decks, accommodating around 80 people, and has a restaurant and private party rooms.

== Attractions ==
- Amphitheatre
- Artists' village
- Bio-diversity garden
- Boating
- Fast food zone
- French gardens
- Jumping jet fountain
- Lake-view Point
- Malwa Queen - Only mini cruise restaurant in the state with capacity for 80 persons.
- Mist fountain
- Musical Fountain
