= Malviya Nagar Assembly constituency =

Malviya Nagar Assembly constituency may refer to either of these electoral constituencies in India:

- Malviya Nagar, Delhi Assembly constituency
- Malviya Nagar, Rajasthan Assembly constituency

== See also ==
- Malviya Nagar (disambiguation)
