= Takshashila Campus =

Takshashila Campus is one of the two campuses of Devi Ahilya University, Indore (the other being Nalanda Campus). While Nalanda Campus hosts the administrative offices of the university, Takshashila Campus was created to provide space for more departments.

== Infrastructure ==
The campus sprawls over a 200 acres. Separated by a National Highway, it is further divided into three portions. On one of these portions School of Pharmacy, DAVV is built, while the other has the Institute of Engineering Technology. The major portion has about 28 departments of the university.

The Takshashila Campus hosts the following departments/institutes/schools:

- Academic Staff College
- Center of Potential of Excellence in e-Management studies
- Department of Life Long Learning
- Educational Multimedia Research Centre
- Institute of Management Studies
- International Institute of Professional Studies
- Institute of Engineering and Technology
1. Department of Computer Engineering
2. Department of Information Technology
3. Electronics and Telecommunication/Instrumentation Department
4. Applied Science Department
5. Mechanical Engineering
- School of Biotechnology
- School of Biochemistry
- School of Chemical Sciences
- School of Commerce
- School of Computer Science & Information Technology and Computer Centre
- School of Economics
- School of Education
- School of Electronics
- School of Energy and Environmental Studies
- School of Future Studies and Planning
- School of Instrumentation
- School of Journalism & Mass Communication
- School of Law
- School of Library Sciences
- School of Life Sciences
- School of Mathematics
- School of Pharmacy
- School of Physical Education
- School of Physics
- School of Social Sciences
- School of Statistics
- University Central Library
- University Cultural Center

It also hosts facilities like

- Central Auditorium
- Central Library
- University IT Center
- University Health Center
- Indian Coffee House (privately run by ICWS Jabalpur)
- University Post office
- Jawaharlal Nehru Boys Hostel

The campus has extensions that host hostel facilities for students and guests.
