= Maharaja Yeshwantrao Hospital =

Maharaja Yashwantrao Hospital

Geography
- Location: A. B. Road, Indore, Madhya Pradesh, India
- Coordinates: 22°42′48″N 75°52′48″E

Organisation
- Type: Teaching, Tertiary Centre

Services
- Beds: 3000 (M Y Group of Hospitals) Proposed 4700 beds (New M Y Hospital with 1700 beds sanctioned in 2025)

History
- Founded: 1955

Links
- Lists: Hospitals in India

The Maharaja Yeshwantrao Hospital, also known as Maharaja Yashwant Rao Hospital or simply M. Y. Hospital, is a government hospital located in the heart of city of Indore, India.It is the tertiary teaching hospital of one of the oldest and premier government medical colleges in India, Mahatma Gandhi Memorial Medical College, Indore(MGM Medical College, Indore)

== Facilities ==
M. Y. Hospital has 1300 beds with all the major medical departments: surgery, medicine, obstetrics & gynaecology, dermatology, chest&tb, orthopaedics, E.N.T., ophthalmology, radiology, anaesthesiology, paediatrics, forensic medicine, and casualty and superspeciality departments. Hospital has 25 bedded medical intensive care unit, 15 hemodialysis machine, endoscopy unit, ventilators etc. There are SICU, NICU, PICU, burns units and surgical superspeciality units in M Y hospital. This seven storied government hospital is surrounded by a group of 6 hospitals in MYH campus namely 200 bedded Chacha Nehru Children's hospitals, 100 bedded M.R. TB hospital, 100 bedded cancer hospital,600 bedded Superspeciality hospital and 500 bedded MTH Women's hospital & School of Excellence for Eye. The old KEM school built in 1878 is on this campus & it is planned to convert into a medical museum. It also has a 100 bedded mental hospital associated with it which is located in Badganga, Indore. The total number of beds in the hospitals associated with MGM Medical College at present is about 3000.

New M Y Hospital with 1700 beds has been sanctioned by Government of Madhya Pradesh in 2025 for 700 crores rupees to be built in the same campus near New OPD building complex within shortest time span and existing old MY Hospital built in 1955 with 1250 beds will continue to cater public & patients from Indore, Ujjain regions & neighbouring states.

== History ==
Indore was once the centre of health care in western India. Central India's first medical institution, King Edward Medical School was established here as early as in 1878 & Indore charitable hospital was started in the year 1847. The hospital is named after Yashwantrao Holkar II , Maharaja of Indore, the last Holkar ruler who had envisioned & donated land and money to build such a big hospital in Indore those days. The blueprint for this hospital was made in 1937, but the construction was postponed till 1946 due to World War 2. When it was inaugurated in 1955, it was Asia's largest government hospital with 700 beds & largest government hospital till date in central India. It is the first government hospital to be computerised in Central India. M Y Hospital has footfalls of over 5000 outpatients daily and present M Y hospital is over 77 years old building structure hence the public need of a new hospital was raised & Government of Madhya Pradesh has approved the bill & sanctioned 750 crores in 2025 for the construction of new 1700 bedded hospital & old MY Hospital will continue to function.
