= Dewas Naka =

- Suburb
- Location in Madhya Pradesh, India Dewas Naka (India)
- Coordinates: 22.42°N 75.54°E
- Country: India
- State: Madhya Pradesh
- District: Indore District
- City: Indore

Government
  - Type: Municipal Corporation
  - Body: Indore Municipal Corporation (IMC)
  - Mayor: Malini Laxmansingh Gaur
  - District Collector: Manish Singh, IAS

Population (2010)
  - Total: 8,250

Languages
  - Official: Hindi
- Time zone: UTC+5:30 (IST)
- PIN: 452001
- Vehicle registration: MP-09
- Lok Sabha constituency: Indore
- Vidhan Sabha constituency: Indore-2
- Website: imcindore.mp.gov.in

Dewas Naka is a suburb residential locality in the city of Indore, Madhya Pradesh, India. It got its name from a major industrial-town of Madhya Pradesh Dewas as it is the last suburb before the main Highway starts. Elected Member of the Legislative Assembly is Ramesh Mendola.

== Geography ==
Dewas Naka is home to the new Iron Market (Loha Mandi) and a slew of industries. It also has various automobile and oil related industrial shops and industries.
Neighbouring suburbs: Talawali Chanda, Lasudia Mori, Vijay Nagar, Manglaya Sadak
Arterial Roads: Agra-Bombay Road (NH 52)

== Politics ==
Bhanwarkuan area falls under the Indore-2 Assembly Constituency in Indore District. The current elected Member is Ramesh Mendola from the BJP.

== Transport ==
The nearest railway station is Manglia Gaon railway station. However, it is just a basic station. The Indore Junction railway station is the main junction to catch trains. Public transport such as autos, taxis, magic-vans, city buses are readily available.

Dewas Naka being located on the arterial A.B. Road (Agra–Bombay Road NH 52), several City Bus routes serve the area, with fares ranging from ₹10.00 to ₹25.00 or even more depending on distance. Bus Routes passing by main Niranjanpur Square are

S. No.	Route No.	Start	End
1	iBus	Rajiv Gandhi Circle	Dewas Naka
2	26	Railway Station	Kshipra
3	17	Railway Station	Manglia Toll Naka
4	18A	Rajwada Circle	Dewas Naka

== Places of interest ==
- Lasudia Lake
- APJ Abdul Kalam University: a private university
- TATA IoN Centre
