= Shree Geeta Bhawan =

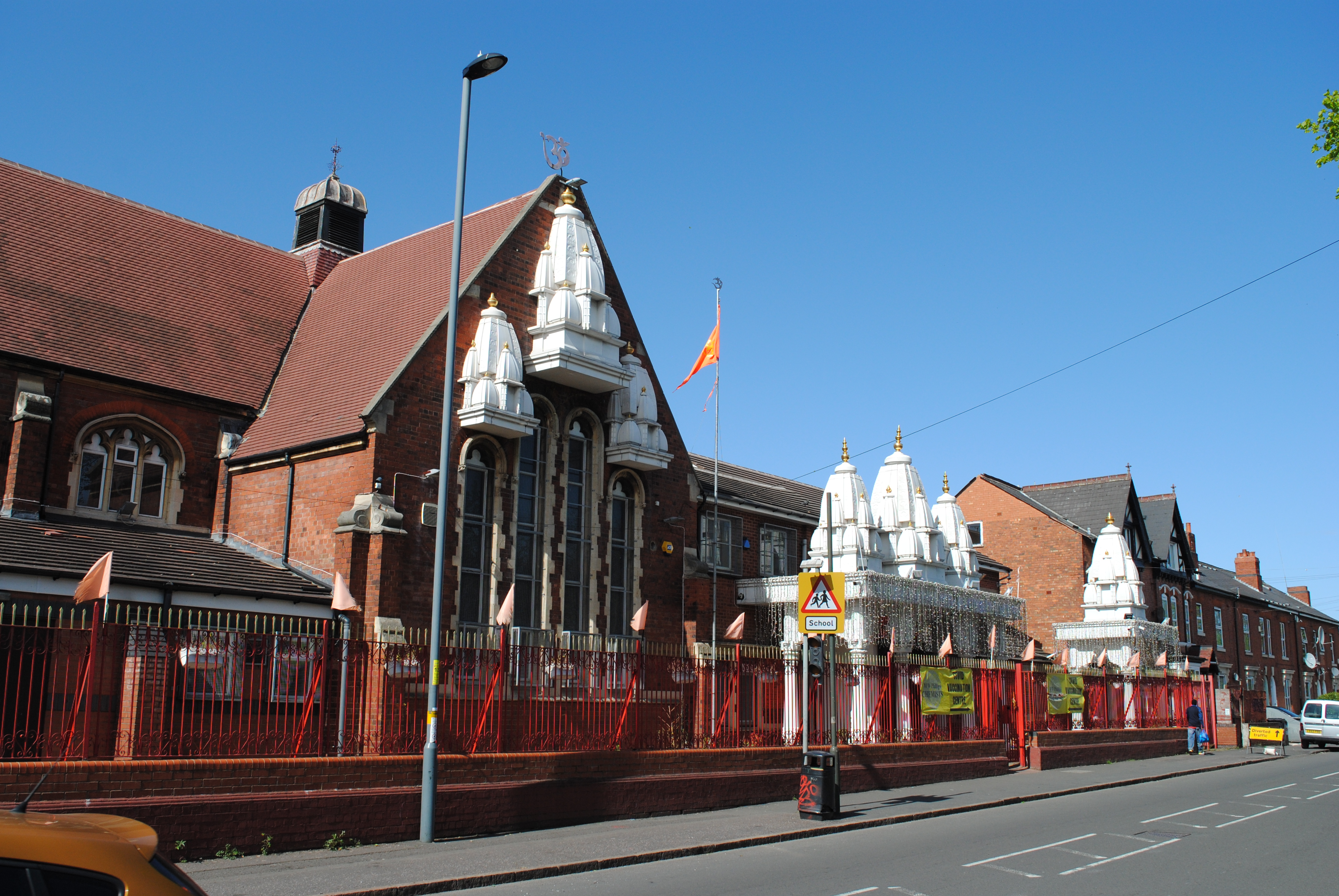
- The temple in April 2022

Religion
- Affiliation: Hinduism
- District: Handsworth, Birmingham

Location
- Location: 107-117 Heathfield Road
- Country: England
- Geographic coordinates: 52.50570°N 1.91108°W

Architecture
- Date established: 1986

Website
- www.shreegeetabhawan.com

The Shree Geeta Bhawan Mandir (grid reference SP061897) is the first Hindu temple in the West Midlands of England, opened in a former church in 1969. It is situated at 107-117 Heathfield Road, on the corner of Brecon Road, on the border of the Handsworth and Lozells districts of Birmingham.

Originally, services were held at 32 Hall Road, Birmingham B20 2BQ.

The Mandir has a daily Aarti at 11 am and 7 pm and has weekly Poojas for Balaji on Sunday mornings, and Durga Maa on Tuesday evenings.

== Architecture ==
The building was the former St George's Presbyterian Church and was originally designed by J.P.Osborne in a cruciform shape in 1896.

Pevsner and Wedgwood (1966) said it was "...in a style variously described as 'modern Gothic' and a 'modification of Renaissance'. In fact an ungainly mixture of styles and an odd plan.".
