= Institute of Management Studies, Devi Ahilya University =

Institute of Management Studies
- Type: Autonomous
- Established: 1969
- Director: Sangeeta Jain
- Location: Indore, Madhya Pradesh, India
- Campus: Urban
- Website: www.ims.dauniv.ac.in

Institute of Management Studies (IMS) is the University Teaching Department of Devi Ahilya University, Indore specializing in Management Education. It offers various management courses leading to the degrees Master of Business Administration MBA, Bachelor of Business Administration (BBA) and integrated MBA i.e. (BBA+MBA) in several disciplines, (BBA+MBA)Hospital administration was started as a branch of management studies in India by this institution and holds the record of providing best of the administrator's in the field also IMS was first Institute of the state to start (BBA+MBA) i.e. Integrated MBA in E-commerce. It offers the following branches for Management:

- Hospital Administration (MBA)
- Hospital Administration (Integrated MBA)
- E-commerce (MBA)
- E-commerce (Integrated MBA)
- Financial Administration (MBA)
- Disaster Management (MBA)
- Human Resources (MBA)
- Marketing Management (MBA)
- Full Time (MBA)
- Executive (MBA)
- Ph.D.
- M.Phil.

== History ==
The institute was established in 1969 and was then called the Department of Business Administration. It is the oldest institute of the city that offers an MBA degree. Initially, the organization offered only a 'Distance Education' degree in business administration with a three-year duration. However, the intake capacity was later increased. Today, it has more than 3,000 students of various disciplines studying as full-time or part-time candidates.

== Location ==
The institute is located within the university campus (Takshashila Campus) adjacent to the Education Multimedia Research Center, near the university's School of Law. The Takshashila Campus is at the outer part of Indore near Bhawarkua at Khandwa road.
