= Manglaya Sadak =

Mangaliya Sadak
- Census town
- Location in Madhya Pradesh, India Mangaliya Sadak (India)
- Coordinates: 22°48′56″N 75°55′40″E
- Country: India
- State: Madhya Pradesh
- District: Indore

Population (2001)
  - Total: 5,951

Languages
  - Official: Hindi
- Time zone: UTC+5:30 (IST)
- ISO 3166 code: IN-MP
- Vehicle registration: MP

Mangaliya Sadak is a census town in Indore district in the Indian state of Madhya Pradesh.

== Demographics ==
As of 2001 India census, Manglaya Sadak had a population of 5951. Males constitute 54% of the population and females 46%. Manglaya Sadak has an average literacy rate of 61%, higher than the national average of 59.5%: male literacy is 71%, and female literacy is 50%. In Manglaya Sadak, 15% of the population is under 6 years of age.
