= Malviya Nagar (Madhya Pradesh) =

- suburb
- Country: India
- State: Madhya Pradesh
- District: Indore

Population (2010)
  - Total: 83,210

Languages
  - Official: Hindi
- Time zone: UTC+5:30 (IST)
- PIN: 452008
- Telephone code: 0731
- ISO 3166 code: IN-MP
- Vehicle registration: MP

Malviya Nagar is a residential locality within Indore, Madhya Pradesh, India. Started by the Indore Development Authority, it boomed in population in the late 1990s.

Postal Code: 452008

Elected Member of the Legislative Assembly: Ranjana Shah

== Entertainment ==
Malviya Nagar is known for its popular C 21 Mall which houses more. MEGASTORE, Big Life, Satyam Cineplex etc. There are a number of restaurants in the mall including McDonald's and Domino's.

== Residential sectors ==
The locality consists of six sectors from A to F in which approximately 5000 houses are being occupied the colony.

== Transportation ==
=== Road ===
==== Bus ====
Malviya Nagar has an iBus Station connecting it to other parts of Indore City.
