= Vijay Nagar, Indore =

Vijay Nagar
- Suburb
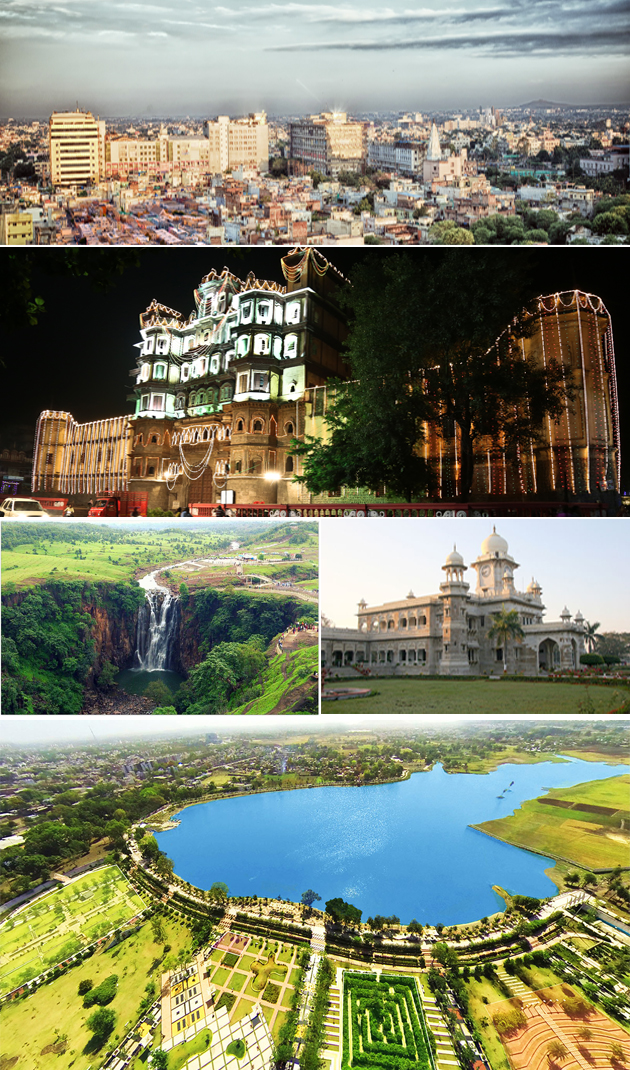
- Vijay Nagar Area
- Interactive map of Vijay Nagar
- Country: India
- State: Madhya Pradesh
- District: Indore

Government
  - Body: Indore Development Authority

Population (2010)
  - Total: 198,000

Languages
  - Official: Hindi
- Time zone: UTC+5:30 (IST)
- PIN: 452010
- Telephone code: 0731
- Vehicle registration: MP 09
- Nearest city: Indore
- Lok Sabha constituency: Indore
- Civic agency: Indore Development Authority

Vijay Nagar is a major residential area in Indore, as a part of Greater Indore. Developed by the Indore Development Authority, the suburb saw a boom in population in the late 1990s. Real estate prices have since shot up and are among the highest in Indore, in part because of the continued influx of immigrants. Vijay Nagar is located in the eastern part of the city and is nestled between MR-9, MR-10, and Eastern Ring Road. Lately, with the development of Indore BRTS, the area has witnessed rampant growth. Today, It has developed as the major commercial hub of Indore.

== Entertainment ==
Vijay Nagar is popular for its malls like the C-21, Malhar Mega Mall, Mangal City and Orbit. There are a number of food chains and cafes in the area. The streets of Vijay Nagar are dotted with shops and high end shopping plazas. Playotel, Hotel Marriott, Hotel Wow and Sayaji, the leading hotels of Indore are in Vijay Nagar as well.

== Society flats ==
The locality consists of IDA Flats and also private residential projects, including Shalimar Township, Shekhar Planet, Nandini Vihar, Suyash Club and BCM Heights

== Nearby Suburbs ==
- Sukhliya/MR10 Region
- Palasia
- Khajrana Temple Area

== Transportation ==
Bus Routes:

004 Panchwati - Vaishali Nagar
005 Arvindo Hospital - Mhow Naka
017 Silver Springs - MR10
