= Mahatma Gandhi Memorial Medical College, Indore =

Medical college in Indore, India

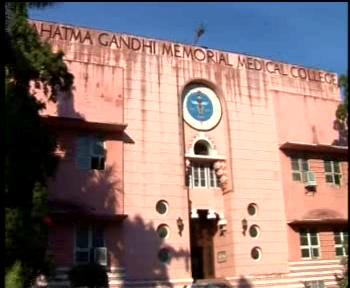
- Other names: MGM Medical College, Indore
- Former name: King Edward Medical School (1848-1947)
- Type: Government medical college and hospital
- Established: 1848; 178 years ago
- Academic affiliations: Madhya Pradesh Medical Science University
- Dean: Dr. Arvind Kumar Ghanghoria
- Undergraduates: 250 per year
- Postgraduates: 289 per year
- Location: Indore, India; 22.714°N 75.883°E
- Website: http://www.mgmmcindore.in/

Mahatma Gandhi Memorial Government Medical College, Indore also known as MGM Medical College, Indore is a public medical college in Indore, India. Previously known as King Edward Medical School, the college was established in 1848. It was one of the earliest medical schools in Asia. It was converted into a medical college in 1948. Its teaching hospital, Maharaja Yeshwantrao Hospital, was established in 1955.

== History ==
Indore Charitable Trust was started in 1848 by British Army troops & Central India's first Medical School was started in 1878 as 'Central Indian Medical School' for imparting medical education for both Britishers & natives. In 1911 it was renamed as King Edward Hospital & Medical School and continued to be the same even after independence in 1947. Later it was rechristened to its present name of Government Mahatma Gandhi Memorial Medical College (MGM Medical College) in the year 1948 in the beloved memory of India's "Father of Nation".It is affiliated with Maharaja Yeshwantrao Hospital & group of hospitals for clinical training.

MBBS degrees were started from 1948 and selection done made through competitive exams.MD and MS degrees were started in the institution way back in 1953. MGM Medical College, Indore, had many pioneers in the field of Pediatrics, General Medicine, Surgery and subspecialities were started as early as in 1950. MGMMC conducted the First All India Pediatrics Conference in 1955. A cardiology division was constructed in 1959 which conducted heart surgeries for poor people. MGM Medical College is one of the founder medical colleges associated with National Medical Library of India and RHD registry under ICMR.

Indore was once the centre of health care in western India. Central India's first medical institution, King Edward Medical School, was established here as early as 1848 and Indore charitable hospital was started early in 1878. The hospital is named after Yashwantrao Holkar, Maharaja of Indore, the last Holkar ruler. When it was inaugurated in 1955, it was Asia's largest government hospital and largest hospital till date in central India.

Admissions are granted through the national NEET Exam. It is the first government hospital to be computerised. Its first dean was Dr. Bose, who was the head of department of pharmacology. Current dean is Dr. Arvind Kumar Ghangoria.

== Departments ==
1. Department of Anaesthesiology
2. Department of Anatomy
3. Department of Biochemistry
4. Department of Cardiology
5. Department of Cardiothoracic Surgery
6. Department of Dental Surgery
7. Department of Dermatology
8. Department of Emergency Medicine
9. Department of Forensic Medicine
10. Department of Gastroenterology
11. Department of General Surgery
12. Department of Medicine
13. Department of Microbiology
14. Department of Nephrology
15. Department of Neurology
16. Department of Neurosurgery
17. Department of Obstetrics and Gynaecology
18. Department of Ophthalmology
19. Department of Orthopaedics
20. Department of Otorhinolaryngology
21. Department of Paediatric Surgery
22. Department of Paediatrics
23. Department of Pathology
24. Department of Pharmacology
25. Department of Physiology
26. Department of Plastic Surgery
27. Department of Psychiatry
28. Department of Radiology
29. Department of Radiotherapy
30. Department of Sexually Transmitted Diseases
31. Department of Community Medicine
32. Department of Tuberculosis and Chest Diseases
33. Department of Urology

Total bed strength of 7 associated hospitals under MGM Medical College is around 3000. M. Y. Hospital has 1300 beds with all the major medical departments: surgery, medicine, obstetrics and gynaecology, dermatology, chest and TB, orthopaedics, E.N.T., ophthalmology, radiology, anaesthesiology, paediatrics, forensic medicine, and casualty, and superspeciality branches. Hospital has 25 bedded MICU, ICCU,30 hemodialysis machines, endoscopy unit. There are SICU, NICU, PICU, burn units, and surgical superspeciality units in M Y Hospital.This hospital gives special privilege to poor under a central government aided scheme.

It holds the reputation of a biggest tertiary care center in Central India and many government health schemes are operated by its social medicine department.

This seven-storied government hospital is surrounded by a group of hospitals in MYH campus: 200-bedded Chacha Nehru Children's hospitals, 100-bedded M.R. TB hospital, 100-bedded cancer hospital, 600 bedded superspeciality hospital, 500 bedded MTH Women's hospital & School of Excellence for Eye. The old KEM school built in 1878 is on this campus & it is planned to convert into a medical museum. It has a 100 bedded psychiatric hospital associated with it which is in Badganga, Indore.

125th anniversary of King Edward Medical School & MGM Medical College, Indore was celebrated in 2003.

New M Y Hospital with 1450 beds has been sanctioned by Government of Madhya Pradesh in 2025 for 750 crores rupees to be built in the same campus near New OPD building complex within shortest time span and existing old MY Hospital built in 1955 with 1250 beds will continue to cater public & patients from Indore, Ujjain regions & neighbouring states.

Currently affiliated hospitals are:

MYH & Super Specialty Hospital

Cancer Hospital

School of Excellence for Eye

Chacha Nehru Hospital

Mental Hospital

MTH Hospital
