= Nexus Indore Central Mall =

- Location: Indore, India
- Coordinates: 22°43′05″N 75°52′17″E
- Address: 170, RNT Marg, Opp. Ravindra Natya Grah, Indore, M.P – 452001
- Opened: 20 June 2009 (as Indore Central)
- Developer: Treasure Group
- Owner: Nexus Select Trust
- Num. of stores: 26
- Num. of anchor tenants: 06
- Floor area: 250,000 sq.ft.
- Floors: 6
- Parking: Multilevel
- Website: https://www.nexusselecttrust.com/nexus-indore-central

Nexus Indore Central Mall (earlier Treasure Island Next, TI Next Mall, Central Mall) is a shopping mall in the city of Indore in India. It was officially opened in June 2009 as Central Mall but it underwent renovations and some parts were re-organised in 2017 and was re-branded and re-launched on 26 February 2018. It is owned by the Nexus Select Trust and they operate 17 malls across 13 cities of India.

== Facilities ==
- H&M opened its first store in Indore here. The largest Central Departmental Store of Central India is also situated in the mall. Recently Pantaloons has also opened here.
- The mall features an INOX multiplex along with its premium offering Insignia.
- Play In, a Trampoline Park is situated at level five.

== See also ==
- The Blackstone Group
