= Bilawali Lake =

Lake in Indore, India

- Location within Madhya Pradesh
- Location: Indore, Madhya Pradesh, India
- Coordinates: 22°38′N 75°50′E
- Primary inflows: Inflow Channel from Limbodi Lake
- Primary outflows: Regulated, one channel towards Chhota Bilawali Lake
- Catchment area: 4 square kilometres (1.5 mi^{2})
- Basin countries: India
- Surface area: 2–2.5 square kilometres (0.77–0.97 mi^{2})
- Average depth: 9.14 metres (30.0 ft)
- Max. depth: 10 m (33 ft)
- Frozen: no
- Islands: One
- Settlements: Indore

Bilawali Lake is located on Indore-Khandwa Road (Indore-Icchapur State Highway) in Indore. The total area of the lake and its surrounding protected region is 400 hectares (around 4 square kilometers) and falls under the jurisdiction of the Indore Municipal Corporation.

== History ==
Bilawali Lake was created by the Holkars of Indore State in the early 20th century. It completed 100 years of existence in 2016. After the independence of India and extinction of the royal houses, religious sites started mushrooming up around the lake and over the years it was encroached upon by the people living in its vicinity. Illegal activities like fishing, poaching, cattle grazing, waste dumping, etc., almost destroyed the lake's ecology.

== Tourism ==
The lake is flocked by tourists who wish to spend quality time among the soothing waves. The development of a canoeing & kayaking stadium is also underway, and there are further plans to develop it as a water-sports & tourism destination.

== Fishing ==
Fishing activities also take place in the lake. A set of fish are harvested by the Fisheries Department.

== See also ==
- Sirpur Lake
- Indore
- Yashwant Sagar
