= Institute of Engineering and Technology, DAVV =

College in Madhya Pradesh

Institute of Engineering & Technology, DAVV
- Motto: At Forefront of Engineering Education
- Type: Public Self Financed
- Established: 1996
- Parent institution: Devi Ahilya Vishwavidyalaya
- Affiliations: UGC, NAAC, AICTE
- Academic affiliations: DAVV, RGPV, Directorate of Technical Education MP; Higher Education Department MP
- Dean: Pratosh Bansal
- Director: Pratosh Bansal
- Undergraduates: 2775
- Postgraduates: 240
- Location: IET Campus, Khandwa Road, Indore, Madhya Pradesh, India; 22.681°N 75.880°E
- Campus: 110 Acre; Urban
- Website: www.ietdavv.edu.in

The Institute of Engineering & Technology, DAVV commonly referred to as IET, or IET DAVV is the engineering school of Devi Ahilya Vishwavidyalaya. It was founded as an autonomous institute in 1996. The college is located near the university's Takshashila Campus on Khandwa Road in the south-east of Indore, Madhya Pradesh, India. It is an approved Institution by AICTE and University Grants Commission (UGC).

== Academics ==
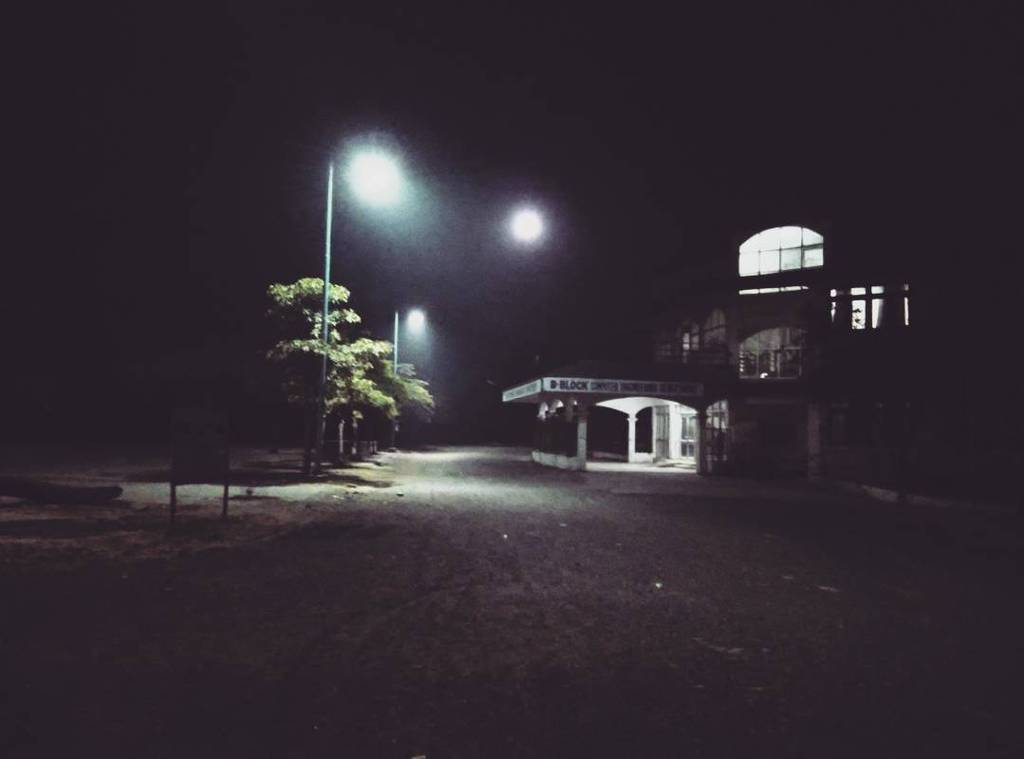
Computer Engineering Block of IET DAVV

The institute offers various B.E. and M.E. programmes.

The institute started to offer B.Tech. in Computer Science and Business System in partnership with TCS.

The admission to B.E/B.Tech is through the JEE (Main) exam.

== Invento ==
Invento is the annual technical festival of the Institute of Engineering and Technology, DAVV which is held in August and September. It is organized by the students and the members of IET DAVV. Invento is a two-day event on the campus with workshops, competitions, lectures, conferences, exhibitions, performances and various other events.

Former to Invento, Phoenix was the annual technological festival organized by the IET DAVV in 2009–2011.

== Academic departments ==
=== Departments ===
- Computer Engineering
- Information Technology
- Mechanical Engineering
- Civil Engineering
- Electronics & Telecommunication
- Electronics & Instrumentation
- Computer Science and Business Systems
- Bachelor of Design

== Campus ==
The campus spreads over 110 acres and is located in Indore.

== See also ==
- Shri Govindram Seksaria Institute of Technology and Science
