= Devi Ahilya Vishwavidyalaya =

State University in Madhya Pradesh

Coordinates: 22.716°N 75.871°E

- Other name: DAVV
- Former name: University of Indore
- Motto: dhiyo yo naḥ prachodayāt (Sanskrit)
- Motto in English: God help us to improve our intellect, and guide it towards what is right
- Type: Public
- Established: 1964; 62 years ago
- Affiliations: UGC, AICTE, NAAC, ACU, AIU, PCI, NCTE, BCI
- Chancellor: Governor of Madhya Pradesh
- Vice-Chancellor: Rakesh Singhai
- Academic staff: 250 (2012)
- Students: 9,550 (2012)
- Location: Indore, Madhya Pradesh, India
- Campus: Urban, 764 Acres in area
- Website: www.dauniv.ac.in

Devi Ahilya Vishwavidyalaya (informally abbreviated DAVV), formerly University of Indore, is a state university located in Indore, India. It was named after Ahilya Bai Holkar, the 18th century Queen and ruler of Indore, daughter in law of Malhar Rao Holkar who was the founder of Holkar Dynasty.

The university's jurisdiction was initially restricted to Indore city. Later on, its jurisdiction was extended to seven tribal-dominated districts of Indore division namely, Jhabua, Alirajpur, Dhar, Khargone, Khandwa, Burhanpur and Barwani. It is thus catering to the educational needs of the most industrially developed district of Madhya Pradesh, Indore on one hand and to the seven tribal and rural backward districts of the State on the other.

== History ==
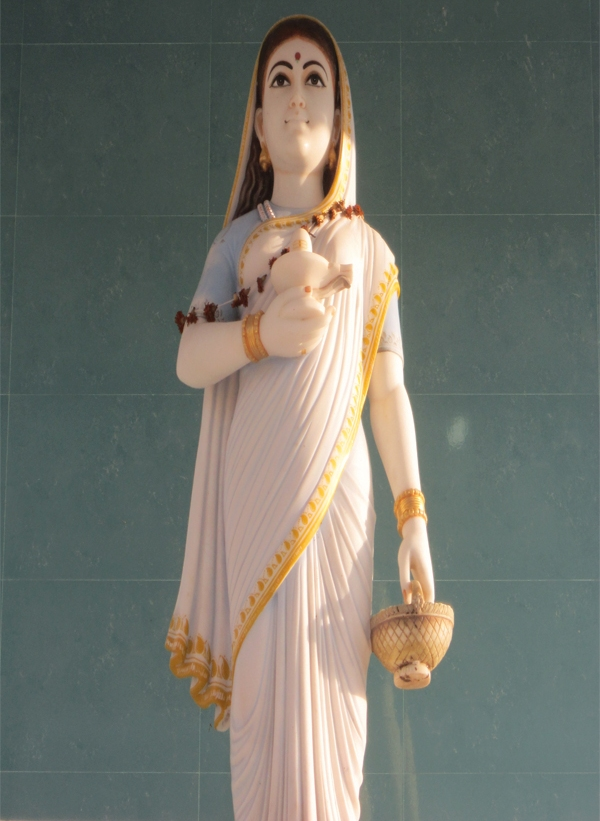
Statue of Her Highness Maharani Shrimant Akhand Soubhagyavati Ahilya Bai Sahiba at Datta Temple, Sahastra Dhara, Jalkoti

Devi Ahilya Vishwavidyalaya formerly University of Indore was established in 1964 by an Act of Legislature of Madhya Pradesh. Dr. Zakir Hussain, then Vice President of India, inaugurated the university in 1964. The jurisdiction of the university was limited to Indore district. Narayan Prasad Shukla, during his tenure as Mayor of Indore and as a political leader in the region, played a role in the establishment of Indore University, which was later renamed Devi Ahilya Vishwavidyalaya.

In 1982, the university was renamed after the Holkar Maharani 'Devi Ahilya Bai Holkar' of the Maratha Empire as 'Devi Ahilya Vishwavidyalaya'. The word vishwavidyalaya is Hindi for university, thus, the university is called Devi Ahilya Vishwavidyalaya.

During reorganization of the universities, its jurisdiction was expanded over to Indore division, which spans seven districts

== Campus ==
The university has its administrative offices and primary school campus on Rabindranath Tagore Marg in Indore. The Takshashila Campus on 139, Khandwa Road, Indra Puri Colony, Indore, Madhya Pradesh 452001 is an extension campus directly administered by the university. The university regulates all the schools within the three campuses. There are many other colleges affiliated to the university in Indore division. The university has more than 300 affiliated colleges imparting education at under-graduate and post-graduate levels in basic and professional disciplines. The university has 9000 students in its campus and total over 300,000 students in affiliated colleges.

University spreads over an area of 760 acres in which academic classes holds in Takshila parisar (campus) of university which spreads over an area of 510 acres and Avanti parisar (campus) which spreads over 154 acres. Nalanda parisar (campus) is for administrative and official works which spreads over an area of 100 acres.

Recently Section 52 of the MP State Government Universities’ Act was applied on the university and the Vice Chancellor, Narendra Dhakad was removed due to gross mismanagement and corruption charges. A new Vice Chancellor Renu Jain, has been appointed in his place.

== Academics ==
Every college in university teaching department is autonomous.

=== Conventional courses ===
During the initial stages of its development 1964–1984, university established conventional School of Studies in Physics, Mathematics, Statistics, and Chemistry. It was one of the first few universities to start B.Ed. in 1968 and MBA in 1969. It later started Life Sciences, Economics, Biochemistry and Journalism.

=== Self-supporting courses ===
University is one of the first in starting as early as 1991 the experiment of self-supporting courses in order to have partial support for the development of infrastructure. This experiment has certainly made a positive impact on the overall development of the university both in terms of employment opportunities on one side and students needs on the other.

=== Engineering courses and medical courses ===
The Engineering and Technology (I.E.T.) Institute of Engineering and Technology, DAVV has started functioning since 1996 and now runs number of B.E. and M.E. courses. The admissions in I.E.T. is held through Madhya Pradesh Pre-Engineering Test (M.P.P.E.T.), which will be further altered in 2014 under which admissions will be held on the basis of all India ranking in Joint Entrance Exam (J.E.E.). University also runs medical and dental colleges.

=== Special assistance programme ===
UGC has granted SAPs to School of Education, School of Economics, School of Life Sciences and School of Physics in the university.

=== Information Technology and Applications ===
Previous work: University made another change during 1998-2002 by establishing campus wide fiber network and Internet facilities throughout the educational and administrative campuses of the university. M.Sc. (Information Technology) and M.Tech. (Embedded Systems) were also started during this period. Recent Initiatives : University has initiated another change from Aug. 2006 by installing LCD Projectors and Internet access points in all class rooms, e-management of the university, e-submission of fees and forms by the students, Wi-Fi Campus and Hostels, e-grant of migration and eligibility certificates to students and establishment of e-record room. It is expected that this move will mitigate student hard ship in getting administrative services from University and facilitate its employees to work with latest Computers, Servers and Internet.

=== Central library ===
The university library was established in the year 1964 along with the establishment of the university. The university library caters to the information needs of the academic community. The university library started the Bachelor of Library and Information Science Program from the 1993–94 year, as a part-time course, with its goals to train the manpower to manage the libraries of the 21st century. The library has over 200,000 books.

== Organisation and Administration ==
=== Institutes ===
- School of Data Science and Forecasting (SDSF)
- School of Pharmacy (SOP)
- Academic Staff College
- Bahá'í Chair for Studies in Development
- Centre for Science Communication
- Centre for e-Business
- Centre for Lifelong Learning
- Department of Adult / Continuing Education & Extension
- Department of Student Welfare (DSW)
- Directorate of Distance Education
- Educational Multimedia Research Centre
- Information & Communication Technology Centre
- Institute of Engineering & Technology (IET)
- Institute of Management Studies (IMS)
- International Institute of Professional Studies
- School of Advanced Liberal Studies
- School of Anthropology
- School of Biochemistry
- School of Biotechnology
- School of Chemical Science
- School of Commerce
- School of Comparative Language & Culture
- School of Computer Science And Information Technology (SCSIT)
- School of Economics (SOE)
- School of Education
- School of Energy and Environmental Studies (SEES)
- School of Electronics
- School of Futures Studies and Planning (FSP)
- School of Journalism And Mass Communication
- School of Law
- School of Life Sciences
- School of Instrumentation
- School of Social Sciences(SOSS)
- School of Statistics(SoSt)

=== Affiliated Colleges ===
The university also operates on a system of affiliated colleges, wherein semi independent institutions are associated with DAVV, adhering to its academic regulations and curriculum.

These colleges offer various undergraduate and postgraduate courses, with examinations conducted by the university and degrees awarded under its emblem. Among its prominent affiliated colleges are the Daly College of Business Management, known for business education; the Indore Institute of Law, offering legal studies; the Renaissance Institute of Management Studies, specializing in management education; and the Acropolis Institute of Management Studies & Research, offering management courses.

=== E-management studies ===
Devi Ahilya Vishwavidyalaya is one of the first few universities which started the MBA course as early as in 1969. Devi Ahilya Vishwavidyalaya is also one of the first few universities which started the computer center and computer courses of MCA and M.Sc. Computer Science in the country as early as 1986. Management and computer schools of studies are known in the country for their new initiatives during last 25 years. They are also known for starting several innovative courses first time in the country. University has also taken one of the first few initiatives in the country in 1998 for setting an Information Technology Center (ITC) with fiber backbone spread all over the campuses and advanced the then fast switches and router based network. ITC has been completed with the provision of high speed Internet access and best of the computing resources for the university students, faculty, research scholars and staff round the clock. UGC have selected DAVV as Centre with Potential for Excellence in e management studies.

=== Information technology center ===
IT Centre was established in the year 2000 to create a campus-wide network by interconnecting various campuses and departments. First phase which was completed in April 2001, networked 18 departments having 524 nodes. Second phase was completed in Oct 2002, which connected ten more departments and installed 331 additional nodes. Under UGC-INFONET scheme, from Jan 2004, UGC has provided university free subscription to the various e-journals along with 2 Mbit/s bandwidth through ERNET. Internet access is provided to all departments using fibre optic backbone & 16 Mbit/s leased line.

=== University cultural center ===
The university auditorium was inaugurated on 30 September 2005 by Dr. Balram Jakhar, Governor, M.P.

=== Rankings ===
Ministry of Education Government of India

NIRF India Rankings
- 2021 (University): 101-150
- 2022 (Overall): 151-200
- 2023 (University): 101-150
- 2024 (State Public University): 50
- 2025 (State Public University): 49

Devi Ahilya Vishwavidyalaya has consistently featured in the National Institutional Ranking Framework rankings, reflecting its position within the Indian higher education landscape.

The university participates annually in the NIRF rankings, a methodology adopted by the Ministry of Education, Government of India, to rank institutions of higher education across the country.

In 2023, Devi Ahilya Vishwavidyalaya was accredited with an "A+" grade by the National Assessment and Accreditation Council (NAAC).

== Research ==
Apart from specialized schools of studies university also conducts several research works with assistance of UGC. For this university have a separate committee of deans which suggest ways to streamline the entire process of Ph.D. thesis evaluation mechanism. The university have established a Sodha Peeth on Devi Ahilya to motivate research on regional issues. New postgraduate degree programmes in research on their lines of IITs/Central universities are envisaged.

== Student life ==
=== Gyanvani FM Radio ===
Gyanvani FM Radio was established in June 2006. It delivers educational content through radio to cross-segment of the society.

== Notable alumni ==
- Gen. Manoj Mukund Naravane
- Waibhav Anil Kale
- Lieutenant General Gurmit Singh
- Sumitra Mahajan
- Tulsi Silawat
- Aavriti Choudhary
- Antar Singh Darbar
- Siddhartha Paul Tiwari
- Satish Modh
- Shubhangi Atre
- Ibrahim Ashk
- Gaurav Arora
- Paridhi Sharma
- Ranjana Baghel
- Kailash Vijayvargiya
- Zameer Uddin Shah
- Jitu Patwari
- Bala Bachchan
- Meenakshi Natarajan
- Akash Vijayvargiya
- Kennedy Mong'are Okong'o
- Lieutenant General Vinod G. Khandare
- Kishore Kumar
