= Indore Bus Rapid Transit System =

Indore BRTS

Overview
- Locale: Indore, Madhya Pradesh, India
- Transit type: Bus rapid transit
- Number of lines: 10

Operation
- Began operation: 10 May 2013
- Operators: Government of Madhya Pradesh; Indore Municipal Corporation; Indore City Bus

Technical
- System length: 126.46 kilometres (78.58 mi)

The Indore BRTS or Ahilya Path Designed by Resident Engineer Shrilal Prasad NiralaTeam Leader of TCPL Indore is the bus rapid transit system for the city of Indore, Madhya Pradesh by AICTSL also called i-Bus(Intelligent Bus), became operational from 10 May 2013. The Indore BRTS project started in 2007 under the Jawaharlal Nehru National Urban Renewal Mission (JNNURM). It involves the participation of the Governments of India and Madhya Pradesh, and the World Bank.

The UK-based Serco won the operation and maintenance contract of the BRT from Atal Indore City Transport Services Ltd (AICTSL), a joint venture between Indore Development Authority and Indore Municipal Corporation, which was set up to operate and manage the public transport system in the city. The company will operate and maintain the fleet of the 50 low-floor and air conditioned buses. It will also manage the operations control center and a depot for the corridor.

Under the SUTP, the Global Environment Facility will fund the setting up of the GPS-enabled Intelligent Transport System (ITS) on the BRTS.

The corridor is fully equipped with free high-speed Wi-Fi internet service for commuters, provided by Free As Air.

The ITS architecture will boast, among other high-tech features, of advance signal systems based on data-centric algorithms for emergency pre-emption and network surveillance with CCTV cameras. The SUTP also envisages support for the BRTS through two Traffic Signal Prioritisation and Automatic Fare Collection plans. These include traffic signal co-ordination with adaptive signal control and a centralised traffic control centre managing 46 traffic signals and priority for BRTS buses.

The BRTS will have Automatic Fare Collection System (AFCS), which will facilitate off-board fare collection. There will also be a Ticket Office Terminal for issuing "contactless smart cards." Under the AFCS, fares will be collected by a private company on behalf of Indore City Bus.

The company, under a 10-year contract, will be responsible for the supply, installation, maintenance and operation of the AFCS, besides providing the personnel required. A similar contract-based system is planned for the AFCS of BRTS-Ahmedabad.

While the completed BRTS will cover 106 km, connecting all major corridors in Indore, Phase-I of the project proposes three corridors: the AB Road pilot corridor, the Vijayanagar Chowraha-Ujjain Road junction and Ujjain Road junction-the Airport. The current Rs. 130-crore AB Road pilot corridor runs along 11.7 km and will cater to around 70,000 passengers daily. BRTS may also be linked to the upcoming Indore Metro as planned

== Corridors ==
The following corridors were proposed to be executed under JNNURM.

Corridor routes
Corridor No	Route	Length (km)
1	AB. Road	23.8 km
2	Eastern Ring Road	23.65 km
3	M.R. 10 Corridor	8.71 km
4	River Side Road Corridor	14.5 km
5	Western Ring Road	15.9 km
6	Badaganpti – Airport	5.3 km
7	RW2 Ujjain Road-AIrport	9.5 km
Other	M.G Road, RNT Road and YN Road	19.1 km

== Project Status ==
23 June 2009 :

- Six consultants have been shortlisted for Phase-I of BRTS.

15 July 2012 :

- The 14 km-long proposed Indore BRTS project worth Rs 140 crore would be ready by September – 2012.

2 February 2013 :

- BRTS to become operational in Indore from April 2013.

10 May 2013 :

- BRTS becomes operational in Indore with 16 buses plying.

01 Nov 2025 :

- BRTS corridor in Indore is being dismantled following the directive of the Madhya Pradesh High Court, on grounds that increased vehicular traffic had rendered the dedicated corridor impractical. However, the bus service is likely to continue despite the dismantling of the dedicated corridor
