= Indore City Bus =

Metropolitan bus system in the Indian City of Indore

- Commenced operation: 26 January 2006; 19 years ago
- Headquarters: Plot. No.30 Residency Area, A.B. Road, Opp. M.G.M. Medical College, Indore
- Locale: Indore; Mhow; Rau; Hatod; Pithampur; Manpur
- Routes: 32
- Fleet: Tata Starbus; Ashok Leyland; Eicher Motors
- Daily ridership: 2,50,000
- Operator: AICTSL
- Chief executive: Malini Gaud, (Mayor of Indore City)
- Website: www.citybusindore.com

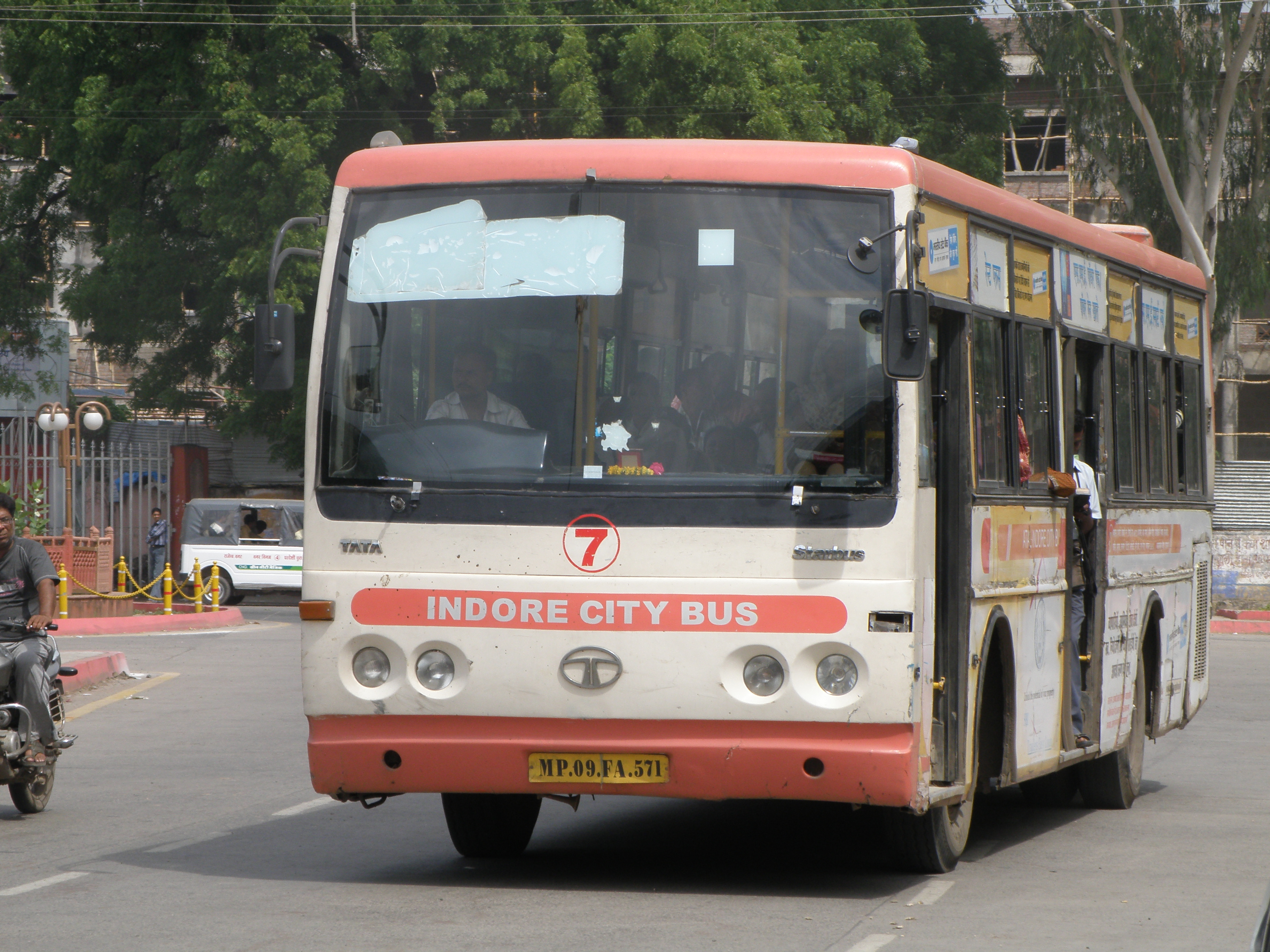
Indore City Bus

Indore City Bus is a road transport system run by Atal Indore City Transport Services Limited or AICTSL. This transport system runs through 277 kilometers of road network in the Indore city and surrounding areas. The city bus service has 6 private partners along with the city administration and the total investment has gone more than 40 Crores.

== History of local transportation in Indore ==
Indore is the largest metropolitan city of the state of Madhya Pradesh and a center of trade and commerce. The city is growing rapidly with need for increasing mobility, high travel demand, increasing intensity of traffic, congestion, delays, accidents and other transportation problems.

The intra-city public transport system is essentially road based with 500 private minibuses, 550 tempos(to reduce pollution now replaced by Maruti van as contract carrier), more than 100 Metro Taxi (Flat fare Rs.11.95 per KM) and 10,000 auto rickshaws. The city felt a lack of public mass transport system for long time.

== Company ==
Indore City Transport Services Limited was incorporated on 1 December 2005 with an objective to operate and manage the public transport system of Indore. Seven key people were identified as the Board of Directors. Indore Municipal Corporation and Indore Development Authority invested an authorized capital of Rs 2,500,000 jointly. The collector of Indore, Vivek Aggarwal was responsible for the execution of the project to run the bus service. The company is run as a public-private partnership.

== Operations ==
As of now, the AICTSL runs a total of 188 buses. The city bus routes are spread citywide and also to neighboring cities. Majority of city bus consist of ordinary route. Limited bus services which skips minor stops is used on Long routes, high capacity routes and routes that provides connectivity beyond Indore city. The buses have colour strips appended to routes. Green coloured buses connect Indore with Mhow. Some buses like yellow and orange go beyond Indore region to Pithampur and Gandhinagar area. Buses with magenta strip mostly serve BRTS and provide connection AB Road and buses coloured blue serve Rajwada region. The AICTSL uses CNG powered buses for its operation.

| S.no. | Route no. | Start | End Place |
|---|---|---|---|
| 1 | 04 (IV) | Vaishali Nagar | Panchwati |
| 2 | 05 (V) | Arvindo Hospital | Mhow Naka |
| 3 | 07 (VII) | Tejaji Nagar | Gandhi Nagar (Indore) |
| 4 | 09 (IX) | Manawta Nagar | Hawa Bungalow |
| 5 | 11 (XI) | Tejaji Nagar | Gommatgiri |
| 6 | 12 (XII) | Manawta Nagar | Rajwada |
| 7 | 13 (XIII) | Rajwada | Khajrana |
| 8 | 16(XVI) | Nurani Nagar | Musakhedi |
| 9 | 17 (XVII) | Palda Naka | MR10 |
| 10 | 25 (XXV) | Railway Station | IndoRama |
| 11 | 26 (XXVI) | Indore | Eicher Square (Pithampur) |

=== Suburbs ===
The Indore City Transport Service Corporation operates inter-city services to six different areas beyond the municipal limits of Indore city, i.e. into the limits of the bordering corporations of Mhow, Rau, Hatod, Pithampur, Manpur & Bhopal. Two new suburbs Runji Gautampura and Depalpur also added in city bus circle on 15 December 2012. The ICTSL supplements suburban buses, which is the mass carrier on Indore region. It is for this reason that ICTSL always gives priority for feeder routes are given more priority than other routes.

== Rates and passes ==
The city bus offers daily passes to regular travelers. The city bus fare has been increased by Rs. 1 and now its even more . The minimum charge for city bus is Rs. 5 and the monthly pass rate has been increased to Rs.800. This increase was attributed towards the recent crude oil price hike which made diesel and petrol costlier in India. However, there's a special concession for students that offers monthly pass at Rs.200 a month.

== Accolades ==
Noted writer Gurcharan Das wrote in his blog on how Indore's bus service could prove to be helpful in solving New Delhi's bus transport problems. Blueline buses killed as many as 488 people in New Delhi during the 3-year span of 2005–2008. Gurcharan writes "Indore is now quoted (with Bogotá) as having the best bus service in the world".
