= Indore Development Authority =

- IDA
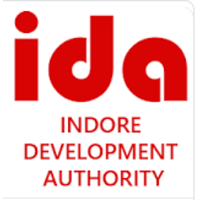

State agency overview
- Formed: 13 January 1973
- Preceding State agency: City Development Trust, Indore
- Type: Urban planning
- Jurisdiction: Government of Madhya Pradesh
- Headquarters: Indore, Madhya Pradesh
- Motto: Where Construction is a Never Ending Process
- Annual budget: ₹ 10 billion
- Minister responsible: Chief Minister of Madhya Pradesh
- State agency executives: Jaypal Singh Chawda, Chairman IDA; Shri Ram Prakash Ahirwar, CEO; Dr.Ilayaraja T IAS, Collector Indore; Pawan Sharma IAS, Divisional Commissioner; Golu Shukla, Vice-Chairman
- Parent department: Government of Madhya Pradesh
- Key document
- Website: idaindore.org

Indore Development Authority, also known as IDA, is the urban planning agency serving Indore Metropolitan Region of the Indian state of Madhya Pradesh. It was established in 1973 under Madhya Pradesh Town and Country Planning Act, 1973. The current Chairman of IDA is Jaypal Singh Chawda. The headquarters of the authority is 7, Race Course Road, Indore.

== History ==
Town and country planning office Bhopal, preparing the master plan for Indore. The role of IDA is to implement the master plan. The present master plan is proposed for the year 2011. The proposals related to development of residential schemes, new links in the present transportation network etc. The master plan gives only the proposal. IDA work out the methodology of its implementation. For example, there are some proposals related to residential development in the fringes, the plans for these fringe areas are being prepared by architects of IDA. A number of alternatives are available, then the first job is to choose the correct alternative, the second is look at the practicality of the projects. If the housing scheme is prepared, the very first point is that who will accommodate in that site. Secondly what commercial activities might be developed there. The provision for the physical connection of the scheme with the city, i.e. transportation facilities is taken into the account. Provision of water supply, sewage lines and electricity plan for all is worked out in IDA. The symbol of urbanization which is directly perceived by common people. “The development of land in an organized manner”. The common people do their investment in this activity. IDA provides a platform for people to participate in the development. IDA sells the plots in the scheme, IDA provides the land at reasonable prices and it is generally safe measure to invest in the land in an authorized colony. These colonies are well planned and well furnished with all the facilities and utilities. The function of IDA is to control and regulate the development. If the private developers make plans for any institutional, residential or any other area, then they are required to be approved by IDA. If the plan does not meet according the requirement of existing proposal of the master plan then it is not given the approval. In case if the matter is not solved by the IDA then it goes to the TCPO.

== Departments ==
The authority is divided into the twelve departments.

1. Engineering
2. Finance
3. Town planning
4. Architecture
5. Legal
6. Monitoring
7. Enforcement
8. Vigilance
9. Establishment and Authority
10. Policy
11. Land acquisition
12. Information technology

== See also ==
- Urban planning
