= Malwa =

- Natural region (former administrative division)
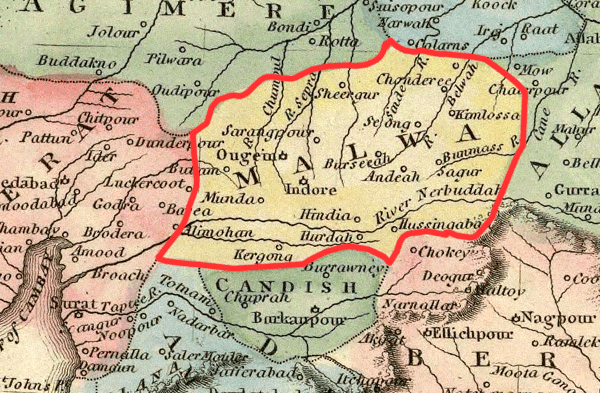
- Malwa (highlighted) as per 1823 depiction of India by Fielding Lucas Jr.
- Country: India

Area
  - Total: 83,535 km^{2} (32,253 sq mi)
- Elevation: 500 m (1,600 ft)

Population (2011)
  - Total: 22,773,993
  - Density: 272.63/km^{2} (706.10/sq mi)

Languages
  - Major languages: Malwi, Hindi
- Time zone: UTC+05:30 (IST)
- ISO 3166 code: IN-MP
- Largest city: Indore

Malwa (IPA: [maːlʋaː]) is a historical region of west-central India occupying a plateau of volcanic origin. Geologically, the Malwa Plateau generally refers to the volcanic upland north of the Vindhya Range. Politically and administratively, it is also synonymous with the former state of Madhya Bharat which was later merged with Madhya Pradesh. At present the historical Malwa region includes districts of western Madhya Pradesh and parts of south-eastern Rajasthan. Sometimes the definition of Malwa is extended to include the Nimar region south of the Vindhyas.

The Malwa region had been a separate political unit from the time of the ancient Malava Kingdom, and has been ruled by several kingdoms and dynasties. Malwa continued to be an administrative division until 1947, when the Malwa Agency of British India was merged into Madhya Bharat (also known as Malwa Union) state of independent India.

Although its political borders have fluctuated throughout history, the region has developed its own distinct culture, influenced by the Rajasthani, Marathi and Gujarati cultures. Several prominent people in the history of India have lived in Malwa, including the poet and dramatist Kalidasa, the author Bhartrihari, the mathematicians and astronomers Varahamihira and Brahmagupta, and the polymath king Bhoja. Ujjain had been the political, economic, and cultural capital of the region in ancient times, and Indore is now the largest city and commercial center.

Overall, agriculture is the main occupation of the people of Malwa. The region has been one of the important producers of opium in the world. Wheat and soybeans are other important cash crops, and textiles are a major industry.

Malwi is a demonym given to people from the Malwa region.

== History ==
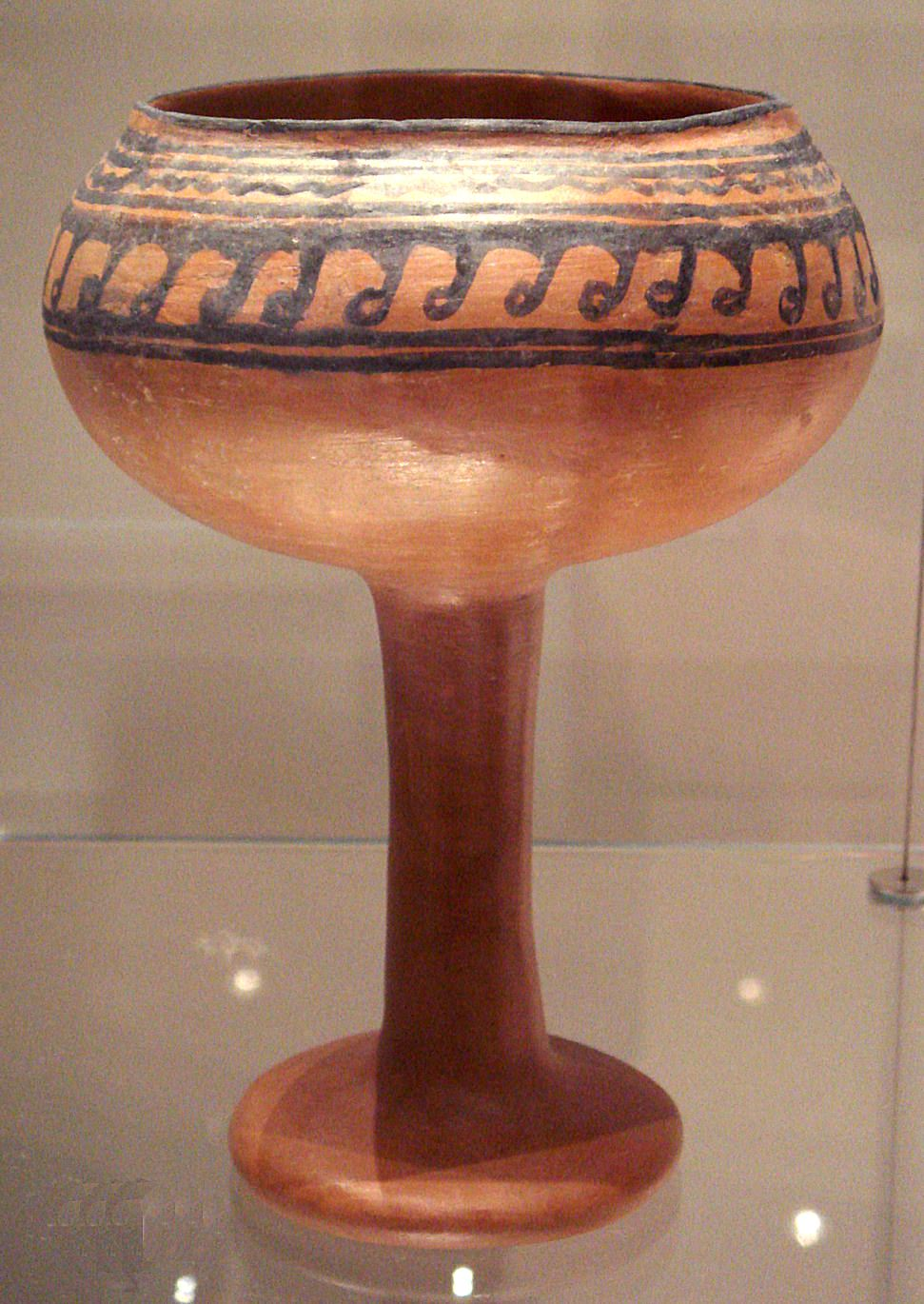
Ceramic goblet of the Malwa culture from Navdatoli, Malwa, 1300 BC.

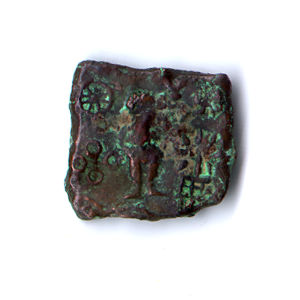
Coin showing Karttikeya and Lakshmi (Ujjain, c. 150–75 BC)

Several early Stone Age or Lower Paleolithic habitations have been excavated in eastern Malwa. The name Malwa is derived from the name of the ancient Indian tribe of Malavas. The name Malava is said to be derived from the Sanskrit term Malav, which means "part of the abode of Lakshmi". The location of the Malwa or Moholo, mentioned by the 7th-century Chinese traveller Xuanzang, is plausibly identified with present-day Gujarat. The region is cited as Malibah in Arabic records, such as Kamilu-t Tawarikh by Ibn Asir.

The Malwa Culture was a Chalcolithic archaeological culture which existed in the Malwa region, as well as nearby parts of Maharashtra to the south, during the 2nd millennium BC.

Ujjain, also known historically as Ujjaiyini and Avanti, emerged as the first major centre in the Malwa region during India's second wave of urbanisation in the 7th century BC (the first wave was the Indus Valley Civilization). Around 600 BC an earthen rampart was built around Ujjain, enclosing a city of considerable size. Ujjain was the capital city of the Avanti kingdom, one of the prominent mahajanapadas of ancient India. In the post-Mahabharata period—around 500 BC—Avanti was an important kingdom in western India; it was ruled by the Haihayas, a people who were responsible for the destruction of Naga power in western India.

The region was conquered by the Nanda Empire in the mid-4th century BC, and subsequently became part of the Maurya Empire. Ashoka, who was later a Mauryan emperor, was governor of Ujjain in his youth. After the death of Ashoka in 232 BC, the Maurya Empire began to collapse. Although evidence is sparse, Malwa was probably ruled by the Kushanas, the Shakas and the Satavahana dynasty during the 1st and 2nd century AD. Ownership of the region was the subject of dispute between the Western Kshatrapas and the Satavahanas during the first three centuries AD. Ujjain emerged a major trading centre during the 1st century AD

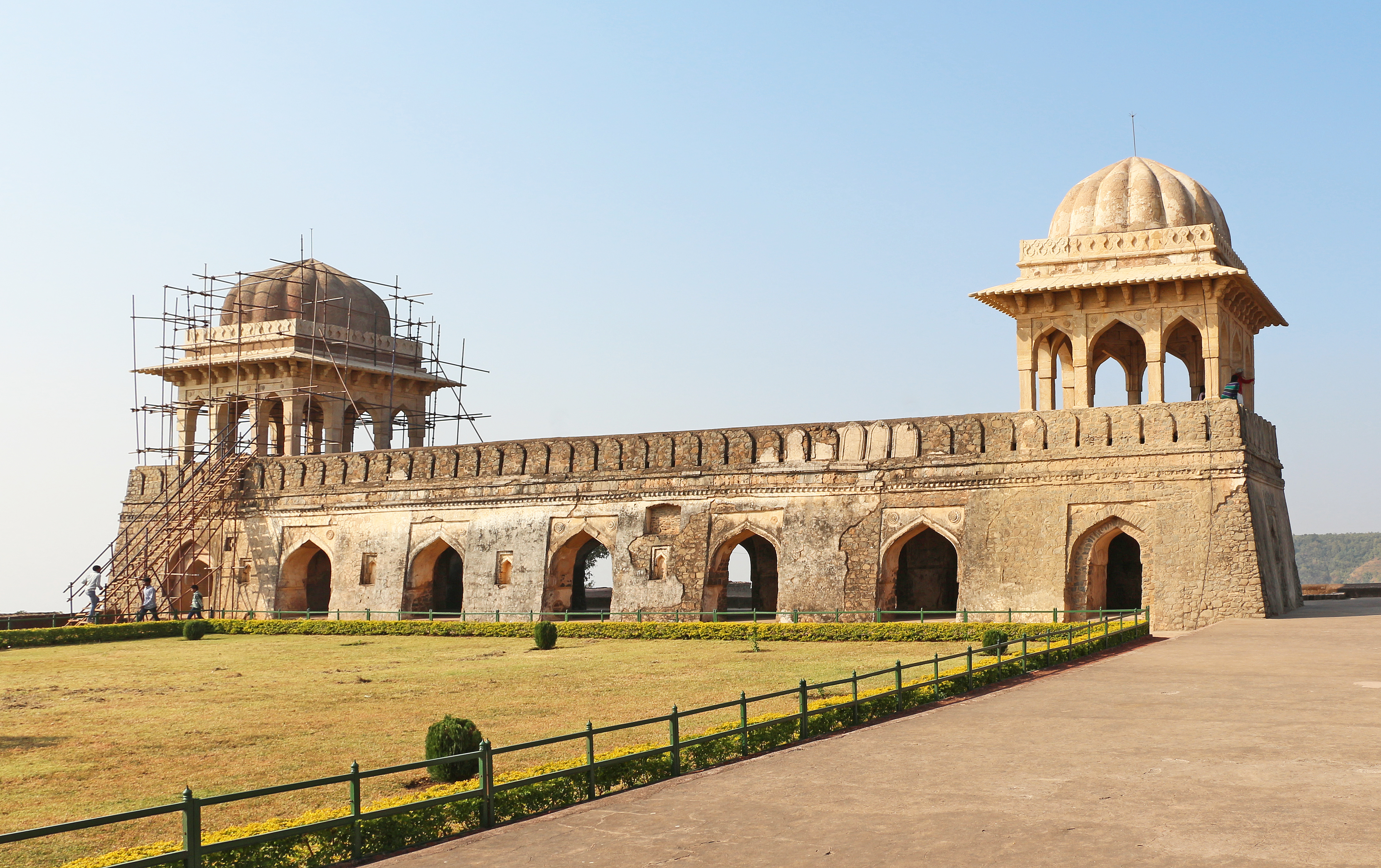
Rani Roopmati Pavilion at Mandu, built by Miyan Bayezid Baz Bahadur (1555–62)

Malwa became part of the Gupta Empire during the reign of Chandragupta II (375–413), also known as Vikramaditya, who conquered the region, driving out the Western Kshatrapas. The Gupta period is widely regarded as a golden age in the history of Malwa, when Ujjain served as the empire's western capital. The astronomer Varahamihira was based in Ujjain, which emerged as a major centre of learning, especially in astronomy and mathematics. Around 500, Malwa re-emerged from the dissolving Gupta Empire as a separate kingdom; in 528, Yasodharman of Malwa defeated the Hunas, who had invaded India from the north-west.

During the seventh century, the region became part of Harsha's empire, who disputed the region with the Chalukya king Pulakesin II of Badami in the Deccan. During his reign the Buddhist pilgrim monk Xuanzang had visited India and mentions seeing a hundred Buddhist monasteries along with a same number of Deva temples of different kinds with the adherents of Pashupata Shaivism making a majority. He also states that there were two places in India that were remarkable for the great learning of the people, viz., Malwa and Magadha. The people there esteemed virtue, were of an intelligent mind and exceedingly studious.

In 756 AD Gurjara-Pratiharas advanced into Malwa. In 786 the region was captured by the Rashtrakuta kings of the Deccan, and was disputed between the Rashtrakutas and the Gurjara Pratihara kings of Kannauj until the early part of the tenth century. The Emperors of the Rashtrakuta dynasty appointed the Paramara rulers as governors of Malwa. From the mid-tenth century, Kingdom of Malwa was ruled by the Paramaras, who established a capital at Dhar. King Bhoja, who ruled from about 1010 to 1060, was known as the great polymath philosopher-king of medieval India; his extensive writings cover philosophy, poetry, medicine, architecture, construction, town planning, veterinary science, phonetics, yoga, and archery. Malwa became an intellectual centre of India, and became home to a major astronomical observatory, attracting scholars from all over India including Bhāskara II. His successors ruled until about 1305, when Malwa was conquered by the Delhi Sultanate. Malwa was several times invaded by the south Indian Western Chalukya Empire.

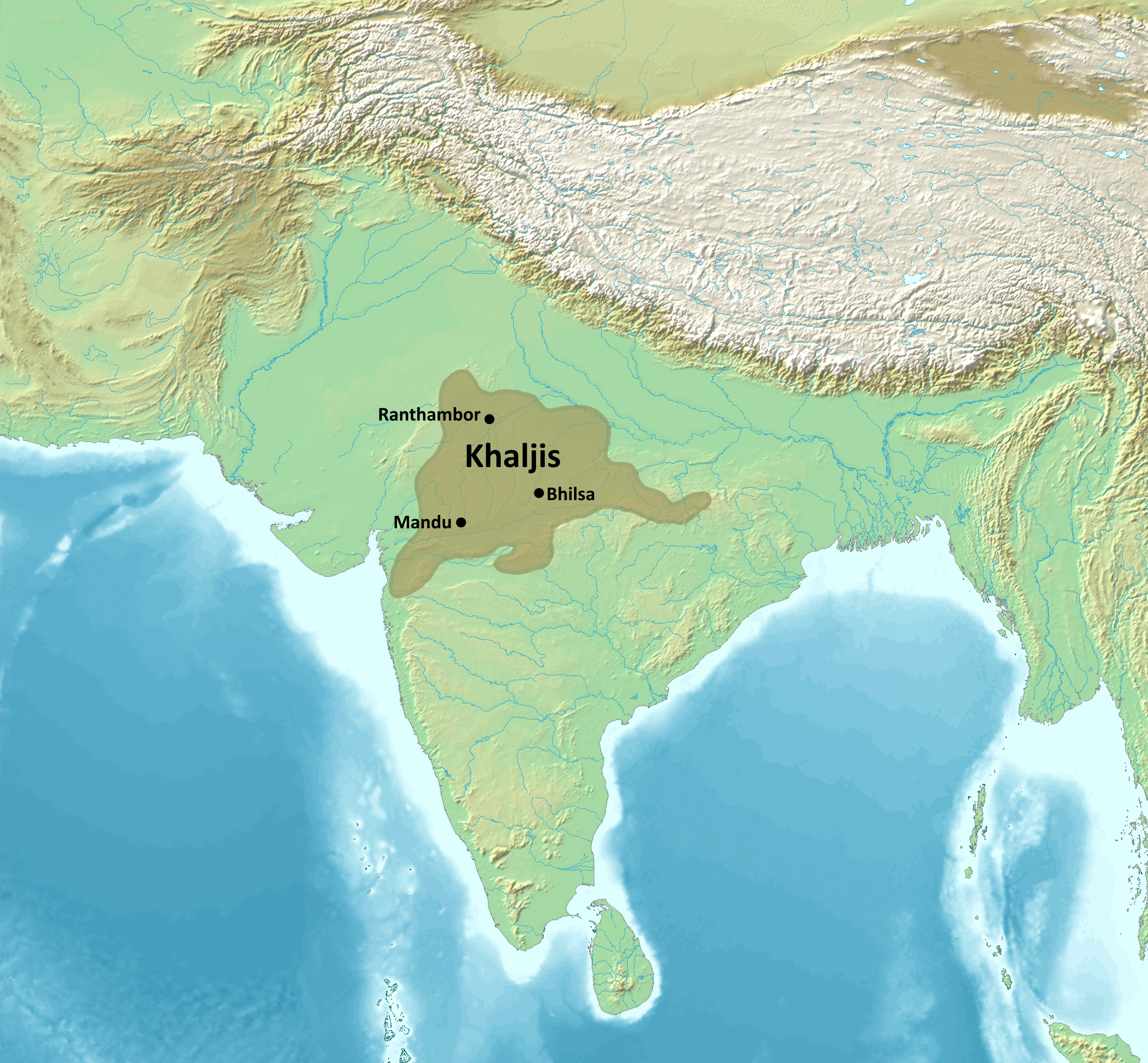
Map of the Khaljis of Malwa at their height

Dilawar Khan, previously Malwa's governor under the rule of the Delhi sultanate, declared himself sultan of Malwa in 1401 after the Mughal conqueror Timur attacked Delhi, causing the break-up of the sultanate into smaller states. Khan started the Malwa Sultanate and established a capital at Mandu, high in the Vindhya Range overlooking the Narmada River valley. His son and successor, Hoshang Shah (1405–35), developed Mandu as an important city. Hoshang Shah's son, Ghazni Khan, ruled for only a year and was succeeded by Mahmud Khalji (1436–69), the first of the Khalji sultans of Malwa, who expanded the state to include parts of Gujarat, Rajasthan, and the Deccan. The Muslim sultans invited the Rajputs to settle in the country. Rajputs from various clans came and settled in Malwa. They came from different parts of Rajasthan, Gujarat, and many other regions of India. In the early 16th century, the sultan sought the aid of the sultans of Gujarat to counter the growing power of the Rajputs, while the Rajputs sought the support of the Sesodia Rajput kings of Mewar. During that time Much of the Malwa was conquered by Rana Sanga of Mewar who appointed one of his close allies Medini Rai as ruler of Malwa under his lordship. Chanderi was capital of his kingdom.After the defeat of Rajput confederation in Battle of Khanwa near Agra against Babur which was fought for Supremacy of Northern India between Rajputs and Mughals.Babur then sieged Chanderi offering Shamsabad to Medini rai instead of Chanderi as it was the capital of his kingdom and was of great importance but Rai refused Babur's offer and chose to die. He was defeated by Babur in January 1528 at Battle of Chanderi and Babur conquered the fort.

Gujarat stormed Mandu in 1518. In 1531, Bahadur Shah of Gujarat, captured Mandu, executed Mahmud II (1511–31), and shortly after that, the Malwa sultanate collapsed. The Mughal emperor Akbar captured Malwa in 1562 and made it a subah (province) of his empire. The Malwa Subah existed from 1568 to 1743. Mandu was abandoned by the 17th century. During the 17th century much of Western Malwa was held by the Rathors of the Ratanawat branch. The Ratanawats later broke into several states which later became Ratlam State, Sitamau State and Sailana State. Some of the lesser states were Multhan and Kachi-Baroda.

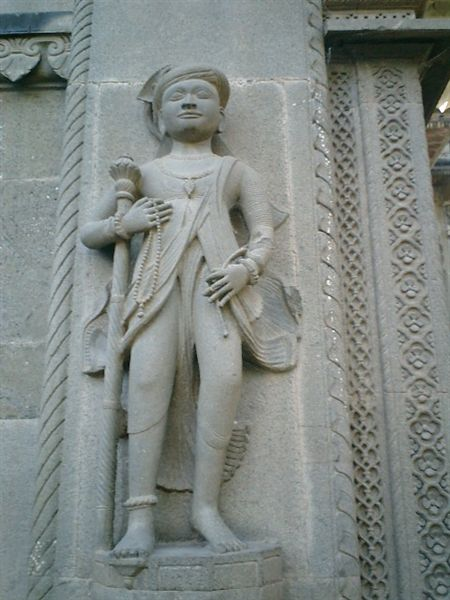
Sculpture of a Holkar courtier from Fort Ahilya.

As the Mughal state weakened after 1700, the Marathas held sway over Malwa under leadership of Chimnaji Appa, Nemaji Shinde and Chimnaji Damodar were the first Maratha generals to cross the boundary of Maharashtra and to invade in Malwa in 1698. Subsequently, Malhar Rao Holkar (1694–1766) became leader of Maratha armies in Malwa in 1724, and in 1733 the Maratha Peshwa granted him control of most of the region, which was formally ceded by the Mughals in 1738. Ranoji Scindia, noted Maratha commander, established his headquarters at Ujjain in 1721.. This capital was later moved to Gwalior State by Daulatrao Scindia. Another Maratha general, Anand Rao Pawar, established himself as the Raja of Dhar in 1742, and the two Pawar brothers became Rajas of Dewas State.

At the end of the 18th century, Malwa became the venue of fighting between the rival Maratha powers and the headquarters of the Pindaris, who were irregular plunderers. The Pindaris were rooted out in a campaign by the British general Lord Hastings, and further order was established under Sir John Malcolm. The Holkar dynasty ruled Malwa from Indore and Maheshwar on the Narmada until 1818, when the Marathas were defeated by the British in the Third Anglo-Maratha War, and the Holkars of Indore became a princely state of the British Raj.

After 1818 the British organised the numerous princely states of central India into the Central India Agency; the Malwa Agency was a division of Central India, with an area of 23,100 km^{2} (8,900 sq mi) and a population of 1,054,753 in 1901. It comprised the states of Dewas State (senior and junior branch), Jaora, Ratlam, Sitamau and Sailana, together with a large part of Gwalior, parts of Indore and Tonk, and about 35 small estates and holdings. Political power was exercised from Neemuch.

Upon Indian independence in 1947, the Holkars and other princely rulers acceded to India, and most of Malwa became part of the new state of Madhya Bharat, which was merged into Madhya Pradesh in 1956.

== Geography ==
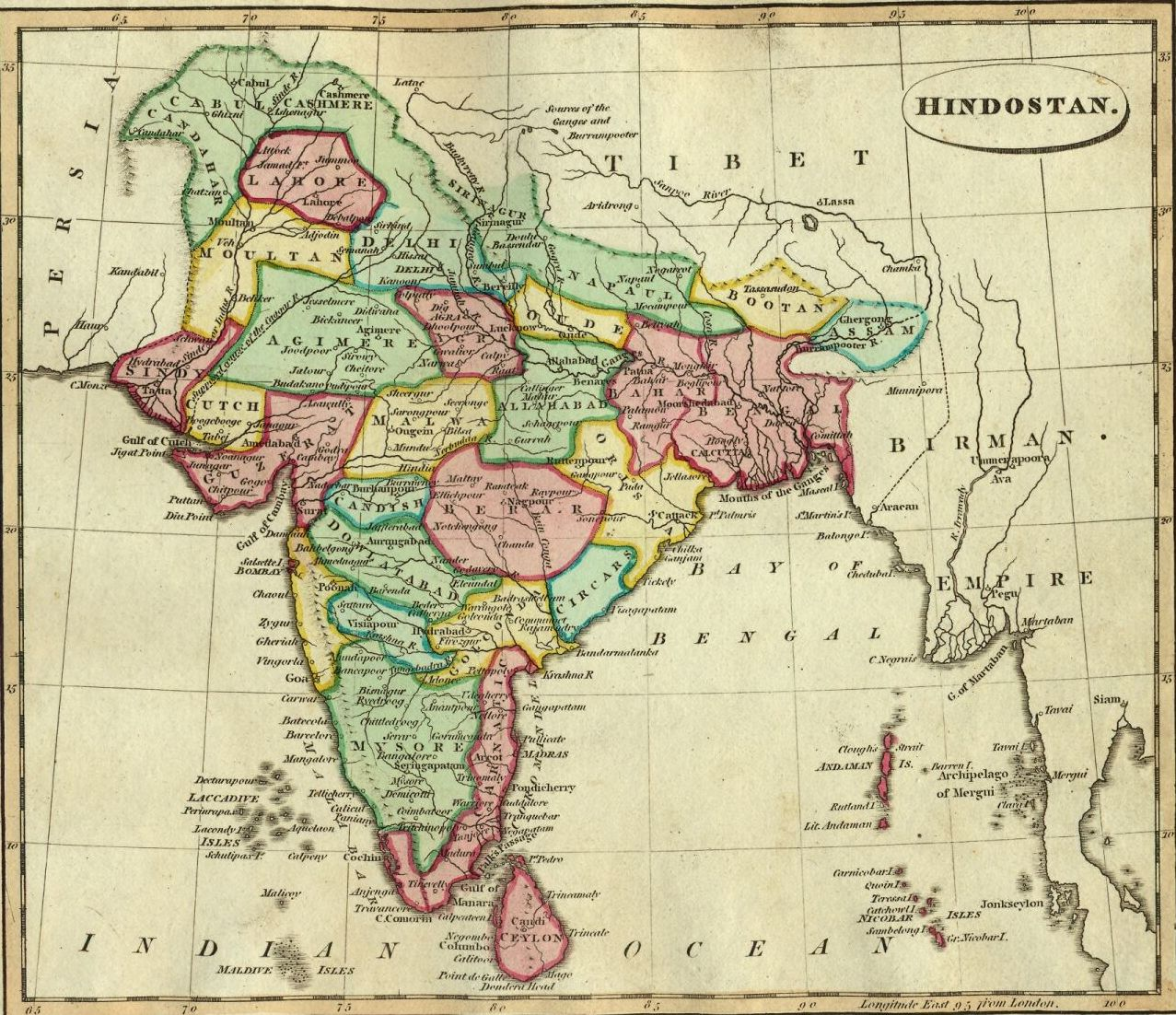
Malwa (central India, in yellow), as depicted in the Ostell's New General Atlas, 1814

The Malwa region occupies a plateau in western Madhya Pradesh and south-eastern Rajasthan (between 21°10′N 73°45′E and 25°10′N 79°14′E), with Gujarat in the west. The region includes the Madhya Pradesh districts of Agar, Dewas, Dhar, Indore, Jhabua, Mandsaur, Neemuch, Rajgarh, Ratlam, Shajapur, Ujjain, and parts of Guna and Sehore, and the Rajasthan districts of Jhalawar and parts of Kota, Banswara and Pratapgarh.

Malwa is bounded in the north-east by the Hadoti region, in the north-west by the Mewar region, in the west by the Vagad region and Gujarat. To the south and east is the Vindhya Range and to the north is the Bundelkhand upland.

The plateau is an extension of the Deccan Traps, formed between 60 and 68 million years ago at the end of the Cretaceous period. In this region the main classes of soil are black, brown and bhatori (stony) soil. The volcanic, clay-like soil of the region owes its black colour to the high iron content of the basalt from which it formed. The soil requires less irrigation because of its high capacity for moisture retention. The other two soil types are lighter and have a higher proportion of sand.

The average elevation of the plateau is 500 m. Some of the peaks over 800 m high are at Sigar (881 m), Janapav (854 m) and Ghajari (810 m). The plateau generally slopes towards the north. The western part of the region is drained by the Mahi River, while the Chambal River drains the central part, and the Betwa River and the headwaters of the Dhasan and Ken rivers drain the east. The Shipra River is of historical importance because of the Simhasth mela, held every 12 years. Other notable rivers are Parbati, Gambhir and Choti Kali Sindh.

Due to its altitude of about 550 to 600 meters above mean sea level, the region has comparatively cool evenings against the hot days during the summer season. Even if the day temperature reaches 42 to 43 degrees Celsius, the night temperatures are always in range of 20 to 22 degrees making the climate much cooler than the other areas of the region. The cool morning wind, the karaman, and an evening breeze, the Shab-e-Malwa, make the summers less harsh. The term Shab-e-Malwa, meaning dusk in Malwa (from shab, Urdu for night), was introduced by the Mughals.

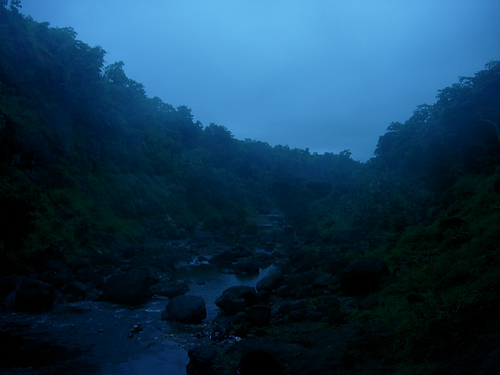
The Vindhya Range marks the southern boundary of the plateau, and is the source of many rivers of the region.

The year is popularly divided into three seasons: summer, the rains, and winter. Summer extends over the months of Chaitra to Jyestha (mid-March to mid-May). The average maximum temperature during the summer months is 37 °C, which typically rises to around 40 °C on a few days. The rainy season starts with the first showers of Aashaadha (mid-June) and extends to the middle of Ashvin (September). Most of the rain falls during the southwest monsoon spell, and ranges from about 80 cm in the west to about 10.5 cm in the east. Indore and the immediately surrounding areas receive an average of 90 cm of rainfall a year. The growing period lasts from 90 to 150 days, during which the average daily temperature is below 30 °C, but seldom falls below 20 °C. Winter is the longest of the three seasons, extending for about five months (mid-Ashvin to Phalgun, i.e., October to mid-March). The average daily minimum temperature ranges from 6 °C to 9 °C, though on some nights it can fall as low as 3 °C. Some cultivators believe that an occasional winter shower during the months of Pausha and Maagha—known as Mawta—is helpful to the early summer wheat and germ crops.

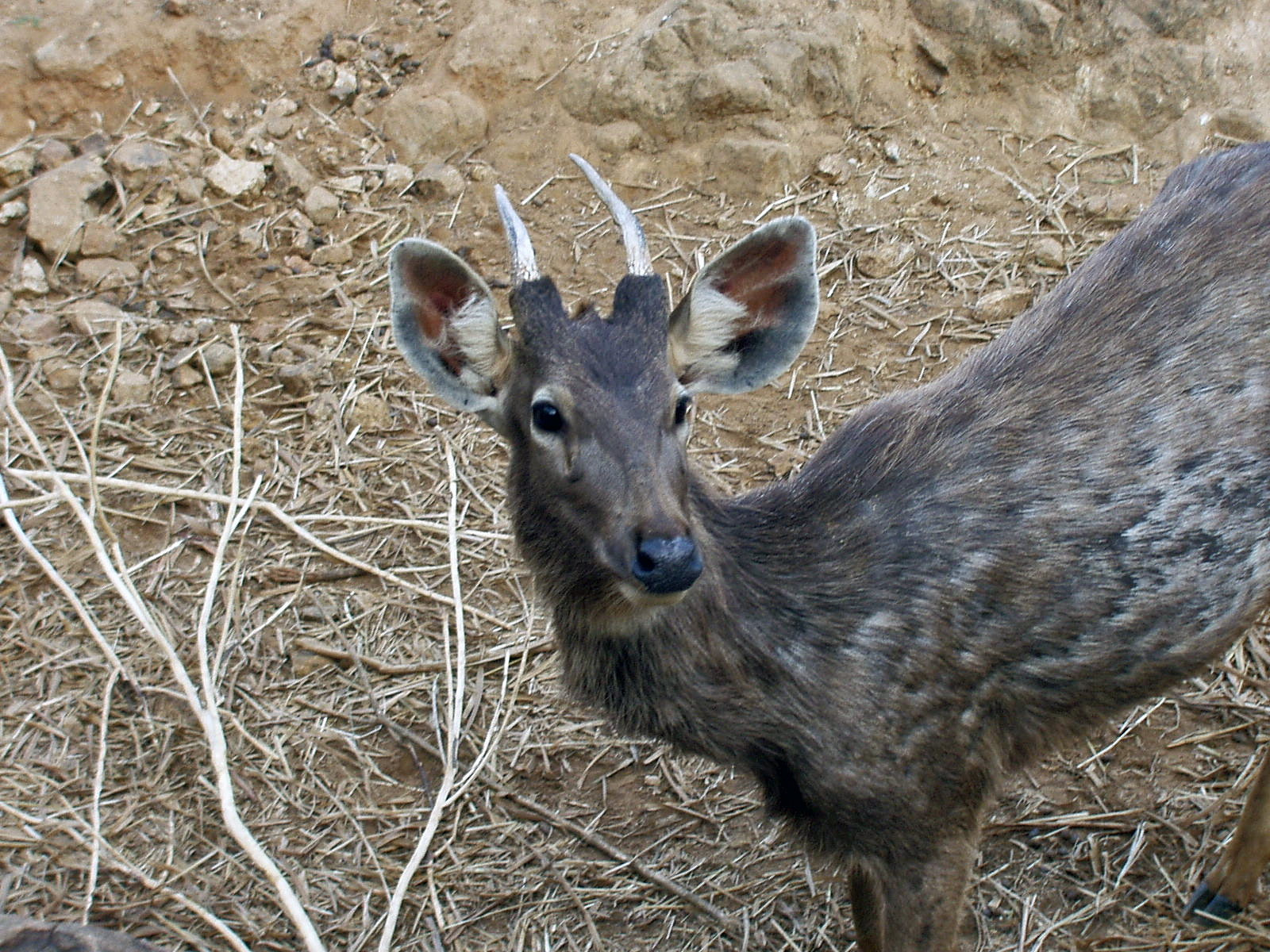
The Sambhar is one of the most common wild animals found in the region.

The region is part of the Khathiar-Gir dry deciduous forests ecoregion, Narmada valley dry deciduous forests, and Eastern Highlands moist deciduous forests.

Vegetation: The natural vegetation is tropical dry forest, with scattered teak (Tectona grandis) forests. The main trees are Butea, Bombax, Anogeissus, Acacia, Buchanania and Boswellia. The shrubs or small trees include species of Grewia, Ziziphus mauritiana, Casearia, Prosopis, Capparis, Woodfordia, Phyllanthus, and Carissa.

Wildlife: Sambhar (Cervus unicolor), Blackbuck (Antilope cervicapra), and Chinkara (Gazella bennettii) are some common ungulates. During the last century, deforestation has happened at a fast rate, leading to environmental problems such as acute water scarcity and the danger that the region is being desertified.

== Demographics ==
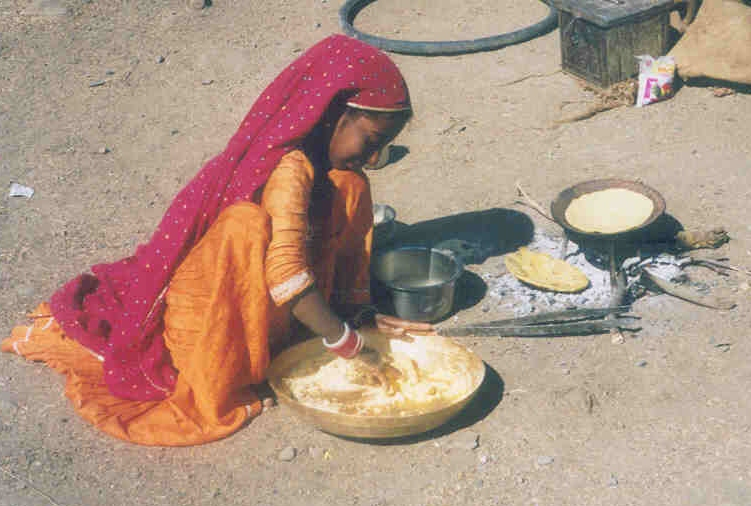
A girl from the Gadia Lohars nomadic tribe of Marwar, cooking on the outskirts of a village in Ratlam district

The population of the Malwa region was 22,773,993 in 2011, with a population density of a moderate 270/km^{2}. The annual birth rate in the region was 31.6 per 1000, and the death rate 10.3. The infant mortality rate was 93.8, slightly higher than the overall rate for the Madhya Pradesh state.

There are numerous tribes in the region, such as the Bhils—and their allied groups, the Meos the Bhilalas, Barelas and Patelias—and the Meenas, who all differ to a remarkable degree from the regional population in their dialects and social life. They encompass a variety of languages and cultures. Some tribes of the region, notably the Kanjars, were notified in the 19th century for their criminal activities, but have since been denotified. A nomadic tribe from the Marwar region of Rajasthan, the Gadia Lohars—who work as lohars (blacksmiths)—visit the region at the start of the agricultural season to repair and sell agricultural tools and implements, stopping temporarily on the outskirts of villages and towns and residing in their ornate metal carts. The Kalbelia is another nomadic tribe from Rajasthan that regularly visits the region.

=== Religion ===
Religion in Malwa (2011)
1. Hindu (89.0%)
2. Muslim (9.17%)
3. Others (1.80%)

Malwa has a significant number of Dawoodi Bohras, a subsect of Shia Muslims from Gujarat, who are mostly businessmen by profession. Besides speaking the local languages, the Bohras have their own language, Lisan al-Dawat. The Patidars, who Migrated from Gujarat settle in the Malwa-nimar. The Whole Malwa-Nimar belt is dominated by Patidar's who are large landowner's.

=== Languages ===
The most spoken language in the Malwa region is Malvi, which is the regional language, and Hindi is spoken in the cities. Marathi is also spoken considerably in the regions of Indore, Dhar, Dewas and Ujjain. A significant number of Marathas, Jats, Rajputs and Banias also live in the region. The Sindhis, who settled in the region after the partition of India, are an important part of the business community. Like southern Rajasthan, the region has a significant number of Jains, who are mostly traders and businesspeople. The region is home to smaller numbers of Goan Catholics, Anglo-Indians, Punjabis and Parsis or Zoroastrians. The Parsis are closely connected to the growth and evolution of Mhow, which has a Parsi fire temple and a Tower of Silence.

== Economy ==
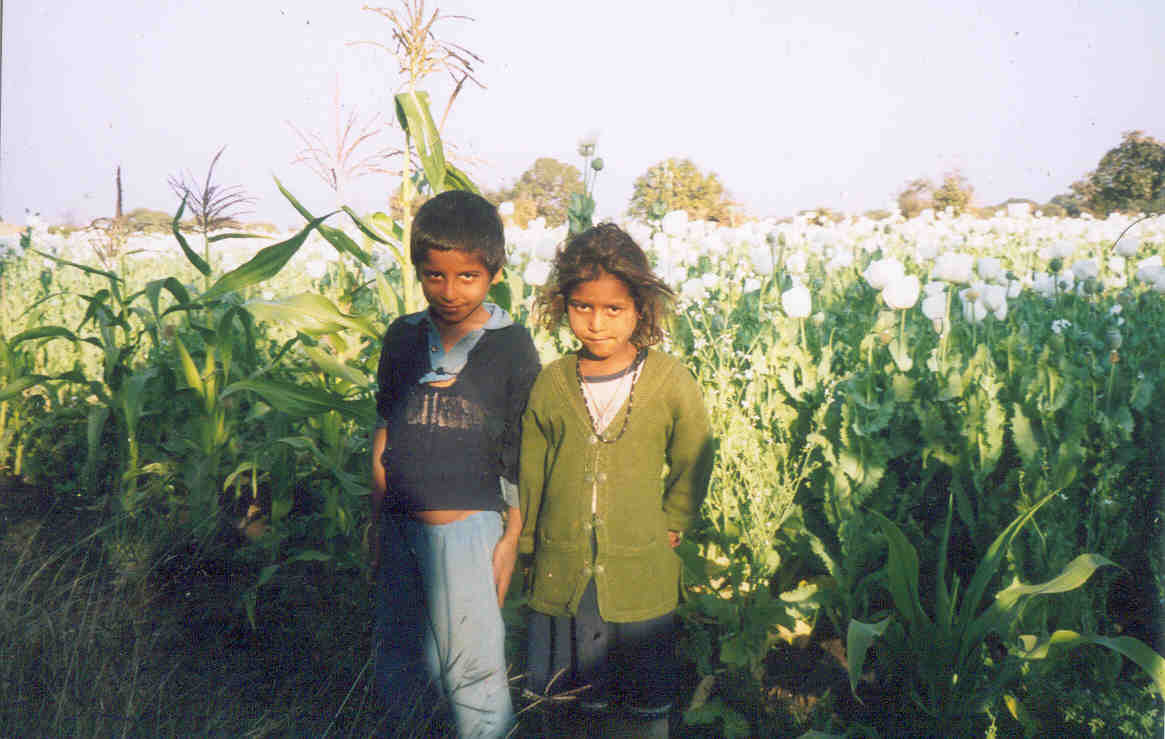
Children in an opium field in Malwa

Indore is the commercial capital of Malwa region and Madhya Pradesh as state. Malwa is one of the world's major opium producers. This crop resulted in development of close connections between the economies of Malwa, the western Indian ports and China, bringing international capital to the region in the 18th and 19th centuries. Malwa opium was a challenge to the monopoly of the British East India Company, which was supplying Bengal opium to China. This led the British company to impose many restrictions on the production and trade of the drug; eventually, opium trading was pushed underground (see Opium Trading in Mumbai for more information). When smuggling became rife, the British eased the restrictions. Today, the region is one of the largest producers of legal opium in the world. There is a central, government-owned opium and alkaloid factory in the city of Neemuch. Nevertheless, there is a still a significant amount of illicit opium production, which is channelled into the black market. The headquarters of India's Central Bureau of Narcotics is in Gwalior. The Rajputana-Malwa Railway was opened in 1876.

The region is predominantly agricultural. The brown soil in parts of the region is particularly suitable for the cultivation of such unalu (early summer) crops as wheat, gram (Cicer arietinum) and til (Sesamum indicum). Relatively poor soil is used for the cultivation of such syalu (early winter) crops as millet (Andropogon sorghum), maize (Zea mays), mung bean (Vigna radiata), urad (Vigna mungo), batla (Pisum sativum) and peanuts (Arachis hypogaea). Overall, the main crops are jowar, rice, wheat, coarse millet, peanuts and pulses, soya bean, cotton, linseed, sesame and sugarcane. Sugar mills are located in numerous small towns.

The black, volcanic soil is ideal for the cultivation of cotton, and textile manufacture is an important industry. Large centres of textile production include Indore, Ujjain and Nagda. Maheshwar is known for its fine Maheshwari saris, and Mandsaur for its coarse woollen blankets. Handicrafts are an important source of income for the tribal population. Coloured lacquerware from Ratlam, rag dolls from Indore, and papier-mâché articles from Indore, Ujjain and several other centres are well known.

Mandsaur district is the sole producer in India of white- and red-coloured slate, used in the district's 110 slate pencil factories. There is a cement factory in Neemuch. Apart from this, the region lacks mineral resources. The region's industries mainly produce consumer goods—but there are now many centres of large- and medium-scale industries, including Indore, Nagda and Ujjain. Indore has a large-scale factory that produces diesel engines. Pithampur, an industrial town 25 km from Indore, is known as the Detroit of India for its heavy concentration of automotive industry. Indore is recognised as the commercial capital of Madhya Pradesh, and is the main centre for trade in textiles and agro-based products. It has one of the six Indian Institutes of Management and one of sixteen Indian Institute of Technology.

== Culture ==
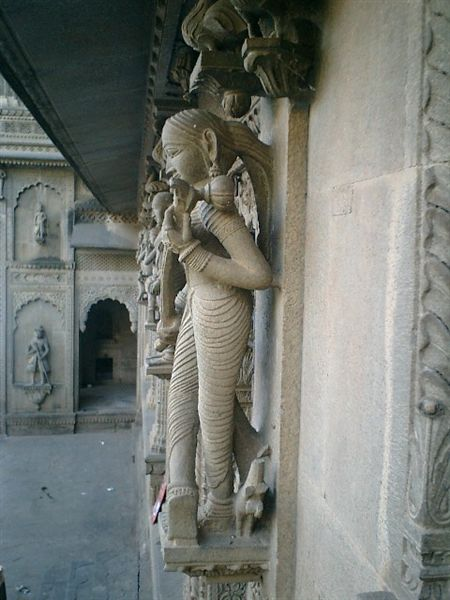
A Maratha-styled sculpture from Maheshwar

The culture of Malwa has been significantly influenced by Gujarati and Rajasthani culture, because of their geographic proximity. Marathi influence is also visible, because of recent rule by the Marathas.

The main language of Malwa is Malvi, although Hindi is widely spoken in the cities. This Indo-European language is subclassified as Indo-Aryan. The language is sometimes referred to as Malavi or Ujjaini. Malvi is part of the Rajasthani branch of languages; Nimadi is spoken in the Nimar region of Madhya Pradesh and in Rajasthan. The dialects of Malvi are, in alphabetical order, Bachadi, Pawari/Bhoyari in Betul, Chhindwara, Pandhurna and Wardha districts. Dholewari, Hoshangabadi, Jamral, Katiyai, Malvi Proper, Patvi, Rangari, Rangri and Sondwari. A survey in 2001 found only five dialects: Ujjaini (in the districts of Ujjain, Indore, Dewas, Dhar, Agar Malwa and Sehore), Rajawari (Ratlam, Mandsaur and Neemuch), Umathwari (Rajgarh) and Sondhwari (Jhalawar) and Bhoyari/Pawari (in the districts of Betul, Chhindwara, Pandhurna and Wardha). About 55% of the population of Malwa can converse in and about 40% of the population is literate in Hindi, the official language of the Madhya Pradesh state.

Traditional Malwa food has elements of Rajasthani, Gujarati and Maharashtrian cuisine. Traditionally, jowar was the staple cereal, but after the Green Revolution in India, wheat has replaced jowar as the most important food crop; many are vegetarians. Since the climate is mostly dry throughout the year, most people rely on stored foods such as pulses, and green vegetables are rare. A typical snack of Malwa is the bhutta ri kees (made with grated corn roasted in ghee and later cooked in milk with spices). Chakki ri shaak is made of wheat dough, which is washed under running water, steamed and then used in a gravy of curd. The traditional bread of Malwa is called baati/bafla, which is essentially a small, round ball of wheat flour, roasted over dung cakes, in the traditional way. Baati is typically eaten with dal (pulses), while baflas are dripping with ghee and soaked with dal. The amli ri kadhi is kadhi made with tamarind instead of yogurt. Sweet cakes, made of a variety of wheat called tapu, are prepared during religious festivities. Sweet cereal called thulli is also typically eaten with milk or yoghurt. Traditional desserts include mawa-bati (milk-based sweet similar to Gulab jamun), khoprapak (coconut-based sweet), shreekhand (yogurt based) and malpua.

Lavani is a widely practised form of folk music in southern Malwa, which was brought to the region by the Marathas. The Nirguni Lavani (philosophical) and the Shringari Lavani (erotic) are two of the main genres. The Bhils have their own folk songs, which are always accompanied by dance. The folk musical modes of Malwa are of four or five notes, and in rare cases six. The devotional music of the Nirguni cult is popular throughout Malwa. Legends of Raja Bhoj and Bijori, the Kanjar girl, and the tale of Balabau are popular themes for folk songs. Insertions known as stobha are commonly used in Malwa music; this can occur in four ways: the matra stobha (syllable insertion), varna stobha (letter insertion), shabda stobha (word insertion) and vakya stobha (sentence insertion).

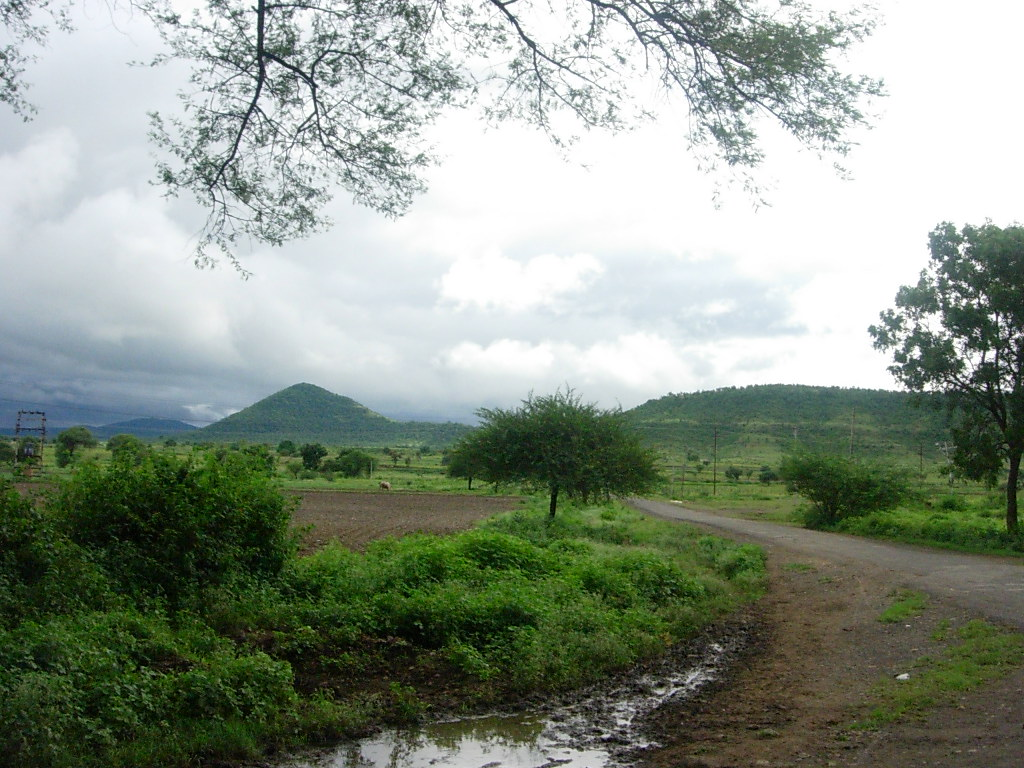
Typical countryside near Mhow during the monsoon season

Malwa was the centre of Sanskrit literature during and after the Gupta period. The region's most famous playwright, Kalidasa, is considered to be the greatest Indian writer ever. His first surviving play is Malavikagnimitra (Malavika and Agnimitra). Kalidasa's second play, his masterpiece, is the Abhijñānaśākuntalam, which tells the story of king Dushyanta, who falls in love with a girl of lowly birth, the lovely Shakuntala. The last of Kalidasa's surviving plays is Vikramuurvashiiya ("Urvashi conquered by valour"). Kalidasa also wrote the epic poems Raghuvamsha ("Dynasty of Raghu"), Ritusamhāra and Kumarasambhava ("Birth of the war god"), as well as the lyric Meghaduuta ("The cloud messenger").

Swang is a popular dance form in Malwa; its roots go back to the origins of the Indian theatre tradition in the first millennium BC. Since women did not participate in the dance-drama form, men enacted their roles. Swang incorporates suitable theatrics and mimicry, accompanied alternately by song and dialogue. The genre is dialogue-oriented rather than movement-oriented.

Mandana (literally painting) wall and floor paintings are the best-known painting traditions of Malwa. White drawings stand out in contrast to the base material consisting of a mixture of red clay and cow dung. Peacocks, cats, lions, goojari, bawari, the swastika and chowk are some motifs of this style. Sanjhya is a ritual wall painting done by young girls during the annual period when Hindus remember and offer ritual oblation to their ancestors. Malwa miniature paintings are well known for their intricate brushwork. In the 17th century, an offshoot of the Rajasthani school of miniature painting, known as Malwa painting, was centred largely in Malwa and Bundelkhand. The school preserved the style of the earliest examples, such as the Rasikapriya series dated 1636 (after a poem analysing the love sentiment) and the Amaru Sataka (a 17th-century Sanskrit poem). The paintings from this school are flat compositions on black and chocolate-brown backgrounds, with figures shown against a solid colour patch, and architecture painted in vibrant colours.

The biggest festival of Malwa is the Simhastha mela, held every 12 years, in which more than 40 million pilgrims take a holy dip in river Shipra. The festival of Gana-gour is celebrated in honour of Shiva and Parvati. The history of the festival goes back to Rano Bai, whose parental home was in Malwa, but who was married in Rajasthan. Rano Bai was strongly attached to Malwa, and did not want to stay in Rajasthan. After marriage, she was allowed to visit Malwa only once a year; Gana-gour symbolises these annual return visits. The festival is observed by women in the region once in the month of Chaitra (mid-March) and Bhadra (mid-August). The Ghadlya (earthen pot) festival is celebrated by the girls of the region, who gather to visit every house in their village in the evenings, carrying earthen pots with holes for the light from oil lamps inside to escape. In front of every house, the girls recite songs connected with the Ghadlya and receive food or money in return. The Gordhan festival is celebrated on the 16th day in the month of Kartika. The Bhils of the region sing Heeda, anecdotal songs to the cattle, while the women sing the Chandrawali song, associated with Krishna's romance.

The most popular fairs are held in the months of Phalguna, Chaitra, Bhadra, Ashvin and Kartik. The Chaitra fair, held at Biaora, and the Gal yatras, held at more than two dozen villages in Malwa are remarkable. Many fairs are held in the tenth day of the month of Bhadra to mark the birth of Tejaji. The Triveni mela is held at Ratlam, and other fairs take place in Kartika at Ujjain, Mandhata (Nimad), among others.

Muslim community of Malwa is headed by Mufti e Azam Malwa or Grand Mufti of Malwa, who follows Aala Hazrat Imam Ahmed Raza Khan (an important leader of Ahle Sunnat Wal Jamaat). He is considered as the supreme fatwa issuing authority of the region. Mufti Rizwanur-Rahman Faruqi was succeeded by his son in law Mufti Habeeb yar Khan. The current incumbent is Mufti Noorul Haq.

== Tourism ==
The main tourist destinations in Malwa are places of historical or religious significance. The river Shipra and the city of Ujjain have been regarded as sacred for thousands of years. The Mahakal Temple of Ujjain is one of the 12 jyotirlingas, literally meaning "pillars of light". Ujjain has over 100 other ancient temples, including Harsidhhi, Chintaman Ganesh, Gadh Kalika, Kaal Bhairava and Mangalnath. The Kalideh Palace, on the outskirts of the city, is a fine example of ancient Indian architecture. The Bhartrihari caves are associated with interesting legends. Since the fourth century BC, Ujjain has enjoyed the reputation of being India's Greenwich, as the Prime Meridian of the Hindu geographers. The observatory built by Jai Singh II is one of the four such observatories in India and features ancient astronomical devices. The Simhastha mela, celebrated every 12 years, starts on the full moon day in Chaitra (April) and continues into Vaishakha (May) until the next full moon day.

Mandu was originally the fort capital of the Parmar rulers. Towards the end of the 13th century, it came under the sway of the Sultans of Malwa, the first of whom named it Shadiabad (city of joy). It remained as the capital, and in it the sultans built exquisite palaces like the Jahaz Mahal and Hindola Mahal, ornamental canals, baths and pavilions. The massive Jami Masjid and Hoshang Shah's tomb provided inspiration to the designers of the Taj Mahal centuries later. Baz Bahadur built a huge palace in Mandu in the 16th century. Other notable historical monuments are Rewa Kund, Rupmati's Pavilion, Nilkanth Mahal, Hathi Mahal, Darya Khan's Tomb, Dai ka Mahal, Malik Mughit is Mosque and Jali Mahal.

Close to Mandu is Maheshwar, a town on the northern bank of Narmada River that served as the capital of the Indore state under Ahilyabai Holkar. The Maratha rajwada (fort) is the main attraction. A life-size statue of Rani Ahilya sits on a throne within the fort complex. Dhar was the capital of Malwa before Mandu became the capital in 1405. There, the fort is in ruins but offers a panoramic view. The Bhojashala temple (built-in 1400) is still used as a place of worship on Tuesday. Dhar is also a birthplace of Raja Bhoj. Dhar people named as Dharwasi.

Modern Indore was planned and built by Ahilyabai Holkar. The grand Lal Baag Palace is one of its grandest monuments. The Bada Ganpati temple houses what is possibly the largest Ganesh idol in the world, measuring 7.6 m from crown to foot. The Kanch Mandir is a Jain temple entirely inlaid with glass. The Town Hall was made in 1904 in the indo-gothic style; originally named King Edward Hall, it was renamed Mahatma Gandhi Hall in 1948. The chhatris are the tombs or cenotaphs erected in memory of dead Holkar rulers and their family members.

The shrine of Hussain Tekri, built by the Nawab of Jaora, Mohammad Iftikhar Ali Khan Bahadur, in the 19th century, is on the outskirts of Jaora in the Ratlam district. Mohammad Iftikhar Ali Khan Bahadur was buried in the same graveyard where Hussain Tekri was buried. During the month of Moharram, thousands of people from all over the world visit the shrine of Hazrat Imam Hussain there, which is a replica of the Iraqi original. The place is famous for the rituals called Hajri to cure mental illness.

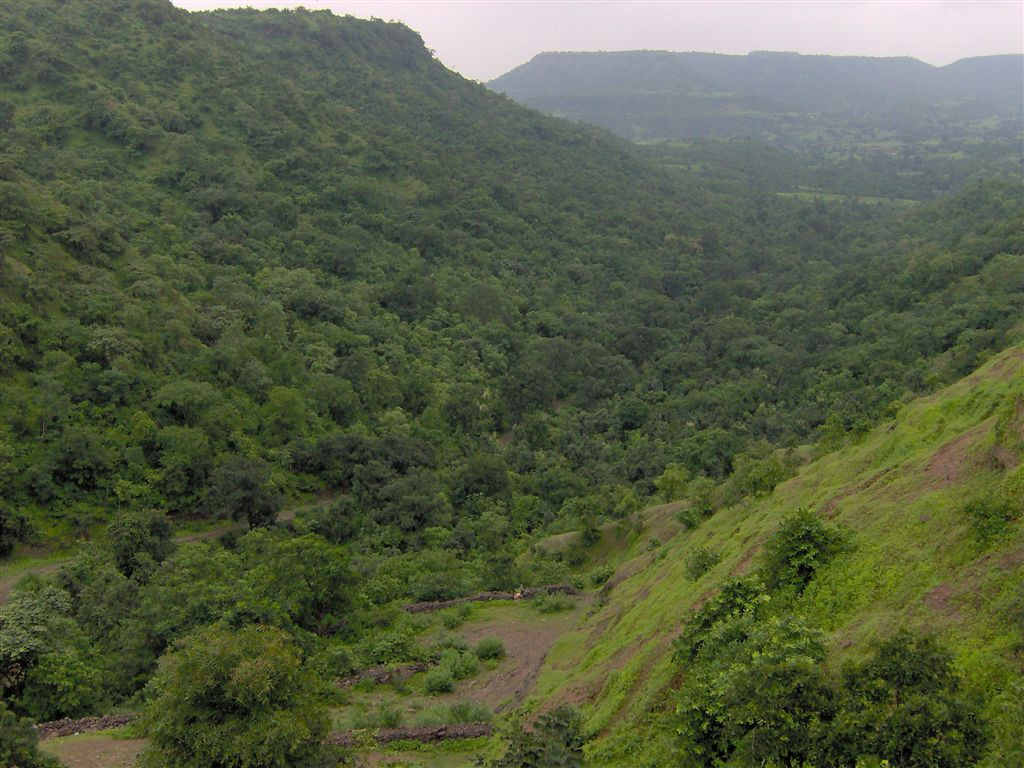
Mandu Valley

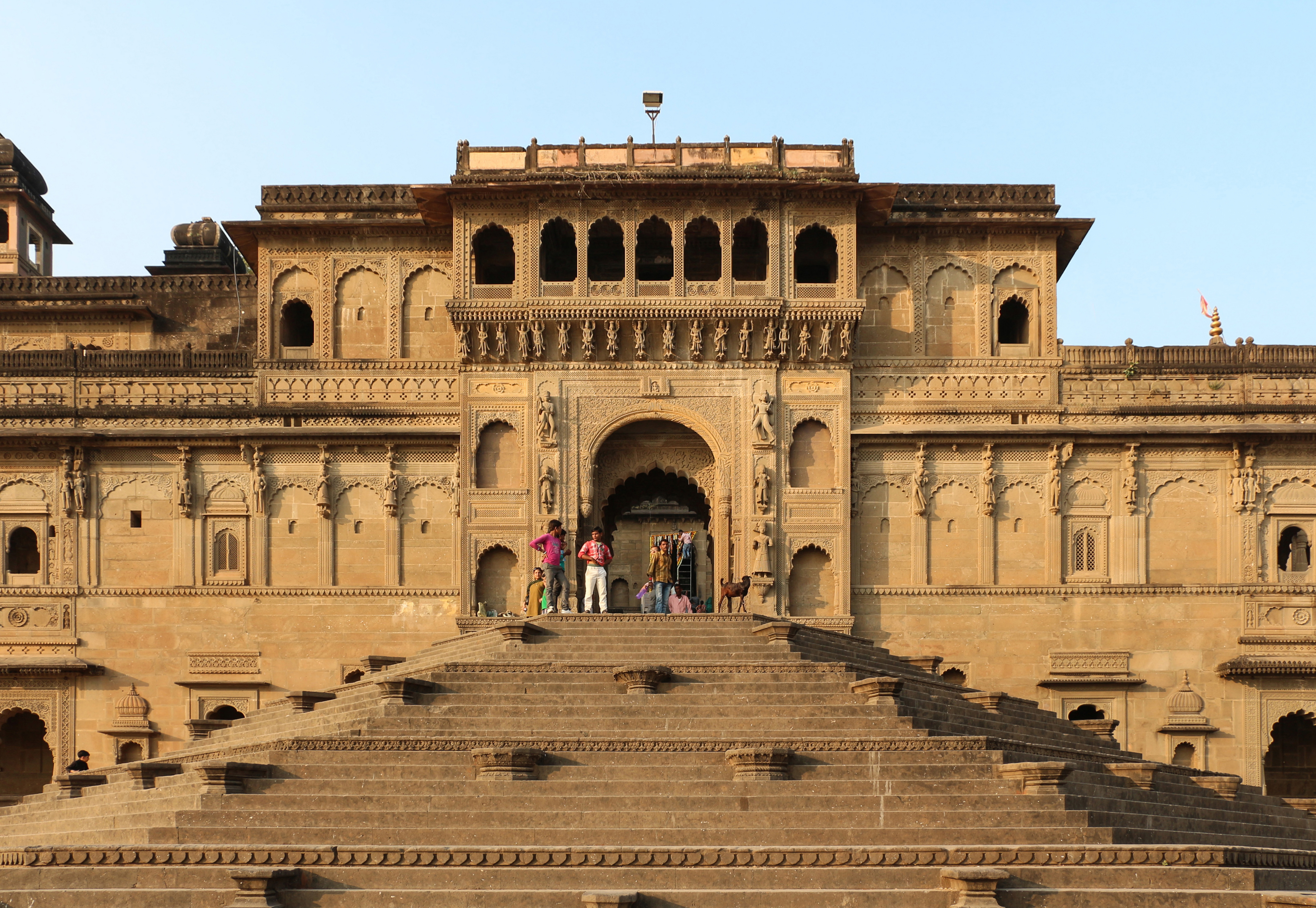
Maheshwar Fort (exterior)

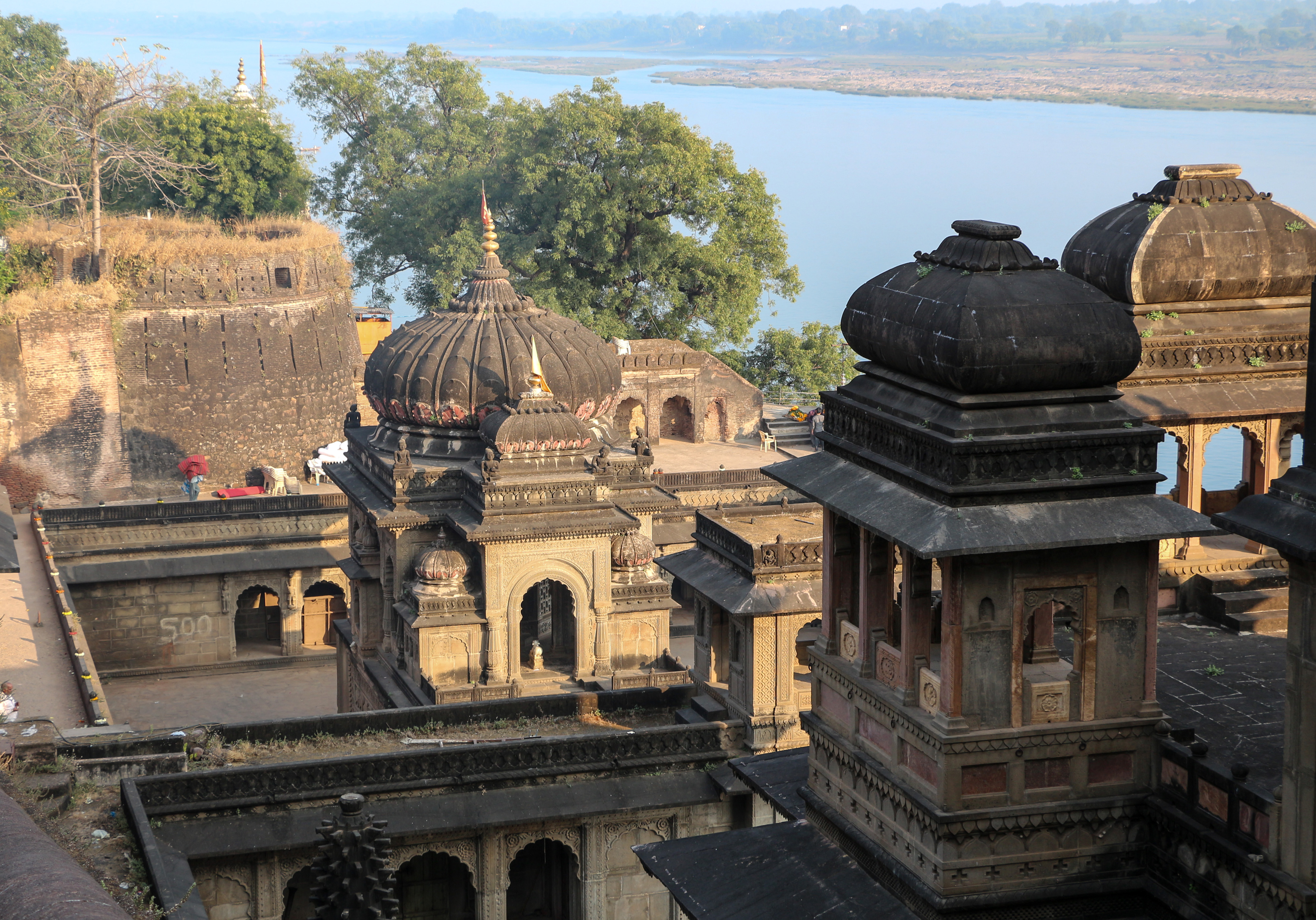
Maheshwar Fort (interior)

== Sports ==
Cricket is one of the most popular sports in the region. Indore is also home to the Madhya Pradesh Cricket Association. The city has two international cricket ground, the Holkar Cricket Stadium. The first cricket ODI match in state was played in Indore at Nehru Stadium, Indore.

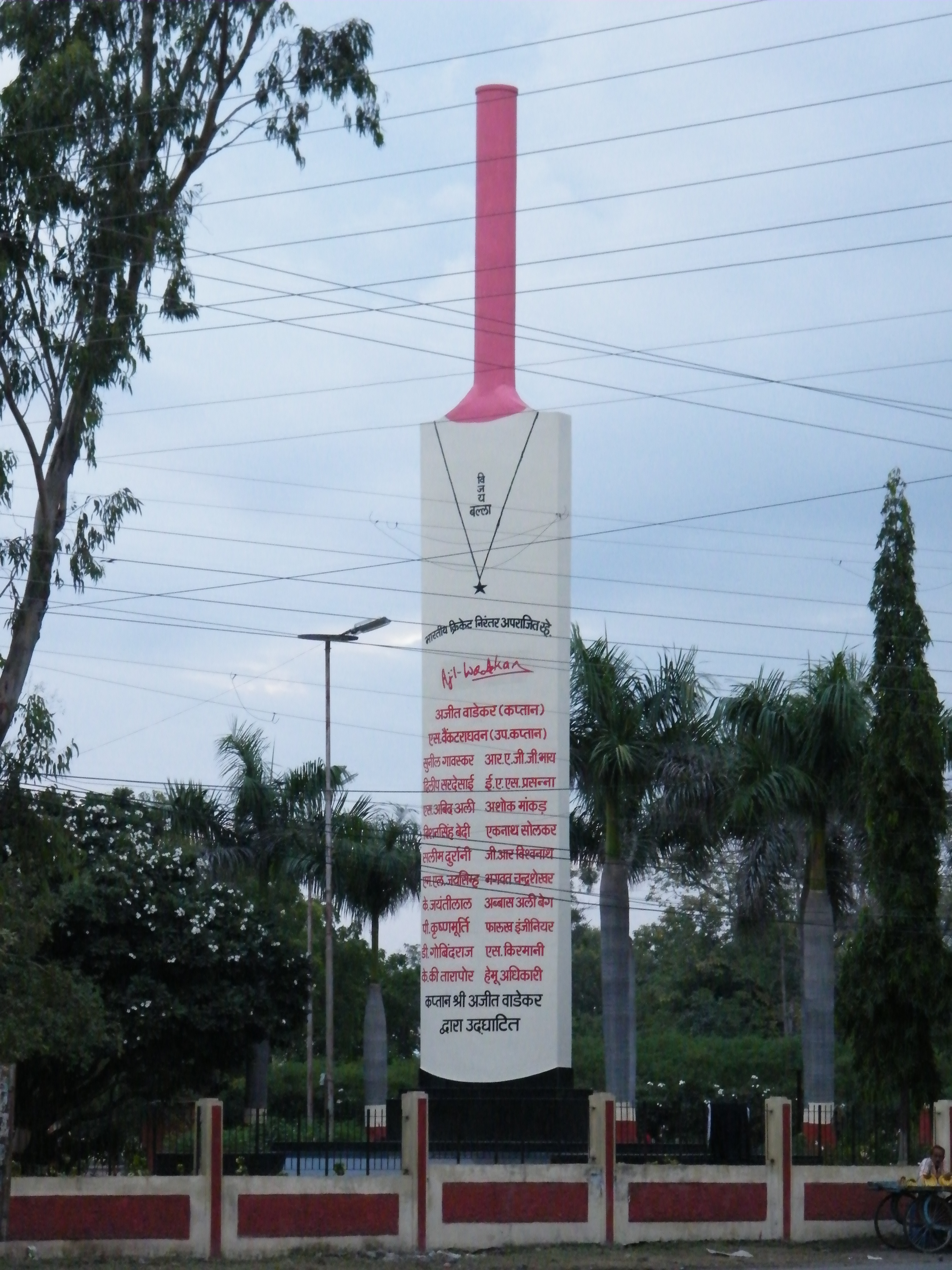
The Vijay Balla ("Victory Bat") made out of concrete with names of the players of the Indian team who won the test series against England (1971) and West Indies(1972)

=== Venues ===
No.	Venue	City	Sport	Capacity
1	Holkar Cricket Stadium	Indore	Cricket	30,000
2	Nehru International Cricket Stadium	Indore	Cricket	25,000
3	Indore Sports Complex	Indore	Cricket	50,000
4	Abhay Khel Prashal	Indore	Indoor Sports	500
5	Indore Tennis Club	Indore	Lawn Tennis	500
6	Emerald High School Ground	Indore	Cricket	500
7	Daly College	Indore	Field hockey, Football, Cricket	500 each

== Demands for statehood ==
There have been demands for a separate Malwa state with the probable capital at Indore. The region includes the Madhya Pradesh districts of Dewas, Mandsaur, Neemuch, Ratlam, Shajapur, Agar, Ujjain, Indore, Barwani, Burhanpur, Dhar, Jhabua, Khandwa, Khargone, Alirajpur and Rajgarh.

== See also ==
- Madhya Bharat
- List of people from Malwa

== Bibliography ==
- Gopinath Sharma (1954). Mewar & the Mughal Emperors (1526–1707 A.D.). S.L. Agarwala.
- Chaurasia, Radhey Shyam (2002). History of Medieval India: From 1000 A.D. to 1707 A.D. Atlantic Publishers & Dist. ISBN 978-81-269-0123-4.
