= Indore Fashion Week =

Blenders Pride Indore Fashion Week (BPIFW)
- BPIFW Summer 2014
- Genre: Fashion Week
- Frequency: Annual
- Location: Indore
- Inaugurated: March 2012
- Previous event: March 2013
- Next event: March 2014
- Patrons: Storm Fashion Company; Blenders Pride

Indore Fashion Week (IFW) is an annual fashion event that takes place in Indore. It is considered a premier fashion event in central India. It is run by Storm Fashion Company (SFC) and the title sponsor is Blenders Pride.

== Indore Fashion Week 2012 ==
Organised by Storm Fashion Company, Pernod Ricard India and Hotel Sayaji, the first Blenders Pride Indore Fashion Week saw participation from both established and emerging designers from across the country, including biggies like Jattinn Kochhar and Rocky S. Fifty models, including the show's brand ambassadors Shawar Ali and Miss Asia Pacific World 2012 Himangini Singh Yadu, were the style ambassadors for the fashion week. The shows was choreographed and directed by Former Miss India Priyanka Shah and Renu Sukheja.

BPIFW featured the collection of designers from all over India. There were three shows each day. Designers from Indore, Hyderabad, Bangalore, Delhi, Mumbai, and Cochin showcased their collections, mostly on bridal themes.

The Spring Summer edition of the Blenders Pride Indore Fashion Week 2013 took place from 6 to 10 March which saw a number of high-profile designers like Rocky S., Jatinn Kochhar, Riyaz Ganji, Poonam Vora, Sanjana Jon and many more from Dubai, New York City, Mumbai and Delhi participating. Many of the designers had show-stoppers to add that extra edge of glamour to their shows. Famous models like Kashmera Shah, Zulfi Syed, Simran Kaur as well as Indian film stars such as Mugdha Godse, Ziah Khan, Payal Rohatgi and Sangram Singh have participated in the BPIFW, 2013.

The fashion week displayed diverse collections ranging from heavy Indian/Bridal wear to lustrous western designs. The week was aimed at involving the discerning and ever evolving Indore crowd with the latest trends in fashion. On the first day of the event, around 40 models walked the ramp displaying western, ethnic and Indian Bridal Wear. The second day of the event showcased some of the dresses made from Madhya Pradesh's handwork including Begham and Anarkali Collection. The last day were dedicated to summer collections of three fashion designers from Indore, New York City and Mumbai with their creations on ramp.

== Indore Fashion Week 2014 ==
IFW, 2014 was organized at Radisson Blu, Indore from 21 to 23 March 2014. A robust line-up of 9 designers participated in the event.

== Criticism ==
The BPIFW, 2013 was a success and received well response by media and audience but the few local designers and models made it an issue of criticism among local fashion fraternity of Indore. The large participation of international fashion designers, film actors and models from Delhi, Mumbai and Kolkata disappointed local models and designers though the fashion week was concluded with a thumbs up from audience and media.

== See also ==
- India Fashion Week
- Lakme Fashion Week
- List of people from Indore
