= List of people from Malwa =

The following list includes notable people who were born or have lived in the region of Malwa, India.

== Historical ==
- Bhartrihari (570–651?)
- Bhāskara II (1114–1185), mathematician
- Bhoj (1010–1060), king
- Brahmagupta (598–668), mathematician
- Dhanvantari
- Malhar Rao Holkar, Holkar dynasty founder and first Maratha Empire subedar Madhya Bharat
- Rajmata Ahilya Devi Holkar, ruler of Indore state of the Holkars
- Kalidasa (c. 100? BC – c. 400? AD), Sanskrit playwright
- Mahinda, Buddhist monk depicted in Buddhist sources as bringing Buddhism to Sri Lanka; first-born son of the Mauryan emperor Ashoka from his wife Devi
- Sanghamitra, daughter of Emperor Ashoka and his wife, Vidisha Dev
- Siddhasena
- Varahamihira (505–587), astronomer and mathematician
- Chandragupta Vikramaditya (375–415), legendary king

== Artists and literary figures ==
- Digvijay Bhonsale (born 1989), rock/metal musician, lead vocalist/guitarist of Nicotine, metal band from Indore; studied at Daly College, Indore and Cardiff Metropolitan University, UK
- Hafeez Contractor, architect of India; born in Mumbai
- Asghar Ali Engineer, graduated with a degree in civil engineering from Vikram University
- Sagarika Ghatge, Indian film actress; daughter of the actor Vijayendra Ghatge
- Vijayendra Ghatge, actor in the Hindi film industry; son of Sita Raje Ghatge, who was the daughter of Maharaja Tukojirao Holkar III of Indore (reigned 1903–1926)
- Umakant Gundecha and Ramakant Gundecha, leading Dagarvani dhrupad singers
- M.F. Husain, eminent painter; spent his childhood in Indore
- Rahat Indori, Urdu poet and songwriter in Hindi films
- Celina Jaitley, Shimla-born Indian actress; mainly appears in Bollywood films; her parents live in the army town of Mhow in the Indore district
- Ustad Amir Khan (born 1912), Hindustani classical vocalist; referred to his unique style of khyal singing as "Indore Gharana"; born in Indore
- Rais Khan (born 1938), Indian sitar maestro; born in Indore
- Salman Khan, Indian film actor who appears in Bollywood movies; born in Indore
- Shahbaz Khan, television actor, known for his role in Chandrakanta as Kunwar Virendra Singh; son of Ustad Amir Khan, born and raised in Indore
- Zakir Khan, stand-up comedian
- Sneha Khanwalkar, Indian music director who works in Bollywood; brought up in Indore
- Swanand Kirkire, lyricist, singer, and writer; born in Indore
- Kiran Kumar, Mumbai-based Kashmiri Indian actor; studied at Daly College, Indore
- Kishore Kumar, playback singer and actor; belonged to Khandwa; studied at the Indore Christian College and used to stay in the hostel
- Ankita Lokhande, Indian television actress; brought up in Indore
- Lata Mangeshkar, playback singer, born in Indore to Pandit Dinanath Mangeshkar
- Mantra, RJ, actor, comedian; born and raised in Indore
- Palak Muchhal, Indian singer, born in Indore
- Sachida Nagdev, contemporary Indian artist
- Pradeep (1915–1998), Indian poet and songwriter who is best known for his patriotic song "Aye Mere Watan Ke Logo"
- Kunwar Amarjeet Singh, hip-hop and contemporary style dancer; played lead role in Dil Dosti Dance
- Prahlad Tipanya, Kabir folksinger from Lunyakheri village; recipient of the Sangeet Natak Akademi award
- Mahadevi Varma, Hindi poet; freedom fighter; was married to Dr Swarup Narain Varma in Indore
- Johnny Walker, famous comic actor; born in Indore

== Rulers, nationalists, and politicians ==
- B.R. Ambedkar, 'father' of the Indian Constitution; campaigner for Dalit rights; born in Mhow
- Field Marshal K. M. Cariappa, first Indian commander-in-chief of the Indian Army; studied at Daly College Indore
- Yashoda Devi, first woman to be elected from a former princely state of India as a member of a legislative assembly
- Thawar Chand Gehlot, cabinet minister in the Ministry of Social Justice and Empowerment in Narendra Modi government
- Devi Ahilya Bai Holkar, most noted ruler of Holker State; built numerous temples, wells and dharamshalas all over India; spent most of her life in Maheshwar, then capital of the Holkars, situated on the banks of the Narmada; is said to have visited Indore only twice in her lifetime, but her name is synonymous with Indore, and the university and airport are named after her
- Maharaja Yashwantrao Holkar, key figure in Maratha history; galvanized several years of resistance against the British Empire; was called the 'Napoleon of India'
- Yeshwantrao Holkar II (born 1908), the Maharaja of Indore belonging to the Holkar dynasty of the Marathas; born in Indore
- Paras Chandra Jain, leader of Bharatiya Janata Party
- Satyanarayan Jatiya, former cabinet minister from 1999 to 2004 and held portfolios of labour and social justice and empowerment
- Ajit Jogi, first chief minister of the state of Chhattisgarh; District Magistrate of Indore in the 1980s
- Prabhash Joshi, journalist; editor in chief of Jansatta (The Indian Express group)
- Hukam Chand Kachwai, leader of Bharatiya Janata Party
- Guru Radha Kishan, Swatantrata Sangram Sainik, fought for the economic deprivation for the poor and the issues of social deprivation
- Sumitra Mahajan, Bharatiya Janata Party leader and MP; member of Parliament from Indore Lok Sabha constituency since 1989
- Field Marshal Sam Bahadur Manekshaw, commandant of the Infantry School, Mhow during the 1950s
- Jyotiraditya Scindia, Indian politician, former president of MPCA, Hereditary Patron of Daly College, Indore
- Prakash Chandra Sethi, Indian National Congress politician; chief minister of Madhya Pradesh, was the member of Parliament from Indore Lok Sabha constituency (1984–1989); served in a number of positions in the centre, including home minister, defence minister, minister of external affairs, finance minister, railways, and housing and development
- Digvijay Singh, Indian politician; former chief minister of Madhya Pradesh; senior leader of the Indian National Congress political party; studied at Daly College in Indore; alumnus of Shri Govindram Seksaria Institute of Technology and Science, Indore
- Pushpa Devi Singh, Indian politician
- Sartaj Singh, PWD minister in government of Madhya Pradesh
- Kaptan Singh Solanki, Indian politician of the Bharatiya Janata Party
- General K. Sundarji, commandant of the College of Combat, Mhow (now known as Army War College) during the early 1980s
- Kailash Vijayvargiya, leader of Bharatiya Janata Party; ex-mayor of Indore

== Sports persons ==
- Sandhya Agarwal, former captain of Indian women's cricket team
- Captain Mushtaq Ali, Colonel Nayudu's teammate in the Holkar team and in the Indian team; popularly known as the 'Errol Flynn' of Indian cricket
- Captain Syed Mushtaq Ali (1914–2005), Indian international cricketer; born and died in Indore
- Minoti Desai (born 1968), Indian cricketer; represented Indian women's team; born in Indore
- Rahul Dravid, Indian cricketer; former captain of the Indian cricket; born in Indore
- Raj Singh Dungarpur, former president of the Board of Control for Cricket in India; former Indian cricket selector, an ex-student of Daly College, Indore
- Narendra Hirwani, leg spin bowler; former member of Indian cricket team; moved to Indore when he was a teenager
- Sanjay Jagdale, former state cricketer; presently one of the national selectors for the senior all-India teams and the honorary secretary of the Madhya Pradesh Cricket Association; director of the Cricket Club of Indore
- Amay Khurasiya, former member of Indian Cricket team; studied in Indore
- Shankar Lakshman (1933–2006), goalkeeper of the Indian hockey team in the 1956, 1960 and 1964 Olympics and won two golds and a silver; captain of the team which won the gold in the 1966 Asian Games; belonged to Mhow and lived his retired life here until his death
- Colonel C.K. Nayudu, first Indian Test captain in cricket; led India between 1932 and 1934
- Mir Ranjan Negi, hockey goalkeeper and coach of Indian women's team; won Asian Championship
- Naman Ojha, Indian cricketer
- Chandu Sarwate (died in 2003), former Indian cricketer and former Indian cricket selector; lived and died in Indore
- Jalaj Saxena (born 1986), cricketer; plays as an all rounder for the India A cricket team; born in Indore

== Academia, business and professionals ==
- Deepak Chaurasia, journalist, editor in chief of India News
- Seth Hukumchand, known as the 'cotton prince of India' and had much credit even in some overseas countries
- Dr S Prakash Tiwari, former vice-chancellor of S. K. Rajasthan Agricultural University, Bikaner, and former director of National Academy of Agricultural Research Management, Hyderabad
- Siddhartha Paul Tiwari, academician and researcher, India Science Award recipient

== See also ==
- List of people of Indore, the largest city of Malwa
