= List of people from Indore =

List of notable people of Indore

The following list includes notable individuals who were born or have lived in Indore, India, or its surrounding towns and areas.

== Rulers, politicians and nationalists ==
- Rajesh Agarwal, deputy mayor of London for business, born in indore
- Afroz Ahmad, member in Indian government appointed by prime minister of India
- Dr. Bhimrao Ambedkar, chairperson of Drafting Committee of Indian Constitution, social reformer, born in Mhow, District of Indore
- Field Marshal K. M. Cariappa, first Indian commander-in-chief of the Indian Army; studied at Daly College, Indore
- Homi F. Daji, member of the 3rd Lok Sabha of India; represented the Indore constituency of Madhya Pradesh and was a member of the Communist Party of India
- Ahilyabai Holkar, ruler of Holkar State; built numerous temples, wells and dharamshalas all over India; spent most of her life in Maheshwar, then capital of the Holkars; is said to have visited Indore only twice in her lifetime, but her name is synonymous with Indore and the university and airport are named after her
- Yashwant Rao Holkar II (born 1908), the Maharaja of Indore belonging to the Holkar dynasty of the Marathas; born in Indore
- Maharaja Yashwantrao Holkar, key figure in Maratha history; galvanized several years of resistance against the British Empire; called the 'Napoleon of India'
- Ajit Jogi, first chief minister of Chhattisgarh; district magistrate of Indore in the 1980s
- Prabhash Joshi, journalist, editor in chief of Jansatta (The Indian Express group)
- Guru Radha Kishan, Swatantrata Sangram Sainik, fought for the economic deprivation for the poor and issues of social deprivation
- Sumitra Mahajan, Bharatiya Janata Party (BJP) leader and MP; member of Parliament from Indore Lok Sabha constituency since 1989 and lok sabha speaker
- Field Marshal Sam Manekshaw, commandant of the Infantry School, Mhow during the 1950s
- Ramesh Mendola, Bharatiya Janata Party (BJP) leader and MLA; member of Legislative Assembly from Indore-2 (Vidhan Sabha constituency) since 2008
- Satyanarayan Patel, senior leader of Indian National Congress party
- Jyotiraditya Scindia, Indian politician, former president of MPCA, hereditary patron of Daly College, Indore
- Prakash Chandra Sethi, Indian National Congress politician; chief minister of Madhya Pradesh; member of Parliament from Indore Lok Sabha constituency (1984–1989); served in a number of positions in the Centre, including home minister, defence minister, minister of external affairs, finance minister, railways, and housing and development
- Digvijaya Singh, Indian politician; former chief minister of Madhya Pradesh; senior leader of the Indian National Congress political party; studied at Daly College in Indore; alumnus of Shri Govindram Seksaria Institute of Technology and Science, Indore
- General Krishnaswamy Sundarji, commandant of the College of Combat, Mhow (now known as Army War College) during the early 1980s
- Air Chief Marshal Shashindra Pal Tyagi, chief of the Air Staff of the Indian Air Force, 2004–2007
- Kailash Vijayvargiya, leader of Indore BJP, currently serving as general secretary of the BJP

== Artists, writers and literary figures ==
- Kunwar Amar, hip-hop and contemporary style dancer; played lead role in Dil Dosti Dance
- Shubhangi Atre, Indian television actor, had a lead role in Bhabhiji Ghar par hai, born and brought up in Indore
- Digvijay Bhonsale (born 1989), rock/metal musician, lead vocalist/guitarist of Nicotine, metal band from Indore; studied at Daly College, Indore and Cardiff Metropolitan University, UK
- Meghdeep Bose, Indian music composer, producer, arranger and singer
- Puru Dadheech, Padma Shri, Kathak scholar, dancer; holder of the first doctorate in Kathak classical dance in the world; attended high school in Indore and returned to settle since 1988
- Vijayendra Ghatge, actor in the Hindi film industry; studied at Daly College, son of Sita Raje Ghatge, who was the daughter of Maharaja Tukojirao Holkar III of Indore (reigned 1903–1926)
- Hussain Haidry, poet, writer and lyricist; born and brought up in Indore; studied at Indian Institute of Management Indore and Government Arts and Commerce College, Indore
- M. F. Husain, painter; spent his struggling years in Indore
- Rahat Indori, Urdu poet and songwriter in Hindi films
- Celina Jaitly (born 1981), Indian actress born in Shimla who mostly appears in Bollywood films
- Ustaad Amir Khan (born 1912), celebrated Hindustani classical vocalist; referred to his unique style of khyal singing as "Indore Gharana"; born in Indore
- Rais Khan (born 1938), Indian sitar maestro; born in Indore
- Salman Khan (born 1965), Indian film actor; Bollywood actor; born in Indore
- Shahbaz Khan, television actor, known for his role in Chandrakanta as Kunwar Virendra Singh; son of Ustad Amir Khan, born and raised in Indore
- Sneha Khanwalkar, Indian music director; works in Bollywood; was brought up in Indore
- Swanand Kirkire, lyricist-singer-writer, born in Indore
- Zakir Khan, stand-up comedian
- Kiran Kumar, Mumbai-based Kashmiri Indian actor; studied at Daly College, Indore
- Kishore Kumar, playback singer and actor; belonged to Khandwa; studied at the Indore Christian College and used to stay in the hostel
- Lata Mangeshkar, playback singer; born in Indore to Pandit Dinanath Mangeshkar
- Mantra, RJ, actor, comedian; born and raised in Indore
- Bhalu Mondhe (born 1944), Padma Shri awardee photographer, artist and environmentalist who played an important role in restoring the Sirpur Lake, an important bird habitat and a Ramsar site
- Praveen Morchhale, filmmaker, educated in Indore
- Palak Muchhal, Indian playback singer; born and brought up in Indore
- Palash Muchhal, musical composer; born and brought up in Indore
- Kumar Pallana (1918–2013), Hollywood and Bollywood film actor, juggler, balance artist, teacher, yogi
- Mahadevi Varma, Hindi poet; freedom fighter; was married to Dr Swarup Narain Varma in Indore
- Johnny Walker, comedy actor; born in Indore

== Sportspersons and athletes ==
- Sandhya Agarwal, former captain of Indian women's cricket team
- Captain Syed Mushtaq Ali (1914–2005), Indian international cricketer; Colonel Nayudu's teammate in the Holkar team and in the Indian team; popularly known as the 'Errol Flynn' of Indian cricket; born and died in Indore
- Minoti Desai (born 1968), Indian cricketer, represented Indian women's team; born in Indore
- Rahul Dravid, Indian cricketer and former cricket captain; born in Indore
- Raj Singh Dungarpur, former president of the Board of Control for Cricket in India; former Indian cricket selector; ex-student of Daly College, Indore
- Sydney Greve (1925–2015), prominent Anglo-Indian two-time Olympian representing Pakistan, played in the 1952 Olympics and the 1948 Olympics
- Narendra Hirwani, leg spin bowler and former member of Indian cricket team; moved to Indore as a teenager
- Sanjay Jagdale, former state cricketer; presently a national selectors for the senior all-India teams and the honorary secretary of the Madhya Pradesh Cricket Association; director of the Cricket Club of Indore
- Akshat Khamparia (born 1989), an Indian chess International Master; first player from Central India to hold an 'International Master' title
- Venkatesh Iyer, cricketer, played for Indian team for some months, born in Indore
- Avesh Khan, cricketer, born in Indore
- Arundhati Kirkire, born and brought up in Indore who played for the Indian women's cricket team
- Shankar Lakshman (1933–2006), goalkeeper of the Indian hockey team in the 1956, 1960 and 1964 Olympics and won two golds and a silver; captain of the team which won the gold in the 1966 Asian Games; belonged to Mhow and lived his retired life here until his death
- Colonel C. K. Nayudu, first Indian Test captain in cricket; led India between 1932 and 1934
- Mir Ranjan Negi, hockey goalkeeper and coach of Indian women's team; won Asian Championship
- Naman Ojha, Indian wicket-keeper, stays and practices in Indore
- Rajat Patidar, cricketer, born in Indore
- Chandu Sarwate, former Indian cricketer and former Indian cricket selector; lived and died in Indore in 2003
- Jalaj Saxena (born 1986), cricketer who plays as an all rounder for the India A cricket team; born in Indore

== Academia, business, research and professionals ==
- Deepak Chaurasia, journalist, editor in chief of India News
- Seth Hukumchand, known as the 'cotton prince of India' and had much credit even in some overseas countries
- Ravi Salgia, translational thoracic oncologist, clinician/scientist, and academician
- Dr S Prakash Tiwari, former vice-chancellor of S. K. Rajasthan Agricultural University, Bikaner, and former director of National Academy of Agricultural Research Management, Hyderabad
- Siddhartha Paul Tiwari, academician and researcher, UNESCO chair on technology and sustainability

== See also ==
- List of people from Malwa
