= Kanch Mandir =

Jain temple in Indore, India

Kanch Ka Mandir Temple of Glass
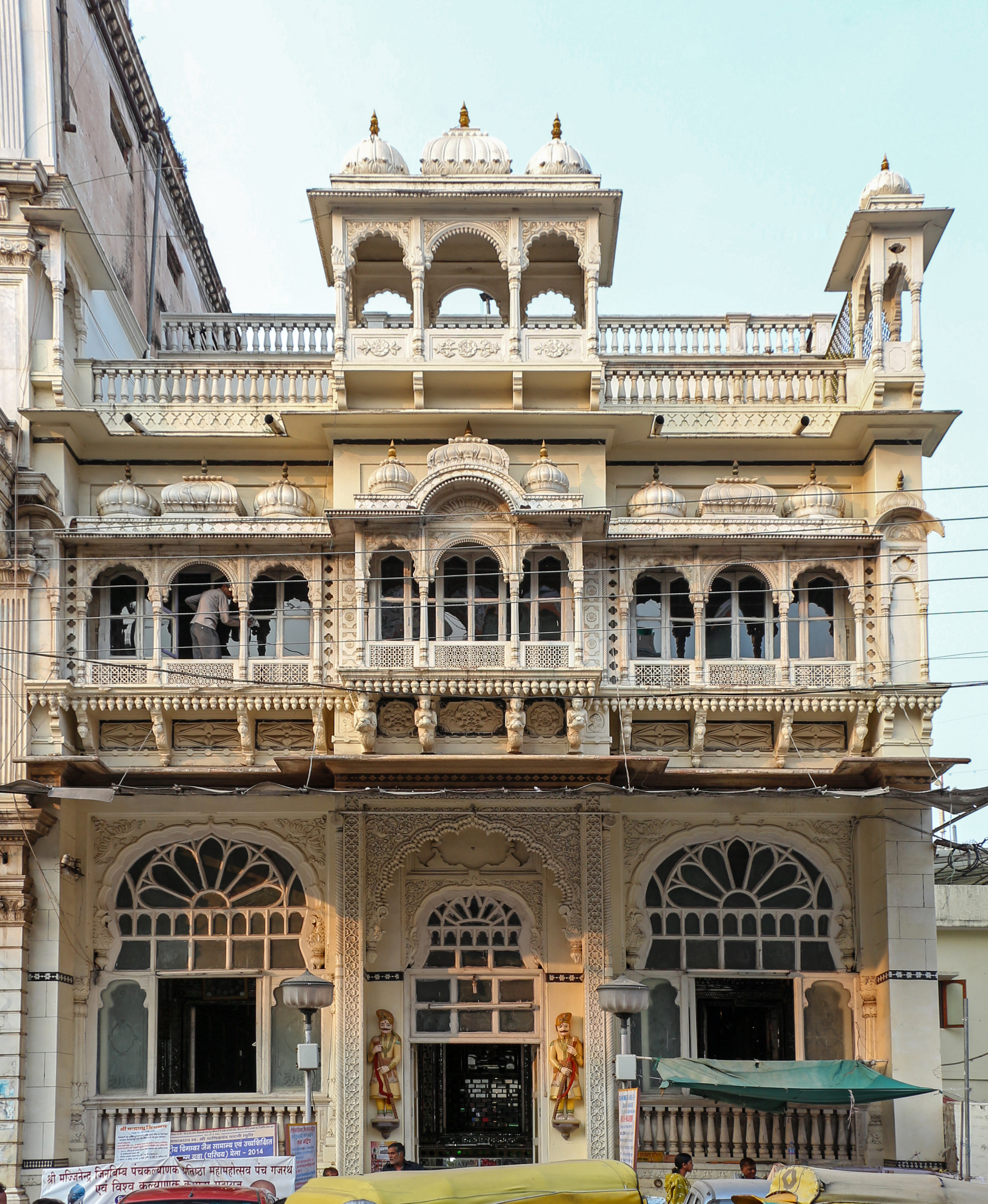
- Kanch Mandir

- Location within Madhya Pradesh

Religion
- Affiliation: Jainism
- Deity: Shantinatha
- Festival: Mahavir Jayanti

Location
- Location: Indore, Madhya Pradesh
- Coordinates: 22.747°N 75.869°E

Architecture
- Creator: Seth Hukumchand
- Established: 1903
- Temple: 1

Kanch Mandir, literally Temple of Glass, is a famous Jain temple in Indore, built by Sir Seth Hukumchand Jain. The construction began sometime around 1903.

== History ==
Sir Seth Seth Hukumchand Jain was a prominent trader and one of India's industrial pioneer. He built a mansion at Itwaria Bazar called Shish Mahal and adjacent to it the Kanch Ka Mandir, both elegantly built using a white stone. Externally, the temple is built as a medieval mansion complete with a canopied balcony and a shikhara.

== Structure and Interior ==
The interior of Kanch Ka Mandir is entirely covered by glass panels and mosaics; including the floor, columns, walls and the ceilings. Seth Hukumchand hired craftsmen from Jaipur and some even from Iran to work on the temple. The ornamentation follow the old and medieval Jain style, with the major innovation being the use of multicolored glass and mirrors.

In the main Garbhagriha, the idols of the Tirthankaras are flanked by mirrors on both sides, thus their images are seen infinite times.

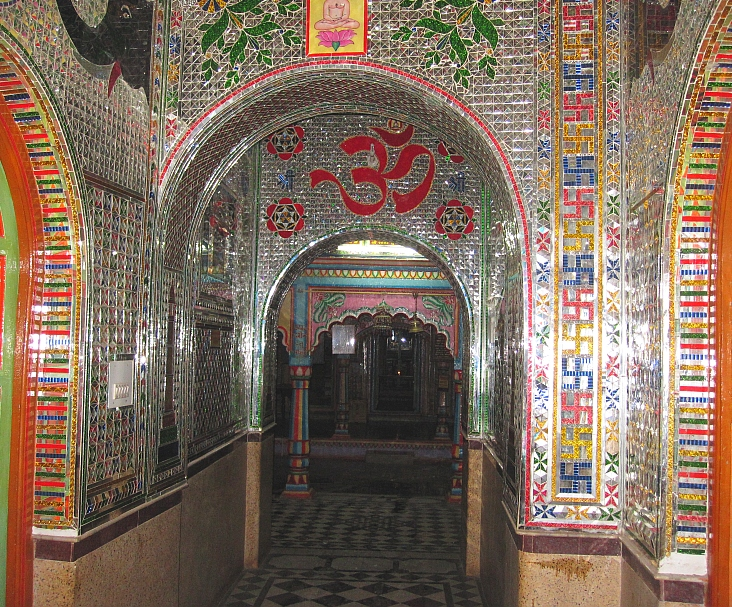
Jain Temple Katni, inspired by Kach Ka Mandir, Indore

Photography of the interior is generally prohibited.

The temple serves as a central institution for Indore Jains. Some processions start or terminate at the Kach Ka Mandir.

== Festivals ==
Jain festivals are celebrated with great enthusiasm at the Kach Ka Mandir. On Sugandh Dashami, special mandalas are constructed using multi-colored rice-powder.

Collective kshamavani (festival of forgiveness) in Indore is organized here as a central institution, even though it is also celebrated at other Indore Jain temples.

Annual Ratha Yatra on a golden palaki is taken our from here.
