= Seth Hukumchand =

Indian businessman

- Born: 1874; Indore
- Died: 1959 (aged 84–85); Indore
- Occupation(s): Businessman, activist, philanthropist

Sir Seth Swarupchand Hukumchand Ji Kasliwal (or Hukamchand) of Indore, Holkar State (1874–1959) was an Indian industrialist and a prominent leader of the Jain community for about 50 years.

His ancestor, Seth Pusaji, had settled in Indore in 1787 under the patronage of the Holkar rulers of Indore, then part of the Maratha Empire. His father, Seth Sarup Chand, was himself a successful businessman; however, Hukumchand transformed the few lakhs he inherited into a fortune of many crores. In his lifetime he donated various amounts amounting to about ₹8 million (US$95,000).

He was initially associated with the firm Trilok Chand Hukam Chand, set up by his father and two uncles, while he was only 6 years old. By age 16, he had himself become a successful businessman.

He was given the honor of wearing the Holkar-Shahi Pagdi (Boat Shaped Maratha styled Turban) and Angarkha (court dress), which were usually worn by the Maratha, Rajput and Brahmin nobility (Sardars, Jagirdars, Istamuradars and Mankaris) which were a part of the Indore state's Durbar.

== Industrial pioneer ==
Hukumchand became a leading business magnate of the country doing speculative and ready trade in commodities on a large scale. He was known as the "Cotton Prince of India" and had much credit even in some overseas countries. The New York Cotton exchange was closed for two day on his death. His offices were located in important cities of India.

He established cotton mills (Hukam Chand Mill and Raj Kumar Mill at Indore), and a large jute mill and iron mill at Calcutta. He was a pioneer in Swadeshi industry. He was the first Indian businessman to set up a jute mill.

== Social contributions ==
Hukumchand was a champion of the nationwide Khadi Movement initiated by Mahatma Gandhi in 1920 and a leader of the Swadeshi Movement of 1931 in Bombay. He financially supported Hindi Sahitya Sammelan and was President of Madhya Bharat Hindi Sahitya Samiti.

He had an unparalleled record of religious and social service. He protected Jain Tirthas, and constructed and repaired several Jain temples. He built the famous Kach Ka Mandir in Indore.

He served as:

- President of Digambar Jain Mahasabha
- Dig. Jain Trithakshetra Committee
- Bombay Prantic Dig, Jain Sabha
- Presided over numerous religious, social and political organizations

With his influence he resolved major religious and social issues. He was a great devotee of Jain munis and went on several pilgrimages.

He was made Rai Bahadur in 1915 and honoured with the title of 'Sir' (knighthood) in 1919. Maharaja of Gwalior presented him Khilat and rulers of Indore honoured him with the titles of Rajya Bhushan, Rao Raja and Rajya Ratna.

He established:

- Sir Hukam Chand Eye Hospital
- Kalyanmal Nursing Home
- Raj Kumar Singh Ayurvedic
- Kanchan Bai Maternity Home
- Kanchan Bai Shravikashram
- Tukoji Rao Cloth Market
- Gaushala, Jain temple and boarding house in Banaras University

On Mahatma Gandhi's visit to Indra Bhawan, Hukumchand agreed to give him his 40 acres (160,000 m^{2}) of farmland for building the Kasturbagram village.

He donated Rs. 400,000 for the construction of Lady Hardinge Medical College and Hospital at New Delhi. He donated Rs. 200,000 for the welfare of agriculturists. He provided enormous financial assistance during the famine of 1899 and the plague epidemics of 1903 and 1908.

== Transformation ==
In his later life, Hukamchand gave up wearing expensive clothes and jewellery studded with precious gems, and switched to simple clothes.

== See also ==
- Daly College
- Yeshwant Club
- Tukojirao Holkar II
- Shivajirao Holkar
- Tukojirao Holkar III
- Yeshwantrao Holkar II
