= Prabhash Joshi =

Indian journalist

- Born: 15 July 1937; Ashta sehore, Madhya Pradesh, India
- Died: 5 November 2009 (aged 72)
- Occupations: Journalist, Editor

Prabhash Joshi (15 July 1937 – 5 November 2009) was an Indian journalist, especially Hindi journalism, writer and political analyst. He was strongly in favour of "ethics and transparency". He played a part in Gandhian movement, Bhoodan movement, and in the surrender of bandits and in the struggle against emergency.

== Early life ==
Prabhash Joshi was born in Ashta near Bhopal, Madhya Pradesh, India to Pandarinath Joshi and Leela Bai.

== Career ==
Prabhash Joshi began his career with Nayi Duniya, was the founder editor of Hindi daily Jansatta in 1983.

He was with the Gandhi Peace Foundation and edited the Hindi version of Everyman's, a journal devoted to advocating Jayaprakash's views and sponsored by Ramnath Goenka. This journal campaigned for JP's movement for purity in public life.

He was also known for his writings on cricket. As a television commentator, he was mainly invited for his views and comments on national politics during the Lok Sabha (lower house of the Parliament of India) or Vidhan Sabha (Legislative Assembly of an Indian state) elections.

Joshi had been writing a Sunday column for Jansatta entitled "Kagad-Kare" for' many years. Recently he had started writing a weekly column entitled "Aughat-Ghat" for Tehelka Hindi. He also worked with the Indian Express as the resident editor at Ahmedabad, Chandigarh and Delhi. After retiring from the newspaper in 1995, he continued as the chief editorial advisor.

He also wrote a book on Hinduism. As he was from the land of the Malwa region of Kumar Gandharva, he loved the unique staccato style of classical vocal music.

=== Death ===
Prabhash Joshi died 5 November 2009 from a heart attack, after watching an India-Australia cricket match.

== Personal life ==
Prabhash Joshi was married to Usha. He lived with his wife in Jansatta Apartments, in Vasundhara, Ghaziabad, Uttar Pradesh. They have a daughter, Sonal, and two sons, Sandeep and Sopan.
