= Royal Oasis =

Palace in Wankaner, India

Coordinates: 22°37′29″N 70°55′58″E

- Interactive map of the Royal Oasis area

General information
- Location: Wankaner, India

Website
- https://www.wankanerheritagehotels.com/

Royal Oasis in Wankaner, Gujarat, India, was the former summer residence of the erstwhile royal family of Wankaner. It now operates as a heritage hotel.

== History ==
The history of the Royal Oasis begins in the 1870s when Banesinhji erected a single-storey bungalow in colonial-style architecture for resting and named it Garden House. After Banesinhji, his son and successor, Amarsinhji continued using it for the same purpose and would host his guests there. In 1917, when Amarsinhji's daughter married Purna Chandra Bhanj Deo, the Maharaja of Mayurbhanj, he hosted them there and named it Purna Chandra Bhawan after his son-in-law. Purna Chandra Bhawan means full-moon house. In the 1930s, Amarsinhji commissioned the Chief Engineer of Wankaner State to build an extension to the original building, which consisted of two large suites, four other bedrooms, and additional rooms. Afterward, Art Deco furniture was imported for it. It is decorated with hunting trophies, weapons, and vintage cars.

The family used it as their retreat during summer. In 1972, Pratapsinhji gifted it to his son, Digvijaysinhji, who opened it as a hotel. It is now a two-storey block in cream and white stucco with Corinthian plaster details. It also has a swimming pool and spans an area of 225 acres.
