= Jhala (surname) =

Jhala is a surname of Gujarati and Rajasthani Rajputs based in Indian states of Gujarat and southern Rajasthan.

Notable people with the surname include:

- Digvijaysinh Jhala, Indian politician
- Kesridevsinh Jhala, Indian politician
- Zalim Singh Jhala, defecto ruler of Kota State
- Lal Singh Jhala, politician of the Indian congress
- Parth Jhala, Indian cricketer
- Pratapsinhji Jhala, Indian ruler
- MK Ranjitsinh Jhala, Indian author
- Yadvendradev Vikramsinh Jhala, Indian scientist
- Meghraj Singh Jhala, last ruler of Dhrangadhra State

== See also ==
- Jhala (clan)
- Jhala Nath Khanal
