= 2022 Morbi bridge collapse =

Bridge collapse in Gujarat, India

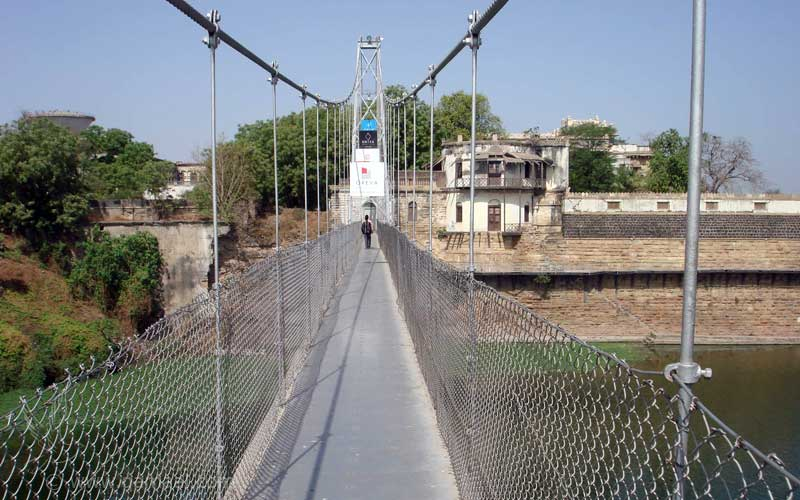
- The bridge photographed in 2008

- Date: 30 October 2022
- Time: 18:40 (IST, UTC+5:30)
- Location: Morbi, Gujarat, India; 22°49′06″N 70°50′34″E
- Type: Bridge failure
- Deaths: 141
- Injuries: 180+

On 30 October 2022, a pedestrian suspension bridge over the Machchhu River in the city of Morbi in Gujarat, India, collapsed, causing the deaths of at least 141 people and injuries to more than 180 others.

The 19th-century bridge had reopened five days earlier, in time for Diwali and the Gujarati New Year, following a lengthy closure for repairs.

== Background ==
Jhulto Pul (Gujarati: ઝૂલતો પુલ; "hanging bridge") was a 230-metre-long (750 ft), 1.25-metre-wide (4.1 ft) pedestrian suspension bridge, 15 metres (49 ft) over the Machchhu River, connecting the districts of Mahaprabhuji and Samakantha. It was built during British rule in India in the 19th century. Dates for its construction vary, but according to locals, it was built in the 1880s by Waghji Thakore, the local maharaja. It connected Darbargadh Palace with Nazarbag Palace (now Lukhdhirji Engineering College), the residences of the erstwhile royal family of Morbi State.

At that time, there was a limit of fifteen people on the bridge at once, as the narrow structure meant it swayed with any greater weight.

In recent times the bridge was owned and operated as a toll bridge by the Morbi municipality, which signed a contract with the Morbi-based private trust Oreva – a company known for making clocks – for maintenance and operations on 7 March 2022. The 15-year contract was with Oreva's flagship company, Ajanta Manufacturing Private Limited, which had been involved with the bridge since 2008. The agreement covered the maintenance and management of the bridge. The toll bridge reopened on 26 October 2022 on the occasion of the Gujarati New Year, after being closed for repairs for six months. After the refurbishment, it had an updated capacity of 125 people (up from the 15 it was before). At the re-opening ceremony, Oreva's managing director told the reporters that the people could enjoy a "care-free adventure" and the bridge would not need any major work for another eight to ten years.

== Collapse ==
On 30 October 2022, five days after reopening, the bridge collapsed at 6:40 p.m. More than 500 people were on the bridge at the time of the collapse, far exceeding the official capacity of 125. Security footage of the bridge showed the structure shaking violently and people holding onto cables and fencing on either side of the bridge before the walkway gave way. Images of rescue and recovery operations showed the walkway had divided at its midpoint, with some pieces still hanging from snapped cables.

A survivor said that so many people on the bridge could barely move and that pieces of the bridge crushed some victims. Mohan Kundariya, a Member of Parliament, Lok Sabha who lost 12 family members including his sister in the incident, said he believed the cause was overloading. A spokesperson for Oreva said that it appeared too many people were in the middle section of the bridge "trying to sway it".

The teams of State Disaster Response Force of Gujarat along with National Disaster Response Force started rescue operations. Later they were joined by Army, Navy, and Air Force staff. Police, military, and disaster response teams were deployed for rescue operations.

== Victims ==
At least 141 people were confirmed dead and more than 180 were rescued. A large number of the victims were women, the elderly, and children (39 boys and 16 girls) with the youngest fatality being an 18-month-old baby.

The Government of Gujarat announced an ex gratia payment of ₹4 lakh (US$4,200) to the next of kin of each person who died, and ₹50,000 (US$520) to the injured.

== Investigation ==
Initial reports said that the bridge was reopened early after repairs, without the required certificate of fitness from the local civic authorities of Morbi municipality. The chief officer of the municipality, who had agreed on the contract for repairs after the 2001 earthquake, said the private firm responsible for the renovations "threw the bridge open to visitors without notifying us, and therefore, we couldn't get a safety audit of the bridge conducted".

A forensic report presented in court said that the bridge could not withstand the weight of the new heavy flooring given the cables were rusted, it had broken anchors, and the bolts connecting the aforementioned two were loose. A five-member committee was formed by the Government of Gujarat to investigate and determine the cause. Jaysukh Patel, managing director of the Oreva Group and the main accused in the Morbi bridge collapse case and nine other people, all associated with the Oreva group, were arrested and subject to investigation: two managers and two ticket clerks employed by Oreva, two contractors, and three hired security guards.

A first information report was filed against the maintenance and management agencies of the bridge under sections 304 (culpable homicide not amounting to murder), 308 (intentional act causing death), and 114 (abettor present when offence committed) of the Indian Penal Code.

== Controversy ==
In November 2024, Patel was felicitated at an event organised by the Kadva Patidar Kanya Kelavani Mandal in Morbi district. Patel, who was released on bail by the Supreme Court in March 2024, attended the event after a court relaxed a condition restricting his entry into Morbi during the trial. Following the Gujarat High Court's rejection of his regular bail application, Patel appealed to the Supreme Court, which ordered his release on 22 March 2024 and directed the trial court to determine the conditions of his bail. One of the conditions initially prohibited him from entering Morbi for the duration of the trial.

During the ceremony, held in connection with the Pran Pratishtha of the Uma Sanskardham temple, Patel was weighed against modak, a traditional Indian sweet. The organisers said that the sweets, weighing approximately the same as Patel, would be distributed in 60,000 boxes among members of the Patidar community. They stated that the felicitation was intended to honour Patel and his brothers as the sons of their late father, O. R. Patel, founder of the Ajanta Group and a prominent philanthropist.

The felicitation drew criticism from relatives of victims of the Morbi bridge collapse.

== See also ==
- 1979 Machchhu dam failure
- 2016 Kolkata flyover collapse
- 2019 Mumbai foot overbridge collapse
