= Radhikaraje Gaekwad =

Maharani of Baroda (born 1978)

- Maharani
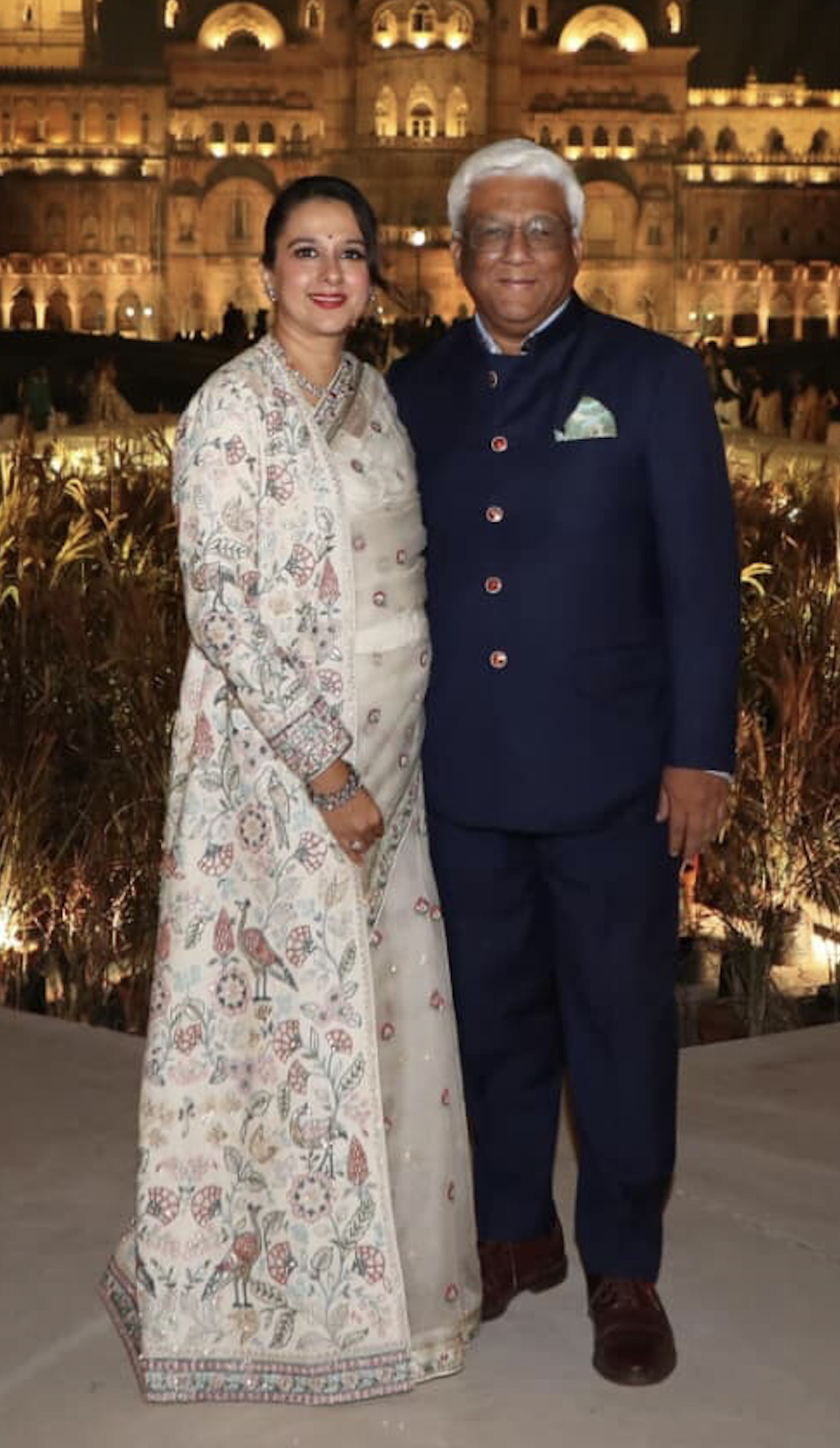
- With her husband Samarjitsinh

Maharani of Baroda
- Tenure: 9 May 2012 – present
- Born: Radhika Kumari; 19 July 1978 (age 48)
- Spouse: Samarjitsinh Gaekwad (m. 2002)
- Issue: Padmajaraje; Narayaniraje
- House: Baroda (by marriage); Wankaner (by birth)
- Father: Ranjitsinh Jhala
- Mother: Kalpana Kumari
- Website: radhikaraje.com

Radhikaraje Gaekwad (born Radhika Kumari; 19 July 1978) is the Maharani of Baroda.

== Early life, education and family ==
She was born on 19 July 1978 to Ranjitsinh Jhala of Wankaner and his wife Kalpana Kumari. She completed her preliminary education in Delhi and later at Mayo College Girls’ School in Ajmer. She did her undergraduate and graduate studies in Indian history from Lady Shri Ram College, a constituent college of the University of Delhi. She married on 27 February 2002 in New Delhi to Samarjitsinh Gaekwad, the heir-apparent of Baroda. She and her husband have two children: Padmajaraje and Narayaniraje.

== Career ==
She worked as a writer for the Indian Express following the completion of her undergraduate studies. She worked as a journalist for three years before getting married.

== Titles, styles and honours ==
=== Titles and styles ===
Before her marriage, she was styled as Rajkumari of Wankaner. Upon her marriage in 2002, Radhikaraje became Yuvarani of Baroda. Upon her father-in-law’s death on 9 May 2012, her husband automatically succeeded to the throne of Baroda and Radhikaraje became the Maharani as per family custom. Since the coronation of her husband on 22 June 2012, she is styled as Her Highness the Maharani.

Her complete styles and titles since 2012 are: Her Highness Maharani Shrimant Akhand Soubhagyavati Radhikaraje Sahib Gaekwad, the Maharani of Baroda. Her title holds no official status under Indian law, as the Twenty-Sixth Amendment to the Constitution of India abolished the formal recognition of royal titles, privileges, and associated entitlements previously granted to the rulers of princely states.

=== Honorary degrees ===
Country	Date	School	Degree	Ref
England	2023	University of East London	Doctorate of Arts	
