= Ramniklal K. Gandhi =

Indian pediatric surgeon, medical academic and writer

- Born: 18 January 1929; Khanpar, Wankaner, Gujarat, India
- Died: 14 June 2003 (aged 74)
- Occupation: Pediatric surgeon
- Spouse: Madhu
- Awards: Padma Shri

Ramniklal Kirchand Gandhi was an Indian pediatric surgeon, medical academic, writer and the president of the Association of Surgeons of India. Born in a Jain family of modest means in Khanpar, Wankaner, Gujarat in the Indian state of Gujarat on 18 January 1929, he did his schooling at Rajkot and graduated in medicine from the King Edward Memorial Hospital and Seth Gordhandas Sunderdas Medical College, Mumbai with first rank. He did his post graduation at the same institute in pediatric surgery while practicing medicine.

Gandhi was the president of the Association of Surgeons of India and was the editorial secretary or editor of the Indian Journal of Surgery from 1965 to 1989. He was an honorary fellow of the Royal College of Surgeons of Edinburgh and was the co-author of the book, G. D. Adhia's Operative Surgery and Instruments, published in 1983. The Government of India awarded him the fourth highest Indian civilian honour of Padma Shri in 1985.

He was married to his wife, Madhu. He died on 14 June 2003, at the age of 74.

== See also ==
- King Edward Memorial Hospital and Seth Gordhandas Sunderdas Medical College
