= Jitu Somani =

Indian politician

Jitu Kantilal Somani (born 1959) is an Indian politician from Gujarat. He is a member of the Gujarat Legislative Assembly from Wankaner Assembly constituency in Morbi district. He won the 2022 Gujarat Legislative Assembly election representing the Bharatiya Janata Party.

== Early life and education ==
Somani is from Wankaner, Morbi district, Gujarat. He is the son of Kantilal Somani. He studied Class 5 and passed the examinations in 1971. Later, he discontinued his studies.

== Career ==
Somani won from Wankaner Assembly constituency representing the Bharatiya Janata Party in the 2022 Gujarat Legislative Assembly election. He polled 80,677 votes and defeated his nearest rival and three time MLA, Mohammed Javed Pirzada of the Indian National Congress, by a margin of 19,955 votes. After getting elected as an MLA, he was nominated as the Airport Advisory Committee for the Rajkot International Airport under the chairmanship of Parshottam Rupala, the Rajkot MP. Earlier in 2017, he lost to Pirzada Mahamadjavid Abdulmutalib of the Indian National Congress by a margin of 1,361 votes.
