= Ranjit Vilas Palace (Wankaner) =

Principal palace in Gujarat, India

Coordinates: 22°36′34″N 70°56′11″E

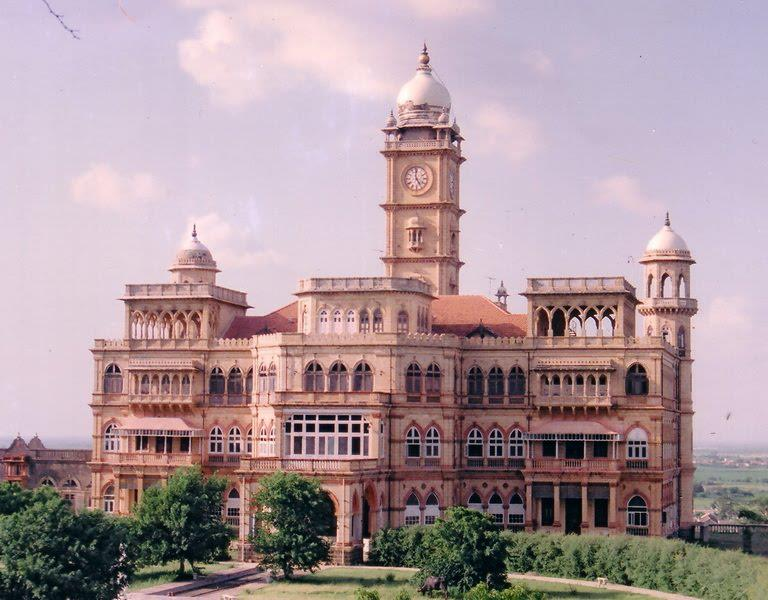
The Ranjit Vilas Palace, Wankaner

Ranjit Vilas Palace is the principal palace and, until 2012, the residence of the royal family of the princely state of Wankaner in what is now the Indian state of Gujarat.

== Location ==
The palace is located atop a hill in the Gadhio Hills and overlooks both the town of Wankaner and the Machchhu River. The palace estate covers an area of 225 acres (91 ha) and has on its grounds the erstwhile British Residency, several bungalows, a garage housing a collection of vintage cars and buggies and a stable for Kathiawari horses.

== History ==
Construction of the palace began in 1907 and its foundation stone was laid by the Jamsaheb of Nawanagar, Ranjitsinhji, after whom the palace is named. Ranjitsinhji was a close friend of the Maharana of Wankaner, Amarsinhji Banesinhji, who is thought to have designed the building. It served as the residence of the royal family of Wankaner until 2012. The building suffered much damage in the Gujarat earthquake of 2001.

== Architecture ==
The palace was designed by the Maharana of Wankaner and is a mix of several styles of architecture including the Venetian-Gothic, Italianate, Mughal and Rajput styles. The three-storeyed building features a Venetian-Gothic façade, carved jharokha balconies which are a feature of Rajput palaces, gothic arches and Doric columns and Franco-Italian windowpanes. There is an Italianate marble fountain in the front garden. The sandstone of which the palace is built was sourced from quarries in Wankaner State. The palace also has a clock tower topped with an onion dome which suffered extensive damage in the 2001 earthquake.

Much of the decor and furnishings of the palace was imported from Europe. Its interiors are richly decorated and feature Italian marble flooring, Burma teak furniture and chandeliers from Murano and Belgium. The walls of the palace are adorned with what is claimed to be the largest collection of hunting trophies in India. An area of the palace was turned into a museum and the palace garage houses a collection of vintage cars.

== Recent history ==
In 2013 the Hindi films Matru Ki Bijlee Ka Mandola and Grand Masti were shot at the Ranjit Vilas Palace as was the 2023 film Gaslight. In 2018, thieves broke into the palace and made away with loot worth Rs 3.4 million including silver chairs, a marble gold-plated Victorian clock and a silver replica of the Wankaner House in Mumbai.
