= Lakhdhirji Waghji =

Maharaja of Morvi from 1922 to 1948

- Maharaja

Maharaja of Morvi
- Reign: 11 June 1922 – 21 January 1948
- Predecessor: Waghji II Rawaji
- Successor: Mahendrasinhji
- Born: 26 December 1876
- Died: 4 May 1957 (aged 80)
- Wives: Nand Kunverba (m. 1898; died 1915); Suraj Kunverba (m. 1898; died 1945); Kesar Kunverba (m. 1908)
- Issue Detail: Mahendrasinhji; Kalikakumarsinhji
- Father: Waghji II Rawaji
- Mother: Bajirajba Kunverba

Lakhdhirji Waghji (26 December 1876 – 4 May 1957) was Maharaja of Morvi from 11 June 1922 until his abdication in 1948.

== Early life, family, and education ==
He was born on 26 December 1876 to Waghji II Rawaji and his wife Bajirajba Kunverba. He was educated privately in India and England. He married three times: first, in 1898, to Nand Kunverba, daughter of Gambhirsinhji Varisalji, the ruler of Rajpipla; second, in the same year, to Suraj Kunverba, daughter of Mansinhji Prithvirajji, the ruler of Baria; and third, in 1908, to Kesar Kunverba, daughter of Sarvaiya Bawaji Ranaji, the talukdar of Ranigam and Datha. His first wife died in 1915, and his second in 1945. By his first wife, he had three sons and two daughters, but none of them lived long. By his second wife, he had a son, Kalikakumarsinhji, who was born in November 1918. By his third wife, he had a son, Mahendrasinhji, born on 1 January 1918, and another son who died young.

== Reign ==
Lakhdhirji acceded to the throne of Morvi upon his father’s death on 6 June 1922. He personally examined the details of every department of the state administration. In 1924, he converted the narrow-gauge railway line between Wankaner and Morvi to metre gauge, and in 1926, he oversaw the construction of a branch line from Than to Chotila. He also took a keen interest in advancing education within his state. In 1923, he made both primary and secondary education completely free. Prior to his reign, in 1921–1922, Morvi had 29 schools with 1,276 students enrolled; by 1936–1937, these figures had increased to 99 schools and 4,545 students. He established several scholarships, including the Nand Kunverba Fund and the Bajirajba Kunverba Fund. The latter provided twelve scholarships with a combined monthly value of Rs. 250 for students pursuing academic and technical studies, on the condition that recipients would serve Morvi after completing their education. He also founded the Shri Sir Waghji Bahadur Loan Scholarship Fund in memory of his father, which awarded twelve scholarships with a combined annual value of Rs. 5,000 for collegiate education in cities such as Mumbai and Pune.

Between 1922 and 1936, Lakhdhirji spent over Rs. 5,300,000 on public works and water supply. He opened the boring department in 1925, which expended Rs. 600,000 by 1936 and constructed 500 wells, 400 of which were intended for agricultural use. Between 1932 and 1936, he remitted approximately Rs. 3,000,000 in land revenue and wrote off outstanding peasant debts amounting to about Rs. 1,000,000. To improve agriculture, he granted cultivators permanent occupancy rights upon payment of a nominal fee, established an agricultural bank, and created a new department to bring uncultivated land under cultivation, construct new wells, repair and deepen existing ones, and expand irrigation schemes. He also set aside Rs. 2,500,000 to support agriculturists during periods of famine.

He donated Rs. 100,000 to Banaras Hindu University. In 1926, he was granted the hereditary title of Maharaja by the Government of India..

== Abdication ==
He abdicated as ruler of Morvi on 21 January 1948. He was succeeded by his son Mahendrasinhji. Although Lakhdhirji possessed a substantial fortune, Mahendrasinhji began providing him with a monthly allowance in 1949, which continued until Lakhdhirji’s death.

== Death ==
He died on 4 May 1957.

== Honours ==
He was appointed a Knight Commander of the Order of the Star of India on 1 January 1930. He was later appointed a Knight Grand Cross of the Order of the British Empire on 8 June 1939. On 21 January 1942, Banaras Hindu University conferred upon him the honorary degree of Doctor of Laws at its Special Silver Jubilee Convocation. The degree was awarded in absentia.
