= Uddhav =

Uddhav (also spelled Uddhava, Udhav) is a Hindu male name found in India. It may refer to:

== People ==
- Uddhava, a character from the Bhagavata Purana text of Hinduism
- Uddhav Bhandari (c. 1967–2007), Nepali asylum seeker who self-immolated in the UK
- Udhavrao Patil (1920–1984), Indian politician
- Uddhav Thackeray (born 1960), Indian politician

== Other ==
- Uddhav Thackeray ministry (2019–2022), a ruling coalition in Maharashtra, India
- Uddhav Sampraday, a Hindu Vaishnava sect that evolved into the Swaminarayan Sampradaya

== See also ==
- Uddhava Gita, a standalone work consisting Krishna's final discourse to Uddhava
- Odhav, neighbourhood in Ahmedabad, Gujarat, India
- Odhava, village in Gujarat, India
- Odhavram, Indian religious teacher and Gandhist
- Odhavaji Raghavji Patel, Indian businessman
