= Kesridevsinh Jhala =

Indian politician

Member of Parliament, Rajya Sabha
- Incumbent
- Assumed office 19 August 2023
- Preceded by: Jugalji Thakor
- Constituency: Gujarat

Personal details
- Born: 5 November 1982 Wankaner Taluka, Rajkot District, British India
- Political party: Bharatiya Janata Party

Kesridevsinh Jhala is an Indian politician belonging to the Bharatiya Janata Party. He was elected to the Rajya Sabha, the upper house of the Indian Parliament unopposed from Gujarat. Kesridevsinh Jhala is the son of the late Congress leader and former Union environment minister Digvijaysinh Jhala.

== Early life ==
Kesridevsinh Jhala was born on 5 November 1982 in Wankaner in the Saurashtra region. He completed his schooling at Vidyabharti Education Trust, in Wankaner, completed high school from New Era High School, Panchgani in Maharashtra, and graduated from Lady Shri Ram College with B.A. (Hons.) in History. Kesridevsinh Jhala done is degree from Tourism and Lieser Management at the University of Huddersfield in Yorkshire, United Kingdom.

== Personal life ==
Kesaridevsinh Jhala is married to Yogini Kumari, a princess of the Sirohi royal family of Rajasthan. The then Chief Minister Narendra Modi also attended Kesridev Singh’s wedding. Jhala’s grandfather Pratap Singh was an MLA from Wankaner during 1952-57. His father Digvijaysinh Jhala was a two-time MLA during 1979-1989. He was the first Environment Minister of India during 1979–1989. He was the president of Akhil Bhartiya Kshatriya Mahasabha for years. Jhala’s uncle Janakdev Sinh Jhala was also the Wankaner MLA during 1975-1980. His maternal uncle Ajay Singh was the railway minister in VP Singh’s government at the Centre.

== Political career ==
Kesridevsinh Jhala started his political career with BJP in 2011 in the presence of then-Chief Minister Narendra Modi and was officially in charge of Wankaner Taluka BJP’s taluka panchayat and district panchayat. He was the district BJP vice president of Rajkot for one term and the district BJP vice president of Morbi district for one term. Kesridevsinh Jhala, have been declared elected uncontested as Rajyasabha MP on 2023 July 17 from Gujarat.
