= Morbi Assembly constituency =

Constituency of the Gujarat legislative assembly in India

Coordinates: 22.82°N 70.83°E

Morbi
- Constituency No. 65 for the Gujarat Legislative Assembly

Constituency details
- Country: India
- Region: Western India
- State: Gujarat
- District: Morbi
- Lok Sabha constituency: Kachchh
- Established: 2007
- Total electors: 286,905
- Reservation: None

Member of Legislative Assembly
- 15th Gujarat Legislative Assembly
- Incumbent Kantilal Shivlal Amrutiya
- Party: Bharatiya Janata Party
- Elected year: 2022

Morbi is one of the 182 Legislative Assembly constituencies of Gujarat state in India. It is part of Morbi district. It is numbered as 65-Morbi.

== List of segments ==
This assembly seat represents the following segments

1. Maliya-Miyana Taluka
2. Morbi Taluka (Part) Villages – Sokhda, Bahadurgadh, Nava Nagdavas, Piludi, Rapar, Aniyari, Jetpar, Vaghpar, Juna Nagdavas, Gungan, Gala, Sapar, Jasmatgadh, Chakampar, Zinkiyali, Jivapar Chakampar, Kerala, Haripar, Nava Sadulka, Ravapar Nadi, Juna Sadulka, Bela Rangpar, Rangpar, Sanala (Talaviya), Timbdi, Dharampur, Amreli, Mahendranagar, Madhapar, Bhadiyad, Morbi (M), Trajpar

== Members of Legislative Assembly ==
Election	Member	Party
2007	Kantilal Amrutiya	Bharatiya Janata Party
2012	Kantilal Amrutiya	Bharatiya Janata Party
2017	Brijesh Merja	Indian National Congress
2020 (By election)	Brijesh Merja	Bharatiya Janata Party
2022	Kantilal Shivlal Amrutiya	Bharatiya Janata Party

== Election results ==
=== 2022 ===
2022 Gujarat Legislative Assembly election: Morbi
Party	Candidate	Votes	%	±%
BJP	Amrutiya Kantilal Shivlal Bharatiya	1,14,538	59.21	▲14.14
INC	Patel Jayantilal Jerajbhai	52,459	27.12	▼14.71
AAP	Pankaj Kantilal Ransariya	17,544	9.07	New
Independent	Siraj Amirali Popatiya	2,244	1.16	−−−
NOTA	None of the above	1,176	0.61	−−−
Majority		62,079	32.09	
Turnout		1,93,450	67.4	
BJP hold		Swing		

=== 2020 ===
A by-election was needed as the sitting MLA, Brijesh Merja, resigned from the assembly and his party. He won the by-election as the candidate for the BJP.

By-election, 2020: Morbi
Party	Candidate	Votes	%	±%
BJP	Brijesh Merja	64,711	45.07	▼1.96
INC	Jayantilan Jerajbhai Patel	60,062	41.83	▼9.14
Majority		4,649	3.24	▲1.53
Turnout		1,43,577	52.88	▼20.56
BJP gain from INC		Swing		

=== 2017 ===
2017 Gujarat Legislative Assembly election: Morbi
Party	Candidate	Votes	%	±%
INC	Brijesh Merja	89,396	50.97	▲4.67
BJP	Kantilal Shivlal Amrutiya	85,977	47.03	▼0.98
Majority		3,419	1.71	−−−
Turnout		1,75,373	73.44	−−−
INC gain from BJP		Swing		

=== 2012 ===
2012 Gujarat Legislative Assembly election: Morbi
Party	Candidate	Votes	%	±%
BJP	Kantilal Amrutiya	77,386	48.01	−−−
INC	Brijesh Merja	74,626	46.30	−−−
Majority		2,760	1.71	−−−
Turnout		1,61,183	73.44	−−−
BJP hold		Swing		

== See also ==
- List of constituencies of the Gujarat Legislative Assembly
- Morbi district
