= New Palace, Morbi =

Palace in Gujarat, India

Coordinates: 22.8128°N 70.8497°E

New Palace
- Interactive map of the New Palace area

General information
- Architectural style: Art Deco
- Location: Morbi, India
- Construction started: 1931
- Completed: 1944
- Client: Mahendrasinhji Lakhdiraji

Design and construction
- Architect: Kumar Ramsinh

The New Palace is a historic palace located in the city of Morbi, India. Built between 1931 and 1944 in the Art Deco style, it was commissioned by the Mahendrasinhji Lakhdiraji.

== Description ==
In 1931, Mahendrasinhji Lakhdiraji commissioned Kumar Ramsinh, a graduate of the Architectural Association and the second Indian partner at Gregson, Batley and King, to design this palace for his personal use. It was designed in the Art Deco style. It was built and furnished between 1931 and 1944. It was executed by the contractors Shapoorji Pallonji.

It has a pink plaster exterior with horizontal lines and curved corners. The interiors include rooms, a lounge with dining booths, two bars with triple-decker cushioned barstools, a gym, and a swimming pool. It has a library with walnut wood paneling and a fireplace. Furniture for it was purchased from a firm based on Tottenham Court Road, London. Mahendrasinhji also commissioned Polish artist Stefan Norblin to beautify the palace interiors with his paintings. Stefan created large murals and canvases featuring hunting scenes, Shiva in prayer, Krishna for Apollo riding his chariot across the sky, portraits of the Mahendrasinhji ancestors, and imagery showcasing the local flora and fauna.
