= Kantilal Amrutiya =

Indian politician

Member of the Gujarat Legislative Assembly
- Incumbent
- Assumed office 8 December 2022
- Succeeded by: Brijesh Merja
- Constituency: Morbi
- In office 1995–2017

Personal details
- Born: Kanabhai S. Amrutiya; 8 March 1962 (age 64) Jetpar, Morbi, Gujarat, India
- Party: Bharatiya Janata Party
- Education: Elementary
- Alma mater: V C Highschool, Morbi
- Website: Kantilal Amrutiya on FaceBook

Kanabhai Shivlal Amrutiya officially known as Kantilal Shivlal Amrutiya, born 8 March 1962, is a member of the Gujarat Legislative Assembly who represented Morbi constituency in Gujarat, India for five terms and Became first time MOS (Minister of State)Government of Gujarat in Bhupendrabhai Patel's Ministry reshuffle. He is known by the name "Kanabhai" among the people of Morbi and surroundings. He has worked in agriculture and industry.

== Personal life ==
Kanabhai was born on 8 March 1962 to a middle-class Patel community family in Jetpar in Morbi district of Gujarat State, India. During the floods due to the Morvi dam failure, in the 1970s, even as a young boy, he volunteered to serve to rehabilitate the victims. As a young man, he joined the Akhil Bharatiya Vidyarthi Parishad, a student organisation and was involved in the anti-corruption Nav Nirman Movement. After working as a full-time member for the organisation, he then joined the Bharatiya Janata Party. He completed his schooling from V C Technical Highschool at Morbi.

== Political career ==
Kanabhai was a Swayam Sevak in the RSS during his early years of social life. He took up the challenging task of energising the party cadres at local level in earnest. In association with co-workers and local industrialist, Kanabhai set about creating a strong cadre base of Bharatiya Janta Party in Morbi District, Saurashtra and Kutch. In the initial period, he started as a Member of Nagarpalika of Morbi and Taluka Panchayat, and his maternal uncle Amubhai Aghara was leading at constituency level.

The party cadres started gaining political mileage and formed a good rapport.

In 1995, Kanabhai has taken up the command of Party cadre at Morbi and elected as M.L.A. for the first time. Since then till now (As on 1.1.2013) he is serving the constituency of Morbi as M.L.A. continuously. In the Gujarat State Election in December 2012, Kanabhai was elected for 5th time.

=== Tenure as M.L.A. of Morbi ===
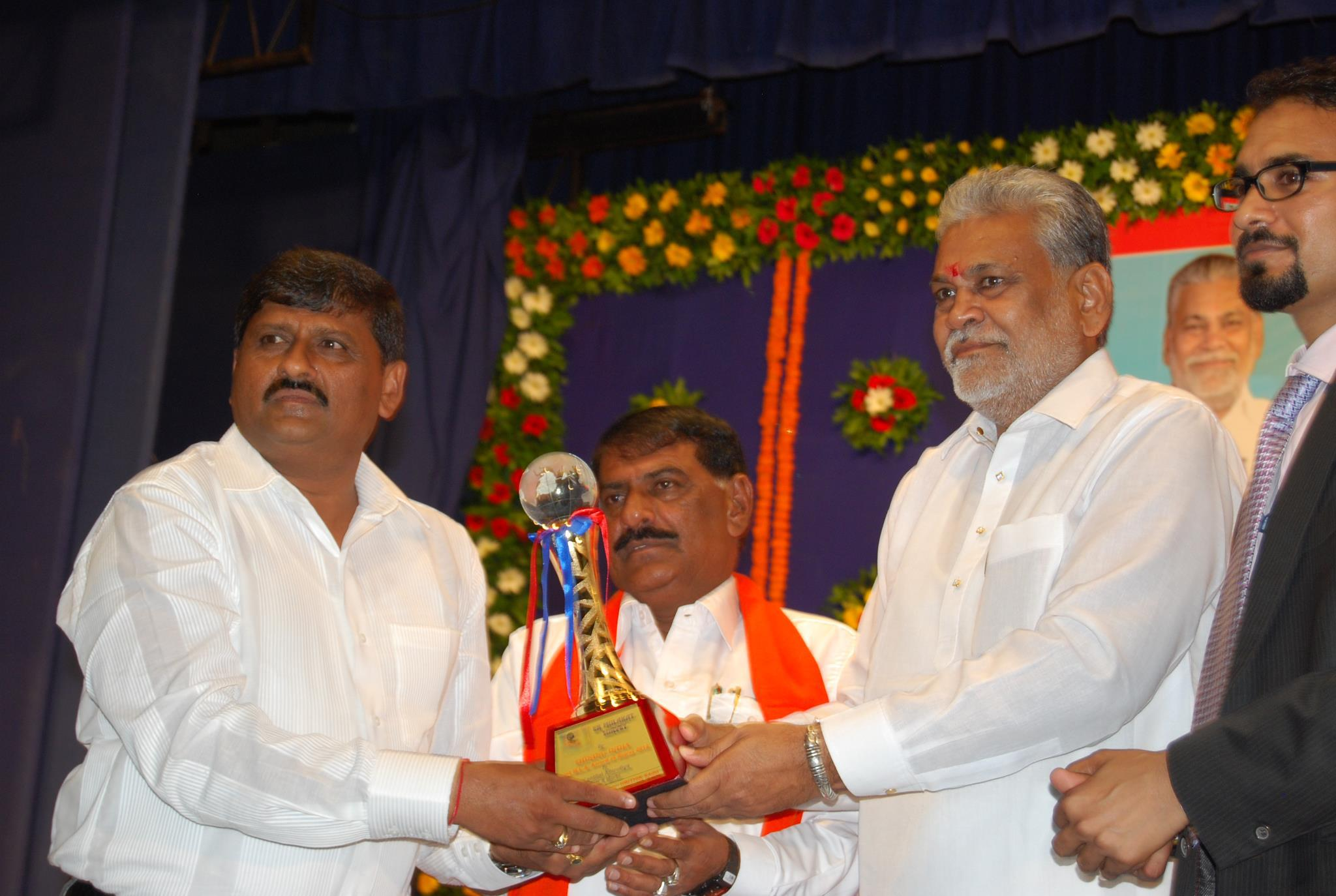
Kanabhai S Amrutiya receiving 2nd best M.L.A. Award out of 182 in Gujarat

In 1995, Kanabhai was first time elected as MLA and was a part of Government of Gujarat.

In 2012 Kanabhai was awarded the 2nd Best M.L.A. award among 182 M.L.A.'s of Gujarat by Shining India Info Pvt Ltd, during a survey project of "EkMulakat".

On 30 August 2015, Amrutiya resigned as the leader of the Morbi Ceramic Federation 5 days after its headquarters was set on fire by a Patidar mob. His office was torched during violence that erupted following the arrest of Patidar Anamat Andolan Samiti (PAAS) leader Hardik Patel in Ahmedabad.

== Criminal case ==
In 2004, Amrutiya and six others were given sentences of life imprisonment, after being convicted by the Gondal sessions court in the case of conspiring and killing the former president of Morbi municipality, Praveen Raveshia. Raveshia was stabbed to death in broad daylight on 16 September 1999 by four persons. In 2007, a 2-judge bench of the Gujarat High Court acquitted Amrutiya of murder charges as many of the witnesses in the case had turned hostile by the time the matter reached the purview of the High Court.
