= 1979 Machchhu dam failure =

1979 flood disaster in Gujarat, India

Coordinates: 22°45′50″N 70°51′57″E

Morbi Dam Failure
- Failed earthen embankment of Machchhu-2 dam

Meteorological history
- Date: 1979

Overall effects
- Fatalities: 1,800–25,000 (estimated)
- Damage: Estimated ₹100 crore (equivalent to ₹28 billion or US$290 million in 2026)
- Areas affected: Morbi and villages of Rajkot district, Gujarat, India

Location of Machhu dam and Morbi

The Machchhu dam failure or Morbi disaster is a dam-related flood disaster which occurred on 11 August, 1979. The Machchu-2 dam, situated on the Machchhu River, failed, sending a wall of water through the town of Morbi (now in the Morbi district) of Gujarat, India. Estimates of the number of people killed vary greatly, ranging from 1,800 to 25,000 people.

== The Machchu II dam ==
The first dam on the Machchhu river, named Machchhu I, was built in 1959 and had a catchment area of 730 square kilometres (280 square miles). The Machchhu II dam, an earthfill dam, was constructed in 1972, downstream of Machchhu I, and had a catchment area of 1,929 km^{2} (745 mi^{2}).

The dam was meant to serve as an irrigation scheme: considering the long history of drought in Saurashtra region, the primary consideration at the time of design was water supply, not flood control. It consisted of a masonry spillway of 206 metres (676 ft), with 18 sluice gates across the river section, and long earthen embankments on both sides. The spillway capacity provided for 5,663 cubic metres per second (200,000 cubic feet per second). The embankments were 2,345 metres (7,694 ft) in length on the right and 1,399 metres (4,590 ft) in length on the right. The embankments had a top width of 6.1 metres (20 feet), upstream and downstream slopes with a ratio of 1:3 (V:H) and 1:2 respectively, and a clay core extending through alluvium to bedrock. The upstream face consisted of 61 cm (24 inches) of small gravel and 61 cm (24 inches) of hand packed rip-rap. The dam stood 22.6 metres (74 ft) above the river bed and its overflow section was 164.5 metres (540 ft) long. The reservoir had a storage capacity of 101,020 cubic decametres (81,900 acre-feet).

== Failure ==
The failure was caused by excessive rain and massive flooding, leading to the disintegration of the earthen walls of the four kilometre long dam. The actual observed flow following the intense rainfall reached 16,307 m^{3}/s (575,900 cu ft/s), three times what the dam was designed for, resulting in its collapse. 762 metres (2,500 ft) of the left and 365 metres (1,198 ft) of the right embankment of the dam collapsed. Within 20 minutes, the floods, which were 12 to 30 ft (3.7 to 9.1 m) high, inundated the low-lying areas of Morbi industrial town, located 5 km (3.1 miles) below the dam.

Around 3.30 pm, the tremendous swirling flow of water struck Morbi. The water level rose to 30 feet (9.1 m) within the next 15 minutes and some low lying areas of city were under 20 feet (6.1 m) of water for the next 6 hours.

The Morbi dam failure was listed as the worst dam burst in the Guinness Book of Records before the death toll of the 1975 Banqiao Dam failure was declassified in 2005. The collapse led to great economic loss as the flood damaged farmland, leading to a decrease in productivity of crops.

No One Had A Tongue To Speak, by Tom Wooten and Utpal Sandesara, debunks the official claims that the dam failure was an act of God and points to structural and communication failures that led to and exacerbated the disaster. It contains first-person accounts of many survivors. It narrates how people scrambled for rooftops, hilltops, and other safe grounds in order to save themselves. Over a hundred people took shelter in Vajepar Ram Mandir but later, the deluge submerged them along with the temple. Women were compelled to drop their babies into the furious surge in order to save themselves and people lost their loved ones in a flash.

During reconstruction of the dam, the capacity of the spillway was increased by four times and fixed at about 21,000 m^{3}/s (740,000 cu ft/s).

== Popular culture ==
The Gujarati disaster film Machchhu tara vehta pani is based on the Machchhu dam failure.

== See also ==
- 2022 Morbi bridge collapse
