= Tankara =

Tankara Dayanand Nagar
- Town
- Location in Gujarat, India Tankara (India)
- Coordinates: 22.656°N 70.748°E
- Country: India
- State: Gujarat
- District: Morbi

Population
  - Total: 18,000

Languages
  - Official: Gujarati, Hindi
- Time zone: UTC+5:30 (IST)
- PIN: 363650
- Telephone code: 02822
- Vehicle registration: GJ-36
- Climate: BSh
- Website: gujaratindia.com

Tankara is a town in Morbi district in the Indian state of Gujarat. It is situated on the Demi River and on Rajkot-Morbi Highway, 20 kilometres from Morbi, 40 kilometres from Rajkot, and 80 kilometres from Jamnagar. Tankara is considered a holy city to Arya Samajis because it is the birthplace of Swami Dayananda Saraswati, founder of the Arya Samaj, who was born on 12 February 1824.

== Rishi Bodh Utsav ==
Every year on Maha Shivaratri, the Arya Samajis commemorate Swami Dayananda Sarasvati's Rishi Bodh Utsav during the 2 days mela at Tankara organised by Tankara Trust, during which Shobha Yatra procession and Maha Yajna is held, event is also attended by the Prime Minister of India Narendra Modi and Chief Minister of Gujarat Vijay Rupani.

== Industry ==
Tankara is famous for quality cotton bales production and has 25 to 30 cotton ginning factories and many cotton oil mills. Tankara is the fourth largest business centre in the field of cotton oil mill and ginning industries in Saurashtra and fifth in Gujarat. This industry is the fastest growing in this region. Tankara is also one of the major centres of silver imitation jewellery manufacturing. Tankara has been facing many basic infrastructure related problem such as: and with polypack industries production are pp woven fabric, pp non woven fabric and more manufacturer.

== Hospitals ==
In Tankara Health services are primarily provided at government hospital and many private hospitals.

== List of villages in Tankara ==
- Amrapar (tol)
- Bangavadi
- Bedi
- Bhutkotda
- Chhattar
- Devaliya
- Dhroliya
- Ganeshpar
- Ghunada
- Khanpar
- Hadala
- Hadmatiya
- Hamirpar
- Harbatiyali
- Haripar
- Hirapar
- Jabalpur
- Jainagar
- Jivapartankara
- Jodhpar (zala)
- Kagdadi
- Kalyanpar
- Khakhra
- Kothariya
- Lajai
- Lakhdhir Gadh
- Meghpar Zala
- Mitana
- Mota Khijadiya
- Nana Khijadiya
- Nana Rampar*ramnagar*(part of rampar)
- Nasitpar
- Neknam
- Nesda
- Khanpar
- Nesda
- Surji
- Otala
- Rajavad
- Rohishala
- Sajanpar
- Sakhpar
- Saraya
- Savdi
- Tankara
- Tol
- Umiyanagar
- Vachhakpar
- Vaghgadh
- Vijaynagar
- Virpar
- Virvav
