= Digvijaysinh Jhala =

Indian politician (1932–2024)

Union Minister of Ecology & Environment
- In office 1982–1984
- Prime Minister: Indira Gandhi

Member of Parliament, Lok Sabha
- In office 1980–1989
- Constituency: Surendranagar, Gujarat

MLA of Gujarat State
- In office 1962–1972
- Constituency: Wankaner

Personal details
- Born: 20 August 1932 Wankaner Taluka, Rajkot District, British India
- Died: 4 April 2021 (aged 88)
- Party: Indian National Congress
- Children: Kesridevsinh Jhala

Digvijaysinh Pratapsinhji Jhala (20 August 1932 – 4 April 2021) was an Indian politician from Gujarat. He served as India's first environment minister in the central government.

== Early life ==
Jhala was born at Ranjit Vilas Palace at Wankaner on 20 August 1932, the eldest son of Pratapsinhji Jhala of the princely state of Wankaner, by his wife, Sisodiji Maharani Sri Rama Kanwar Sahiba.

He was educated at Rajkumar College, Rajkot and graduated from Cambridge University, and obtained a doctorate from Delhi University's St Stephen's College.

== Family ==
In 1955, Jhala married Maharajkumari Baiji Lal Pratap Kumari Sahiba, eldest daughter of Sir Tej Singhji, Maharaja of Alwar State. Jhala married again in 1982, to Vibha Singh, daughter of a senior bureaucrat and diplomat Shri Bhagwan Singh. She was media personality and also served as a consul general of Nauru. Jhala and Vibha's only son, Kesarisihji, was born in 1983. Kesarisihji is nominated as Rajysabha Member of Parliament from Bharatiya Janta Party and elections are awaiting.

== Wankaner State ==
Jhala was heir apparent to the throne of the princely state of Wankaner at birth, holding the title Yuvraj Sahib of Wankaner officially from 1932, when the State merged with newly independent India. He succeeded his father in 2007 as the titular King of Wankaner and head of its royal house.

== Political career ==
Jhala entered politics after the independence of India and joined the Indian National Congress. He was a Member of Legislative Assembly for Wankaner in the Gujarat Legislative Assembly for the years 1962-67 and 1967–71. He was then elected Member of Parliament for Surendranagar for two terms, from 1980 to 1989. He also served as the Union Deputy Minister for Ecology and the Environment from 1982 to 1984.

== Personal life ==
Being very active in public life, Jhala was also Convener of the Indian Heritage Hotels Association, Gujarat, Chairman of Gujarat Hotels Association and President of the Wankaner Co-op Agricultural Bank Ltd for 1962–1964.

He was Director of Shree Amarsinhji Mills Ltd since 1960, a cotton textile mill founded in 1951 by his grandfather Sir Amarsinhji Banesinhji, which was later taken over by Kores India in 1980.

He served as a director of India Tourism Development Corporation for the years 1968–1982.

He was a founder member of the Indigenous Horse Society of India founded in 1999. He was also a member of the Gujarat State Water Pollution Control Board since 1976, National Committee for Environmental Planning since 1981 and president of the Akhil Bharatiya Kshatriya Mahasabha since 1989.

Jhala died on 4 April 2021 at the age of 88, after a brief illness.

== See also ==
- MK Ranjitsinh Jhala
