= Durlabhji Dethariya =

Indian politician

Durlabhji Dethariya (born 1959) is an Indian politician from Gujarat. He is a member of the Gujarat Legislative Assembly from Tankara Assembly constituency in Morbi district. He won the 2022 Gujarat Legislative Assembly election, representing the Bharatiya Janata Party.

== Early life and education ==
Dethariya is from Tankara, Morbi district, Gujarat. He is the son of Harakhjibhai Dethariya. He passed Class 10. He is a businessman and his wife is also into family business.

== Career ==
Dethariya won from Tankara Assembly constituency representing the Bharatiya Janata Party in the 2022 Gujarat Legislative Assembly election. He polled83,274 votes and defeated his nearest rival, Lalit Kagathara of the Indian National Congress, by a margin of 10,256 votes.
