= Lincoln House (Mumbai) =

Heritage property in Mumbai, India

Coordinates: 18°58′10″N 72°48′12″E

Lincoln House, owned by Indian army, is a 50,000 sq foot heritage property located at 78, Bhulabhai Desai Road, in the billionaires row of Mumbai, India.

== Property history ==
A Grade-III listed mansion designed 1933 by British architect Claude Batley, the property was originally built for the Maharaja of Wankaner, HH Sir Amarsinhji Banesinhji and his son Pratapsinhji Jhala. From 1957 the property was leased to the U.S. Government and served as the Consulate General of the United States in Mumbai.

In September 2015 it was sold for a reported Rs 7.5 billion (US$ 113 million), to Cyrus Poonawalla, Chairman of the Poonawalla Group, who plans to use the property as a family home. Although selling below the reserve price, the September 2015 purchase was reported as the most expensive residential property transaction in India's history. However, legal disputes over ownership between the US and Indian governments as well as Maharashtra authorities have held up the sale of the property and ownership has not been transferred as of 2023.
