= Jerry Tardieu =

Haitian politician

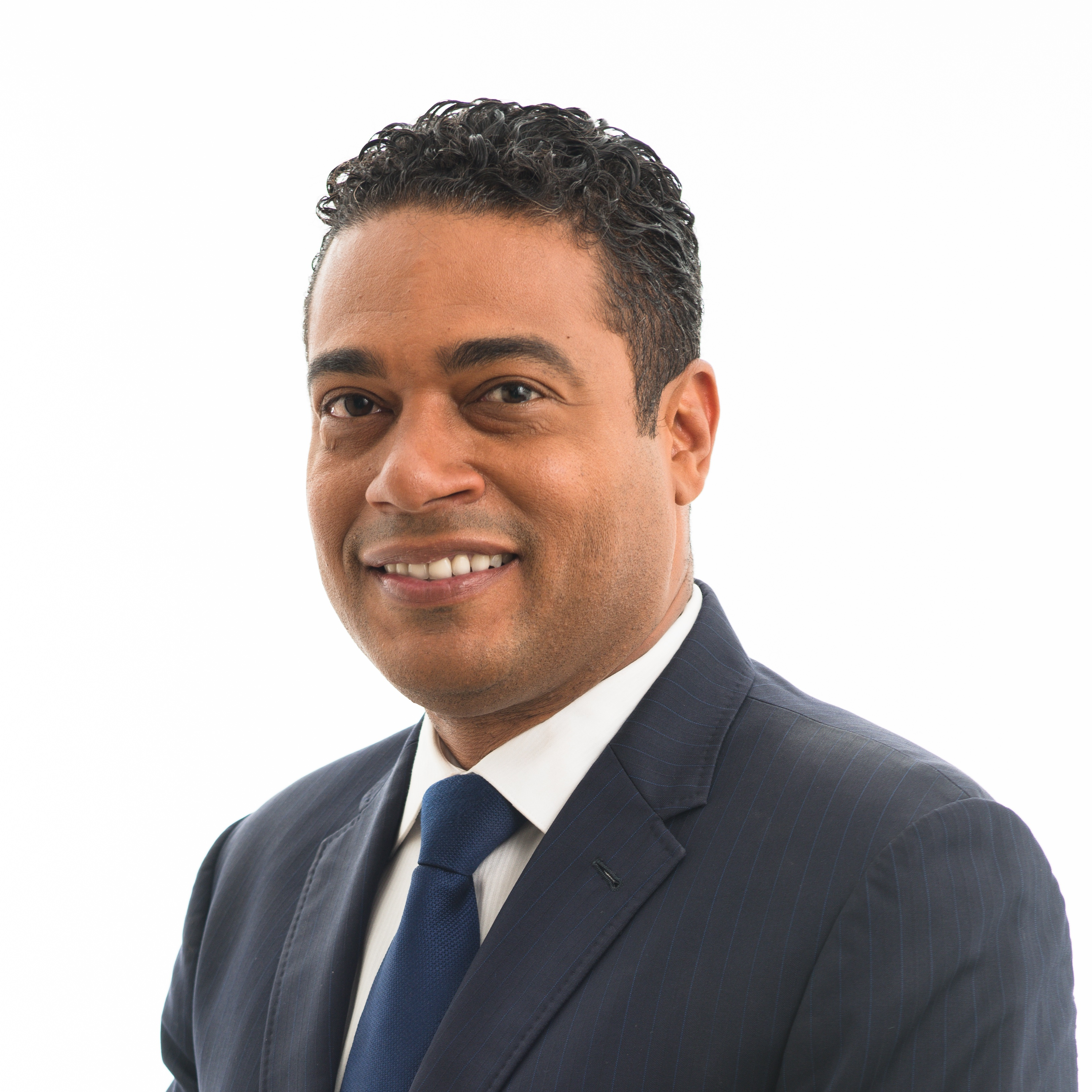
- Born: Jerry Tardieu; 13 July 1967 (age 59); Port-au-Prince, Haïti
- Education: Harvard Kennedy School; Université Européenne de Bruxelles
- Occupations: Founder & CEO of Royal Oasis, Investor, entrepreneur, writer
- Term: Député de Pétion-Ville 2016 - 2020
- Political party: En Avant Haiti
- Website: jerrytardieu.com , www.enavant.ht

Jerry Tardieu (né Marie Gerard Philippe Tardieu; born 13 July 1967) is a Haitian author, entrepreneur, and former Congressman of Petion-Ville in the Chamber of Deputies.

== Biography ==
Tardieu's family made their fortune in shipping and in real estate. In Haiti, he studied at Institution Saint-Louis de Gonzague before earning a degree from European University College, followed by a master's degree in Public Administration from Harvard University. There is a history of political service on both sides of his family: his paternal grandfather was elected to the Chamber of Deputies and his maternal great-grandfather had been War Minister during the presidency of Michel Oreste. Jerry Tardieu is the founder of “Kolektif Abitan Petyonvil"

== Books ==
- L'avenir en face. Haïti à l'épreuve de la mondialisation et du défaitisme de ses élites. (2005) Montréal: Les Editions du CIDIHCA.
- Investir et S'investir en Haïti, un acte de foi. (2014) Montréal: Les Editions du CIDIHCA.
- Dans l'enfer du parlement: quatre années de combat et des idées pour demain (2020)
