= MK Ranjitsinh Jhala =

Indian environmentalist and prince

- Born: 19 February 1939 (age 87); India
- Occupations: Author, Chairman of the Wildlife Trust of India
- Awards: Lifetime achievement award

Dr. MK Ranjitsinh Jhala (born 19 February 1939) (Note: M. K. stands for Maharaj Kumar) is an author and authority on wildlife and nature conservation from India.

== Personal life ==
He comes from the royal family of Wankaner in Saurashtra.He is a scion of the Jhala dynasty from the former princely state of Wankaner and younger brother of Digvijaysinh Jhala. He was born at Ranjit Vilas Palace at Wankaner on 19 February 1939 and is the second son of erstwhile titular Maharaja of Wankaner, Captain H.H. Maharana Raj Shri Pratapsinhji Sahib, by his wife, H.H. Sisodiji Maharani Sri Rama Kanwar Sahiba and is grandson of HH Sir Amarsinhji Banesinhji, the last ruler of Wankaner State.

== Career ==
He joined Indian Administrative Services in 1961 and served in various important posts like Secretary for Forests & Tourism in Madhaya Pradesh 1970-1973, Director Wildlife Preservation 1973–1975. He is author of several books on Indian wildlife and conservation like - "The Indian Blackbuck" (1989), "Indian Wildlife" (1995), "Beyond the Tiger: Portraits of Asian Wildlife" (1997) and others.

He served also as Chairman of the Wildlife Trust of India (WTI); Dir-Gen CAPART; Dir. and Regional Co-ordinator WWF Tiger Conservation Programme (TCP). Regional Adviser in Nature Conservation (Asia & Pacific) for UNEP. Trustee The Corbett Foundation, member National Forest Commission, Indian Institute of Forest Management Society, International Tropical Timber Organization, Madhya Pradesh State Wildlife Board until 2006.

His most noted works are drafting of Wildlife (Protection) Act, 1972 of India and demarcating many forest as wildlife sanctuaries. Further, reintroduction of the cheetah in India as a policy was implemented upon advisory papers submitted by MK Ranjitsinh Jhala and Divyabhanusinh Chavda. They presented their papers after through research on how to go about bringing cheetahs back to India.

He was awarded lifetime achievement award in 2014 for his works in conservation of wildlife.
