= Samarjitsinh Gaekwad =

Indian cricket administrator (born 1967)

Samarjitsinh Ranjitsinh Gaekwad
- Pretender
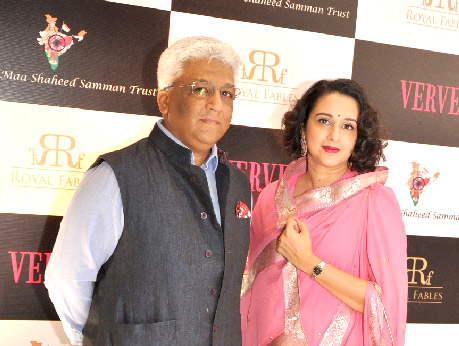
- Samarjitsinh Gaekwad with his wife Radhikaraje in 2017
- Spouse: Radhikaraje
- Predecessor: Ranjitsinh Pratapsinh Gaekwad
- Cricket career

Personal information
- Born: 25 April 1967 (age 59); Baroda, Gujarat, India
- Batting: Right-handed
- Relatives: See Gaekwad dynasty

Domestic team information
- Years: Team
- 1987/88–1988/89: Baroda

Career statistics
Competition	First-class
Matches	6
Runs scored	119
Batting average	17.00
100s/50s	0/1
Top score	65
Catches/stumpings	3/–
- Source: ESPNcricinfo, 7 September 2019

Samarjitsinh Ranjitsinh Gaekwad (born 25 April 1967) is a cricket administrator and former first-class cricketer. Gaekwad is a descendant of the erstwhile royal family of the princely state of Baroda in India.

== Early life and family ==
Samarjitsinh was born on 25 April 1967 as the only son of Ranjitsinh Pratapsinh Gaekwad and Shubhanginiraje. He studied at The Doon School in Dehradun where he simultaneously captained the school's cricket, football and tennis teams.

After the death of his father in May 2012, Samarjitsinh was "crowned" in a traditional ceremony at Laxmi Vilas Palace on 22 June 2012. He settled a 23-year-long legal inheritance dispute worth more than ₹20,000 crore (equivalent to ₹370 billion or US$4.0 billion in 2026) (~ US$3 billion in 2013) with his uncle Sangramsinh Gaekwad in 2013. Through the deal, Samarjitsinh secured ownership of Laxmi Vilas Palace, over 600 acres (240 ha) of real estate near the palace including Moti Bagh Stadium and Maharaja Fateh Singh Museum, several paintings by Raja Ravi Varma as well as movable assets belonging to Fatehsinghrao such as gold, silver and royal jewelry. He also obtained control of temples trust that operates 17 temples in Gujarat and in Banaras, Uttar Pradesh.

== Personal life ==
Since 2002, Samarjitsinh is married to Radhikaraje, who is a descendant of the erstwhile royal family of Wankaner State; the couple has two daughters. The four of them, along with Shubhanginiraje, live in the Laxmi Vilas Palace, which is the largest private residence in India. He opened a section of the palace complex as a banquet facility for private ceremonies under his Laxmi Vilas Banquets venture.

He received the larger portion of the family's fortune in a 2013 settlement.

Samarjitsinh joined the Bharatiya Janata Party in November 2014, but is inactive in politics as of 2017.

== Cricket career ==
Samarjitsinh played cricket for Baroda in the Ranji Trophy. He appeared in six first-class matches as a top-order batsman between the 1987/88 and 1988/89 seasons. He later became a cricket administrator and served as the president of the Baroda Cricket Association. As of 2015, he runs a cricket academy at the Moti Bagh Stadium. Apart from cricket, he played golf and built a 10-hole golf course and clubhouse at the Laxmi Vilas Palace complex.
