= Ajanta Oreva Group =

Group of companies

- Trade name: Ajanta Manufacturing Private Limited
- Type: Private
- Industry: Textiles; Transport; Construction; Machinery
- Founded: 1971; 55 years ago
- Founder: Odhavaji Raghavji Patel
- Headquarters: Ahmedabad, Gujarat, India
- Key people: Jaysukh Patel (Managing Director)
- Products: Lighting products; Electric vehicles; Home appliances; Telephones; LED televisions; Clocks
- Revenue: ₹800 Crore
- Number of employees: 5000 (2022)
- Website: shoporeva.com

Ajanta Group or Oreva Group (stylized as OREVA) is a diversified Indian conglomerate, active in textiles, transport, construction equipment, and machinery.

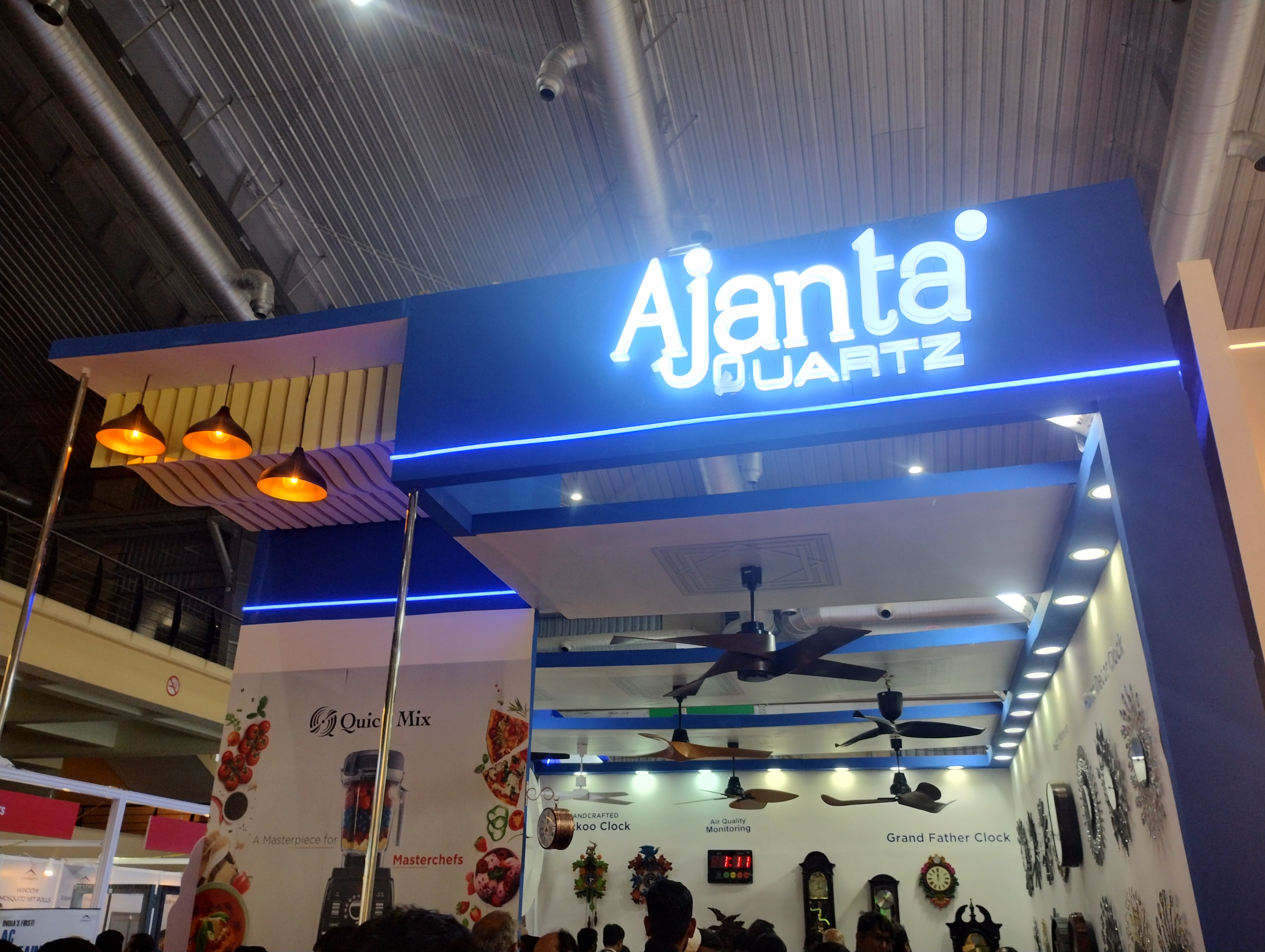
Ajanta Quartz at Acetech 2025, BIEC

== History ==
The company was founded by Odhavaji Raghavji Patel in 1971. It is known for the manufacturing clocks.

In 2008, the company unsuccessfully tried to enter the automotive industry with the Oreva Super, a low-cost electric car. It was dubbed "Tata Nano-Killer," reportedly costing less than INR 100,000 or roughly around $1,400.

== Ajanta Energy ==
Ajanta Energy Pvt. Ltd. specializes in renewable energy.

Ajanta Energy provides solar power systems, windmills, and energy efficiency services.

== Controversies ==
In 2022, the company and its staff were investigated for the collapse of a bridge in Morbi. The Municipality of Morbi owned the bridge, and entered into a 15-year maintenance agreement with Oreva Group. Initial reports say that the bridge opened to the public ahead of schedule after temporary repairs, even though no 'certificate of fitness' from the local authorities had been obtained.
