= Tankara Assembly constituency =

Legislative Assembly constituency in Gujarat State, India

Coordinates: 22.66°N 70.75°E

Tankara
- Constituency No. 66 for the Gujarat Legislative Assembly

Constituency details
- Country: India
- Region: Western India
- State: Gujarat
- District: Morbi
- Lok Sabha constituency: Rajkot
- Established: 1972
- Total electors: 249,585
- Reservation: None

Member of Legislative Assembly
- 15th Gujarat Legislative Assembly
- Incumbent Durlabhjibhai Harakhjibhai Dethariya
- Party: Bharatiya Janata Party
- Elected year: 2022

Tankara is one of the 182 Legislative Assembly constituencies of Gujarat state in India. It is part of Morbi district.

== List of segments ==
This assembly seat represents the following segments:

1. Tankara Taluka
2. Morbi Taluka (Part) Villages – Mansar, Naranka, Pipaliya, Virparda, Hajnali, Modpar, Lutavadar, Barvala, Khevaliya, Khakhrala, Vanaliya, Khareda, Andarna, Vankda, Pipali, Gor Khijadia, Jepur, Bagathala, Biliya, Kantipur, Manekvada, Nagalpar, Nani Vavdi, Ghuntu, Unchi Mandal, Nichi Mandal, Kalikanagar, Lakhdhirpur, Lalpar, Panchasar, Amrapar Nag, Moti Vavdi, Khanpar, Chanchapar, Thorala, Rajpar, Saktasanala, Jodhpur Nadi, Jambudiya, Paneli, Gidach, Makansar, Adepar, Lakhdhirnagar, Lilapar, Ghunada Sajanpar, Ravapara, Vajepar
3. Paddhari Taluka of Rajkot District – Entire taluka except villages – Khokhri, Jivapar
4. Lodhika Taluka (Part) of Rajkot District Village – Und Khijadiya
5. Dhrol Taluka (Part) of Jamnagar District Villages – Chhalla, Golita

== Members of Legislative Assembly ==
Year	Member	Party
1990	Keshubhai Patel	Bharatiya Janata Party
1995	Mohanbhai Kundariya	Bharatiya Janata Party
1998	Mohanbhai Kundariya	Bharatiya Janata Party
2002	Mohanbhai Kundariya	Bharatiya Janata Party
2007	Mohanbhai Kundariya	Bharatiya Janata Party
2012	Mohanbhai Kundariya	Bharatiya Janata Party
2014 (By Poll)	Bavanjibhai Metaliya	Bharatiya Janata Party
2017	Lalitbhai Kagathara	Indian National Congress
2022	Durlabhjibhai Harakhjibhai Dethariya	Bharatiya Janata Party

== Election results ==
=== 2022 ===
2022 Gujarat Legislative Assembly election: Tankara
Party	Candidate	Votes	%	±%
BJP	Durlabhji Dethariya	83,274	46.6	
INC	Kagathara Lalitbhai	73018	40.86	
AAP	Sanjay Bhatasna	17834	9.98	
NOTA	None of the above	1993	1.12	
Majority		10256	5.74	
Turnout		176119	71.73	
Registered electors		245,594		
BJP gain from INC		Swing		

=== 2017 ===
Gujarat Legislative Assembly Election, 2017: Tankara
Party	Candidate	Votes	%	±%
INC	Lalitbhai Karamshibhai Kagathara	94,090	56.29	
BJP	Raghavajibhai Gadara	64,320	38.48	
Majority		29,770		
Turnout		1,67,162	74.43	
INC gain from BJP		Swing		

=== 2014 by-poll ===
By Election, 2014: Tankara
Party	Candidate	Votes	%	±%
BJP	Bavanjibhai Hansrajbhai Metaliya	65,833	52.34	
INC	Lalitbhai Karamshibhai Kagathara	54,102	43.02	
IND.	Dilipbhai Talsibhai Savaliya	1,512	1.20	
IND.	Dayabhai Dalsukhbhai Fefar	868	0.69	
JD(U)	Babudas Chhagandas Kubavat	861	0.68	
NOTA	None of the Above	2,068	1.64	
Majority		11,731	9.32	
Turnout		1,25,766	60.22	
BJP hold		Swing		

=== 2012 ===
Gujarat Legislative Assembly Election, 2012: Tankara
Party	Candidate	Votes	%	±%
BJP	Mohanbhai Kalyanjibhai Kundariya	63,630	42.42	
INC	Maganbhai Dhanjibhai Vadaviya	48,223	32.15	
IND.	Lalitbhai Karamshibhai Kagathara	15,746	10.50	
GPP	Dhirajlal Kanjibhai Bhimani	11,051	7.37	
IND.	Ramjibhai Jivabhai Rathod	3,432	2.29	
BSP	Hamirbhai Sagarambhai Toliya	3,283	2.19	
Majority		15,407	10.27	
Turnout		1,49,985	76.26	
BJP hold		Swing		

== See also ==
- List of constituencies of the Gujarat Legislative Assembly
- Morbi district
