= Gaslight (2023 film) =

2023 Indian film by Pavan Kirpalani

- Official release poster
- Directed by: Pavan Kirpalani
- Written by: Neha Veena Sharma; Pavan Kirpalani
- Produced by: Ramesh S. Taurani; Akshai Puri
- Starring: Vikrant Massey; Sara Ali Khan; Chitrangada Singh
- Cinematography: Ragul Dharuman
- Edited by: Chandan Arora
- Music by: Gaurav Chatterji
- Production companies: Tips Industries; 12th Street Entertainment
- Distributed by: Disney+ Hotstar
- Release date: 31 March 2023
- Running time: 111 minutes
- Country: India
- Language: Hindi

Gaslight is a 2023 Indian Hindi-language mystery-thriller film, directed by Pavan Kirpalani and produced by Ramesh Taurani and Akshai Puri. The film stars Vikrant Massey, Sara Ali Khan and Chitrangada Singh. It was released on 31 March 2023 on Disney+ Hotstar.

== Plot ==
The movie begins with Meesha, a young woman who uses a wheelchair, returning to her royal family estate after receiving a letter from her father, Raja Sahib, asking her to visit. However, when she arrives, she discovers that her father is missing. Her stepmother, Rukmani, and the palace staff claim he has gone away on business, but Meesha finds their explanations suspicious.

As strange incidents occur in the palace, Meesha believes she sees her father wandering the halls at night. Determined to uncover the truth, she investigates with the help of Kapil, a trusted palace employee. Their search reveals hidden secrets, conflicting stories, and evidence suggesting that Raja Sahib may have been murdered.

The mystery deepens with several twists. Eventually, it is revealed that the woman everyone believes to be Meesha is actually Fatima, Meesha's close friend. The real Meesha had died years earlier in an accident involving Raja Sahib. Fatima had assumed Meesha's identity as part of a plan connected to revenge and the palace's dark secrets.

In the climax, the truth behind Raja Sahib's death and the deception surrounding Meesha's identity comes to light. The guilty parties are exposed, and the mystery is finally solved.

== Cast ==
- Vikrant Massey as Kapil
- Sara Ali Khan as Meesha Singh Gaikwad aka Meeshri/ Fatima
  - Mannat Duggal as Young Fatima
- Sonia Mehmi as Real Meesha
- Chitrangada Singh as Rukmani
- Akshay Oberoi as Rana Jai Singh alias 'RJ'
- Rahul Dev as SP Ashok Tanwar
- Shishir Sharma as Dr. Shekhawat
- Shataf Figar as Ratan Singh Gaikwad alias 'Daata' / 'Raja Saheb'
- Ashmita Jaggi as Meesha Singh Gaikwad
- Shivika Rishi as Young Meesha
- Manjiri Pupala as the blind psychic
- Vinod Kumar Sharma as Padam

== Production ==
The principal photography commenced in February 2022 in Ranjit Vilas Palace, Wankaner and completed in just 36 days. The second schedule of the film was shot in and around Mumbai; with underwater sections being shot in Khopoli.

== Release ==
It was released on 31 March 2023 on the OTT platform Disney+ Hotstar in Hindi.

== Reception ==
Gaslight received mixed to negative reviews from critics. It was criticized for Khan's performance, weak and old storyline but there were praises showered for the horror scenes and the atmospheric cinematography and production design; as well as for the performances by the actors (particularly Massey and Singh).

Bollywood Hungama rated the film 2.5 out of 5 stars by calling its narration slow and clichéed but appreciated the cast's performance and the unpredictable climax.

The Indian Express rated the film 1.5 out of 5 stars and wrote that the film fails to dial up the dread, but appreciation to Akshay Oberoi's performance. Times Now rated the film 2 out of 5 stars and wrote that film is packed up with twist and turns but still cannot give an 'edge of the seat thriller'. The Hindu critiqued it negatively as "A murder mystery that invests more in mood than matter, Gaslight sparks interest with its setting and sharp twists but eventually turns out to be a rather insipid whodunit."
