= Vavdi =

Vavdi may refer to the following places in Gujarat, western India :

- Vavdi Dharvala, a town and former Rajput princely state in Gohelwar, Kathiawar
- Vavdi Vachhani, a village in Sihor Taluka, Bhavnagar District, and former Rajput princely state in Gohelwar
- Vavdi Gajabhai, a village, also in Sihor Taluka
- Vavdi, another village, in Kheda Taluka, Kheda District
- Moti Vavdi, a village in Morbi Taluka, Morbi District
- Nani Vavdi, a village in Morbi Taluka, Morbi District
