= Vavdi Dharvala =

Human settlement in Gujarat, India

Vavdi Dharvala is a town and former Rajput non-salute princely state in Gujarat, western India.

== History ==
Vavdi Dharvala was a minor princely state, in the Gohelwar prant of Kathiawar, also comprising three more villages, ruled by Gohel Rajput Chieftains.

It had a combined population of 2,007 in 1901, yielding a state revenue of 11,000 Rupees (1903–4, nearly all from land) and a paying a tribute of 1,530 Rupees, to the Gaekwar Baroda State and Junagadh State.

== See also ==
- Vavdi (disambiguation) for (near-)namesakes

== External links and Sources ==
History

- Imperial Gazetteer, on dsal.uchicago.edu
