= Demi River =

Demi

Location
- Country: India
- State: Gujarat

Physical characteristics
- Source
  - location: India
- Mouth
  - location: Arabian Sea, India
- Length: 75 km (47 mi)
- Discharge
  - location: Arabian Sea

The Demi River is a river in Saurashtra region of Gujarat, India.

Its basin has a maximum length of 75 km. The total catchment area of the basin is 813 square kilometres (314 sq mi). Demi-1, Demi-2 and Demi-3 are dams on this river. Tankara city is situated on the bank of Demi river near its confluence with Asandra.
