= Maliya, Morbi =

Maliya
- Location in Gujarat
- Coordinates: 23.094°N 70.758°E
- Country: India
- State: Gujarat
- District: Junagadh district

Population (2011)
  - Total: 15,964

Languages
  - Official: Gujarati
- Time zone: UTC+5:30 (IST)

Maliya is a town in Morbi district of Gujarat state of India. Before the establishment of Morbi district on 15 August 2013, Maliya was a part of Rajkot district.

== See also ==
- Morbi district
