= Waghji II Rawaji =

Thakore of Morvi (1870 - 1922)

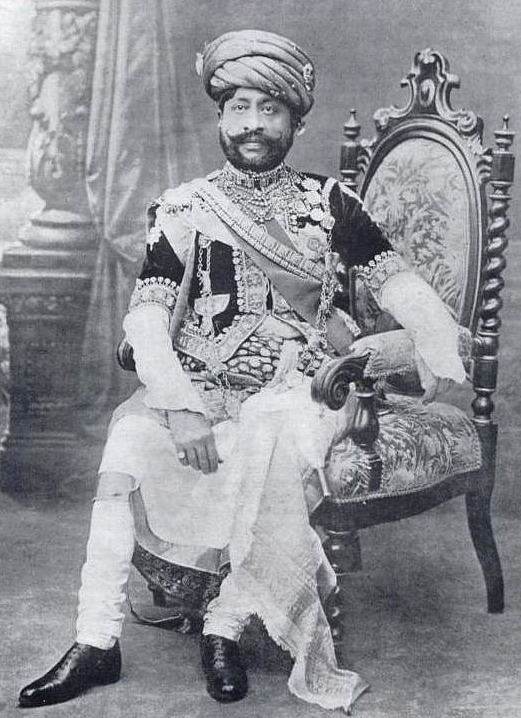

Thakore of Morvi
- Reign: 17 February 1870 – 11 June 1922
- Predecessor: Rawaji II Prithirajji
- Successor: Lakhdirji Waghji
- Born: 7 April 1858
- Died: 11 June 1922 (aged 64)
- Spouse: Bajirajba Kunverba
- Issue Detail: Lakhdhirji Waghji; Ajitsinhji Waghji; Chandrasinhji Waghji; Shivsinhji Waghji; Amarsinhji Waghji; Pratapsinhji Waghji
- House: Morvi
- Dynasty: Jadeja
- Father: Rawaji II Prithirajji
- Education: Rajkumar College, Rajkot

Waghji II Rawaji was the Thakore of Morvi from 1870 until his death in 1922.

== Early life, family, and education ==
He was born on 7 April 1858 to Rawaji II Prithirajji. He was educated at Rajkumar College, Rajkot, where he remained for six years, and was among its first students. On leaving the college in 1876, he donated the sum of Rs. 30,000 to his alma mater for the Endowment Fund of the college. He married Bajirajba Kunverba, who was from Palitana, and, apart from her, he had a few other wives. He had issue, six sons, namely Lakhdhirji Waghji, Ajitsinhji Waghji, Chandrasinhji Waghji, Shivsinhji Waghji, Amarsinhji Waghji, and Pratapsinhji Waghji.

== Reign ==
Upon the death of his father on 17 February 1870, he succeeded him as the Thakore of Morvi, but on account of his minority at the time, the State was placed under the council of administration. This council consisted of Shambu Prasad Laxmilal and Azam Jhunjhabhai Sakhidas. They both carried on the administration on his behalf for a total of nine years. In 1877 and 1878, he made a tour of India under the charge of Capt. Humfrey, after which he served as joint administrator with Shambu Prasad for one year. He was invested with full administrative powers on 1 January 1879. The first thing he did after assuming the reins of government was to build a bridge over the Machchhu river. This bridge cost £30,000 and was opened in 1879. He made a tour through Europe and America under the charge of W.H. White in 1883.

== Death ==
Waghji died on 11 June 1922 and was succeeded by his eldest son, Lakhdhirji Waghji.
