= Kalyanpar =

- village
- Country: India
- State: Gujarat
- District: Morbi

Population
  - Total: 1,856

Languages
  - Official: Gujarati, Hindi
- Time zone: IST
- PIN: 363650
- Vehicle registration: GJ 36
- Website: gujaratindia.com

Kalyanpar is a village located in the Morbi district in the Indian state of Gujarat, India. The village is 3 km from center Tankara. Many industries like Cotton Ginning factories, Cotton Seed oil Mills, Polypack etc. are located here.
