= Banesinhji Jaswantsinhji =

Maharana of Wankaner from 1860 to 1881

H.H. Maharana Raj Shri Banesinhji Jaswantsinhji Sahib (1842 – 12 June 1881) was the Maharana Raj Sahib of Wankaner belonging to Jhala dynasty, who ascended the throne of princely state of Wankaner in 1860 upon death of his grandfather, Maharana Raj Shri Wakhatsinhji Chandrasinhji and ruled until his death in 1881. His father Kumar Shri Jaswantsinhji Vakhatsinhji Sahib was the eldest son of Maharana Raj Shri Wakhatsinhji Chandrasinhji, who died in 1844. He was succeeded by his son, Amarsinhji Banesinhji. He was educated privately and was a progressive and modern ruler who introduced the first reforms and innovations in administrations, revenue collection, justice, public works and police matters. Unfortunately, much of his reign was spent in battling against the twin scourges of drought and famine. He was recipient of Prince of Wales' Medal - 1875, and Kaiser-i-Hind Medal - 1877.
