= 2019 Mumbai foot overbridge collapse =

Footbridge collapse in Mumbai, India

- Foot overbridge (Mumbai) Location of bridge collapse
- Date: 14 March 2019
- Location: Fort, Mumbai, India; 18.942203°N 72.834660°E
- Deaths: 6
- Injuries: At least 30-32

On 14 March 2019, in Mumbai city of India, a part of a foot overbridge connecting the north end of the Chhatrapati Shivaji Maharaj Terminus (CSMT) railway station to Badaruddin Tayabji Lane collapsed and fell on the road. Six people died and at least 30 others were injured in the accident.

== Background ==
The foot overbridge connects the north end of Chhatrapati Shivaji Maharaj Terminus (CSMT) railway station to Badaruddin Tayabji Lane. It is maintained by the Brihanmumbai Municipal Corporation (BMC). The structural audit and minor repairs of the foot overbridge was carried out six months before the collapse.

In July 2018, G. K. Gokhale Road overbridge in Andheri had collapsed after heavy rain resulting in death of two people. After the incident, 445 bridges were audited for the safety. In September 2017, a stampede broke out on a narrow footbridge at the Prabhadevi railway station resulting in at least 23 deaths.

== Incident ==
On 14 March 2019, around 7:30 pm IST, a part of bridge collapsed on Dr. Dadabhai Naoroji Road. Due peak hours, there were a large number of vehicles on the road and people on the bridge when it collapsed. Six people died in the accident and at least 30 others were injured. The traffic on J. J. flyover going north was affected. The injured were admitted to the Saint George's Hospital and Gokuldas Tejpal Hospital. The remaining part of the foot overbridge was demolished.

The Government of Maharashtra announced the ex gratia of ₹5 lakh (US$5,200) to next of kin of each person died and ₹50,000 (US$520) to the injured.

== Investigation ==
The collapse will be investigated by the BMC and Central Railways. The preliminary report of the BMC noted that there was an improper structural audit of the foot overbridge. It also noted that the officers had no records of any supervision or inspection during its repair or audit. The structural engineer who audited the bridge and two officers of the bridge department of the BMC were arrested and the complaints against them were filed by the police.

== See also ==
- 2022 Morbi bridge collapse
