= Vavdi Vachhani =

Human settlement in Gujarat, India

Vavdi Vachhani is a town and former Rajput non-salute princely state in Gujarat, western India.

== History ==
Vavdi Vachhani was a minor princely state, in the Gohelwar prant of Kathiawar, also comprising two more villages, ruled by Gohel Rajput Chieftains.

It had a combined population of 490 in 1901, yielding a state revenue of 3,300 Rupees (1903–4, nearly all from land) and a paying a tribute of 334 Rupees, to the Gaekwar Baroda State and Junagadh State. now in bhavnagar district

== See also ==
- Vavdi (disambiguation) for (near-)namesakes

== External links and Sources ==
History

- Imperial Gazetteer, on dsal.uchicago.edu
