= Jugalji Thakor =

Indian Bharatiya Janata Party politician

Member of Rajya Sabha
- In office 5 July 2019 – 18 August 2023
- Preceded by: Smriti Irani
- Succeeded by: Kesridevsinh Jhala
- Constituency: Gujarat

Personal details
- Born: Jugalji Mathurji Thakor (Jugalji Lokhandwala)
- Party: Bharatiya Janata Party

Jugalji Mathurji Thakor is an Indian politician and a member of the Bharatiya Janata Party. He is the member of the Parliament of India representing Gujarat State in the Rajya Sabha, the upper house on 5 July 2019.
