= Mahendrasinhji =

Maharaja of Morvi (1948–1957)

- Maharaja

Maharaja of Morvi
- Reign: 21 January 1948 – 17 August 1957
- Predecessor: Lakhdhirji Waghji
- Successor: Mayurdhwajsinhji
- Born: 1 January 1918
- Died: 17 August 1957 (aged 39); Ascot, Berkshire, England
- Wives: Mohini Kunverba (m. 1932); Sudhir Kunverba; Vijay Kunverba (m. 1945)
- Issue: Mayurdhwajsinhji; Draupati Devi; Uma Devi; Raukshani Devi; Harshad Purna Devi
- Father: Lakhdhirji Waghji
- Mother: Kesar Kunverba
- Education: Rajkumar College, Rajkot; St. Mary's School, Mumbai; Bradfield College

Mahendrasinhji (1 January 1918 – 17 August 1957) was Maharaja of Morvi from 21 January 1948 until his death in 1957.

== Early life, family, and education ==
He was born on 1 January 1918 to Lakhdhirji Waghji and his third wife, Kesar Kunverba, daughter of Sarvaiya Bawaji Ranaji, the talukdar of Ranigam and Datha. He was educated in India and England. He studied at Rajkumar College in Rajkot, St. Mary's School in Mumbai, and Bradfield College in Berkshire. Following which, he underwent training in the various departments of the state administration. Mahendrasinhji married firstly, in 1932, to Mohini Kunverba of Rajpipla; secondly, to Sudhir Kunverba of Bansda; and thirdly, in 1945, to Vijay Kunverba. He had one son, Mayurdhwajsinhji, and four daughters: Draupati Devi, Uma Devi, Raukshani Devi, and Harshad Purna Devi.

He commissioned New Palace, Morbi, in 1931.

== Reign ==
When his father abdicated the throne of Morvi on 21 January 1948 in his favour, he succeeded to his title, rank and dignity. On 23 January 1948, he signed the covenant to merge his state into the United State of Kathiawar. On 26 February 1948, he granted the village of Mota Dahisara as a jagir to his mother. In April 1949, he began to pay his father a monthly allowance and continued to do so until his father's death.

== Death ==
He died on 17 August 1957 in Ascot and was succeeded by Mayurdhwajsinhji to his title, rank and dignity.
