= Pratapsinhji Amarsinhji =

Last Maharana of Wankaner from 1954–1971

Captain Maharana Raj Shri Pratapsinhji Sahib (12 April 1907 – 4 June 2007) was last official Maharana Raj Sahib of Wankaner belonging to Jhala dynasty from 28 June 1954 till 28 December 1971, when India abolished official symbols of princely India, including titles, privileges, and remuneration, privy purses. He was son of Captain Maharana Raj Shri Sir Amarsinhji Banesinhji Sahib, the Maharana Raj Sahib of Wankaner.

He was educated at Rajkumar College, Rajkot and later moved to England for further studies and studied at Cheltenham College, Gloucestershire and Cambridge University. Upon his return he joined Officer-in-charge of the Revenue Department of Wankaner State - 1929–1931, and the Treasury Office 1931–1932. He took over the title of Maharana Raj Sahib of Wankaner upon the death of his father, 28 June 1954 and held the title till was abolished by Government of India on 28 December 1971.

He was founder member of Cricket Club of India and a member of Bombay Natural History Society. He served as Chairman of governing body of Rajkumar College, Rajkot. He received the Silver Jubilee Medal (1935) and the Coronation Medal (1937), and the Sri Saktimat Makhapraphulla Order of Jhalavad 1st class.

He was director of Amrasinhji Mills of Wankaner. He converted his Ranjit Vilas Palace at Wankaner into a luxury hotel. He sold his Wankaner House at Mumbai, a decision which he later regretted.

He is father of Digvijaysinh Jhala and MK Ranjitsinh Jhala. He died in 2007 at age of 100.
