= Odhavaji Raghavji Patel =

Known as father of wall clocks

Odhavji Raghavji Patel
- Born: Odhavji Raghavji Bhalodiya; 24 June 1925; Morbi, Bombay State, British India (now in Gujarat, India)
- Died: 18 October 2012 (aged 87); Morbi, Gujarat, India
- Occupations: Founder of Ajanta Group, Oreva Group, Orpat Group, Teacher
- Spouse: Revaben Patel
- Children: 6; (4 sons and 2 daughters)

Odhavji Raghavji Patel "ORPatel" known as father of wall clocks and popularly known as ORPatel was an Indian business tycoon who founded Ajanta Group, Orpat Group and Oreva Group which are sold in 45 countries across the globe.

== Business ==
Patel having started the business of manufacturing wall clocks in the year of 1971, later he entered into various other businesses like manufacturing calculators, educational toys, telephones, multimeters, etc. which was incorporated as a part of the Ajanta Group under the name Ellora Time Private Limited on 4 December 1989. As a part of Ajanta Group, another company named Ajanta Watch Limited was also incorporated in the year of 1989 which is now renamed as Ajanta India Limited.

== Death ==
Patel died on 18 October 2012 at the age of 87.
