= Amarsinhji Banesinhji =

Maharana Raj Sahib of Wankaner from 1881 to 1954

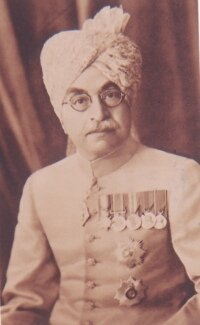

Maharana Raj Sahib of Wankaner
- Reign: 12 June 1881 – 28 June 1954
- Predecessor: Banesinhji Jaswantsinhji
- Successor: Pratapsinhji Amarsinhji
- Born: 4 January 1879
- Died: 28 June 1954 (aged 75)
- Father: Banesinhji Jaswantsinhji

Captain Sir Amarsinhji Banesinhji KCSI KCIE (4 January 1879 – 25 June 1954) was the Maharana Raj Sahib of Wankaner from 12 June 1881 until his death on 28 June 1954.

== Early life and education ==
Amarsinhji was born on 4 January 1879 to Banesinhji, whom he succeeded in his titles and dignity as Maharana Raj Sahib of Wankaner at the mere age of two, on 25 June 1881, in the presence of Colonel Nutt, the then Assistant Political Agent of Jhalawad. Owing to his minority, the Wankaner State was placed under Agency management. He was educated at Rajkumar College, Rajkot, where he was placed under the care of Chester Macnaghten and C.W. Waddington. He won the Fergusson Gold Medal for English-speaking there. After completing his studies at the College, in 1898 he visited the principal cities of India and Ceylon (Sri Lanka). In the same year, he visited England along with F. de B. Hancock and spent four months there, followed by a visit to Paris, France, before finally returning to Wankaner on 22 October 1898.

== Reign ==
The long minority came to an end on 18 March 1899 when he was invested with the full powers of government at a Durbar by J.M. Hunter, the then Political Agent in Kathiawar. Soon after he took over, the Wankaner State experienced a severe famine in 1900. He handled it well by providing generous and careful relief efforts, which saved the bhayats and ryots from starving and losing everything. As insurance against the famine, he constructed two irrigation tanks: one at Vadsar, known as the Jaswantnagar Tank, named after his grandfather, and another at Mesariya, named Vinaysagar, after his father.

He was highly interested in education. He made primary education free and set up scholarships for students who, after completing high school, wished to pursue college studies in Arts, Engineering, or Medicine. He attended the Viceroy's Durbar at Rajkot in November 1900. He attended the Delhi Durbar in 1911, where he was personally made a Knight Commander of the Order of the Indian Empire by George V.

A well-educated and progressive ruler, he took an interest in improving the welfare of his subjects. He established the first Farmers' Co-operative Bank in Saurashtra to provide finance to farmers, promoted agriculture, as well as the dairy and textile industries. He also introduced village self-government schemes, the first pensions for state employees, reformed the public services and a strong and effective police force.

A gifted sportsmen, he excelled in badminton, cricket and marksmanship. He also took an interest in motoring, aircraft and architecture, building several palaces and public buildings in Wankaner and Wankaner House in Bombay. He celebrated his Golden Jubilee on 31 May 1931.

=== Great War ===
During the World War I, he placed the entire resources of his State at the disposal of the Government and saw active service. He with the Kathiawar Motor Ambulance Corps in Flanders. The temporary rank of Captain was conferred on him while at the front, and it was made permanent on 1 January 1918. On the same date, for his services during the war, he was granted a personal salute of 11 guns, which was made permanent in 1931.

=== Instrument of Accession ===
On 15 August 1947, Amarsinhji signed the Instrument of Accession, whereby the Wankaner State acceded to the Dominion of India. This accession was accepted by Lord Mountbatten, the then Governor-General of India, on 16 August 1947.

== Paddock ==
He managed a paddock in his state to breed high-quality country-bred and Kathiawari horses. Each year, the Government Army Remount Agents purchased horses from the paddock. In 1901, the Royal Commission on Horse-Breeding visited and praised the paddock's management and the quality of the horses.

== Shree Amarsinhji Mills Limited ==
In 1951, Shree Amarsinhji Mills Limited, a cotton textile mill named after him, was established by his son, Pratapsinhji Jhala, in Wankaner. In 1980, the mill was taken over by Kores India. His grandson, Digvijaysinh Jhala, served as its director from 1960.

== Death ==
He died on 28 June 1954, and his eldest son, Pratapsinhji Amarsinhji, succeeded him as the Maharana Raj Sahib of Wankaner.

== Honours ==
Country	Year	Honour	Grade	Class	Ribbon	Post-nominal letters
British India	1903	Delhi Durbar Medal (1903)		Gold		
British India	1911	Delhi Durbar Medal (1911)		Gold		
British India	1911	Order of the Indian Empire	Knight Commander			KCIE
United Kingdom	1918	1914–15 Star				
United Kingdom	1918	British War Medal				
United Kingdom	1918	Victory Medal 1914–19				
United Kingdom	1935	King George V Silver Jubilee Medal				
British India	1936	Order of the Star of India	Knight Commander			KCSI
United Kingdom	1937	King George VI Coronation Medal				
Dominion of India	1947	Indian Independence Medal				
