= Morvi State =

Princely state of India

Coordinates: 22.82°N 70.83°E

Morvi State મોરબી રિયાસત
- Princely State of British India
- 1698–1948
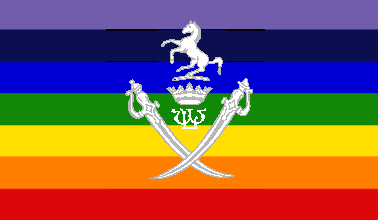
- Flag

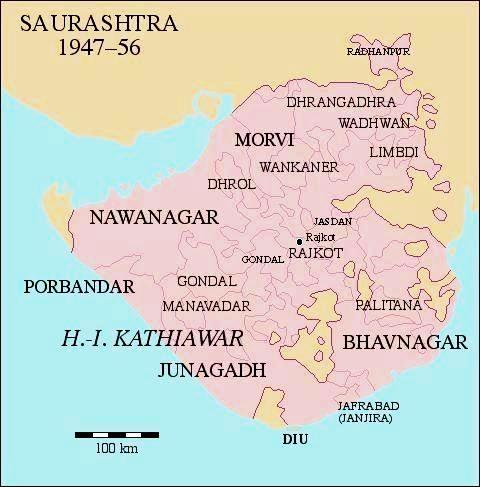
- Location of Morvi State in Saurashtra
- Capital: Morbi
- Area
  - 1931: 2,129 km^{2} (822 sq mi)
- Population
  - 1931: 42,602
- History
  - Established: 1698
  - Indian independence: 1948
Succeeded by
Dominion of India

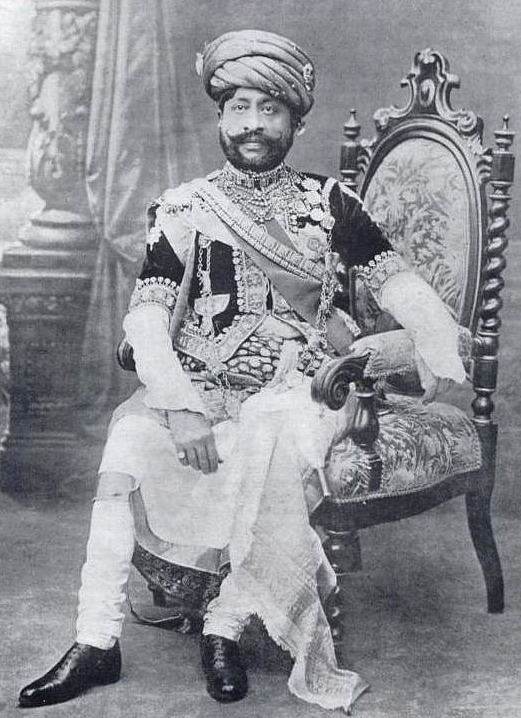
Picture of the Maharaja Thakur Sahib of Morvi Sir Waghji II Rawaji (1858–1922)

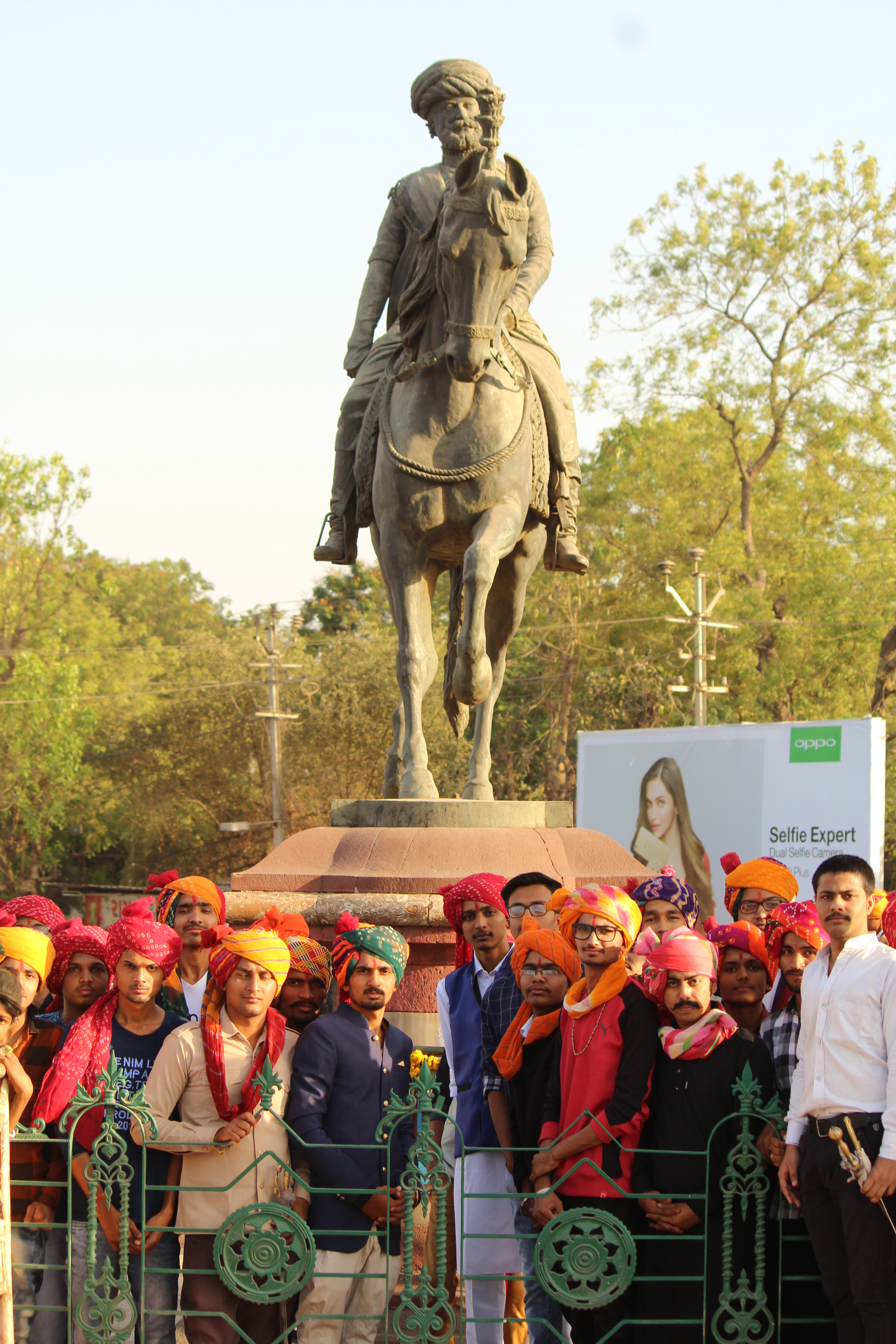
Equestrian statue of Sir Waghji

Morvi State, also spelled as Morvee State or Morbi State, was a princely salute state in the historical Halar prant (district) of Kathiawar during the British Raj.

The town of Morvi (Morbi), Gujarat, was its capital. The Kotwals of the royal palace of Morvi were Talpada Kolis of Radhavanaj village of Kheda district.

The rulers of the princely state belonged to the Jadeja rajput dynasty.

The state's last ruler signed the instrument of accession to the Dominion of India on 15 February 1948.

== History ==
Morbi was founded as a princely state around 1698 by Kanyoji when the heir apparent of Cutch State fled Bhuj with his mother after his father Ravaji was murdered and the throne was seized by his uncle Pragmalji I. It became a British protectorate in 1807. The state was in the colonial sway of the Kathiawar Agency of the Bombay Presidency.

In 1943, with the implementation of the 'attachment scheme', Morvi State enlarged its territory by an additional 310 km^{2} with about 12,500 inhabitants when the Hadala Taluk and the Kotda-Nayani Thana, as well as the small Malia princely state were merged.

On 15 August 1947, the state officially ceased to exist by merging into the west Indian United State of Saurashtra (initially - of Kathiawar), which later merged into Bombay state; since that was divided, it is in Gujarat.

== Rulers ==
The rulers of the state belonged to the Jadeja clan of Rajputs, and bore the title Thakur Sahib until the last added the higher title Maharaja in 1926.

=== Thakur Sahibs ===
- 1698 - 1733 Kanyoji Rawaji (of Kutch) (d. 1733)
- 1733 - 1739 Aliyaji Kanyoji (d. 1739)
- 1739 - 1764 Rawaji Aliyaji I (d. 1764)
- 1764 - 1772 Pachanji Rawaji (d. 1772)
- 1772 - 1783 Waghji I Rawaji (d. 1783)
- 1783 - 1790 Hamirji Waghji (d. 1790)
- 1790 - 1828 Jyaji Waghji (d. 1828)
- 1828 - 1846 Prithirajji Jyaji (d. 1846)
- 1846 - 17 February 1870 Rawaji II Prithirajji (b. 1828 - d. 1870)
- 17 February 1870 – 11 July 1922 Waghji II Rawaji also called Kathiyawadi American (b. 1858 - d. 1922) (personal style Maharaja from 16 February 1887) (from 30 June 1887, Sir Waghji II Rawaji)
- 17 Feb 1870 - 1 Jan 1879 Regents (Council of administration)
  - - Shambhuprasad Laxmilal
  - - Jhunjhabai Sakhidas (to 187.)
- 11 July 1922 – 3 June 1926 Lakhdhirji Waghji (see below) (b. 1876 - d. 1957)

=== Thakur Sahib Maharaja ===
- 3 June 1926 – 21 January 1948 Lakhdhirji Waghji (s.a.) (from 1 January 1930, Sir Lakhdirji Waghji)
- 21 January 1948 – 17 August 1957 Mahendrasinhji Lakhdhirji

== See also ==
- Political integration of India
- Western India States Agency

== External links and sources ==
- Media related to Morvi State at Wikimedia Commons
