= Wankaner Assembly constituency =

Legislative Assembly constituency in Gujarat State, India

Coordinates: 22.62°N 70.95°E

Wankaner
- Constituency No. 67 for the Gujarat Legislative Assembly

Constituency details
- Country: India
- Region: Western India
- State: Gujarat
- District: Morbi
- Lok Sabha constituency: Rajkot
- Established: 1972
- Total electors: 281,487
- Reservation: None

Member of Legislative Assembly
- 15th Gujarat Legislative Assembly
- Incumbent Jitendra Kantilal Somani
- Party: Bharatiya Janata Party
- Elected year: 2022

Wankaner is one of the 182 Legislative Assembly constituencies of Gujarat state in India. It is part of Morbi district and a segment of Rajkot Lok Sabha constituency.

== List of segments ==
This assembly seat represents the following segments

1. Wankaner Taluka
2. Rajkot Taluka (Part) Villages – Jaliya, Ratanpar, Khorana, Sanosara, Rampara (Suliya), Vankvad, Hirasar, Satda, Jhiyana, Khijadiya, Nagalpar, Rajgadh, Gavaridad, Para Pipaliya, Hadmatiya (Bedi), Nakaravadi, Pipaliya, Ranpar, Kuchiyadad, Rampara Beti, Parevala, Saypar, Kuvadva, Dhamalpar, Sokhada, Ronki, Ghanteshvar, Vajdi Gadh, Vejagam, Maliyasan, Targhadiya, Gunda, Magharvada, Mesvada, Barvan, Chanchadiya, Jamgadh, Rafala, Kherdi, Amargadh, Thorala, Mahika, Thebachda, Gadhka, Bedla, Fadadang, Deroi, Manharpur, Bedi, Madhapar, Anandpar

== Members of Legislative Assembly ==
Year	Member	Picture	Party
1972	Abdulmutallib K Pirzada		Indian National Congress
2007	Mohammed Javed Pirzada		Indian National Congress
2012	Mohammed Javed Pirzada		Indian National Congress
2017	Mohammed Javed Pirzada		Indian National Congress
2022	Jitendra Kantilal Somani		Bharatiya Janata Party

== Election results ==
=== 2022 ===
Gujarat Assembly Election, 2022
Party	Candidate	Votes	%	±%
BJP	Jitendra Kantilal Somani	80,677	39.75	+0.88
INC	Mohammed Javed Pirzada	60,722	29.92	−9.7
AAP	Vikram Sorani	53,485	26.35	New
Majority		19,955	9.83	
Turnout		2,02,972		
Registered electors		276,746		
BJP gain from INC		Swing		

=== 2017 ===
Gujarat Legislative Assembly Election, 2017: Wankaner
Party	Candidate	Votes	%	±%
INC	Mohammed Javed Pirzada	72,588	39.62	+0.88
BJP	Jitu Somani	71,227	38.87	+3.6
Independent	Gordhanbhai Saravaiya	25,547	13.94	
Majority		1,361	0.85	−2.63
Turnout		1,83,226	74.89	+0.41
Registered electors		244,664		
INC hold		Swing		

=== 2012 ===
Gujarat Assembly Election, 2012
Party	Candidate	Votes	%	±%
INC	Mohammed Javed Pirzada	59,038	38.74	
BJP	Jitu Somani	53,737	35.27	
Majority		7,448	3.48	
Turnout		1,52,380	74.48	
INC hold		Swing		

=== 1972 ===
- Abdulmutallib K Pirzada (Congress) : 19,614 votes
- Keshubhai Patel (BJS) : 10,047

== See also ==
- List of constituencies of the Gujarat Legislative Assembly
- Morbi district
