= Mohammed Javed Pirzada =

Indian politician

Mohammed Javed Pirzada is an Indian politician belonging to the Indian National Congress. He is a three-time MLA representing Wankaner constituency in Gujarat, having won in 2007, 2012 and 2017. Prior to joining politics, Pirzada was a school principal. He lost his first election contest in 2002. He has obtained BA and B. Ed. degrees from the Saurashtra University. In 2018, Pirzada was appointed a member of the Gujarat State Waqf Board, a body responsible for properties donated for religious or charitable purposes as recognized by Muslim Law.

Pirzada comes from a prominent local family. His father Abdul Pirzada and two brothers Manzoor Pirzada and Khurshid Pirzada have also served as representatives from Wankaner in the Gujarat Vidhan Sabha.
