= Odhava =

Village in Gujarat state, India

Coordinates: 23.885°N 72.048°E

Odhava is a small village located in Patan Taluka in Northern district of Patan, Gujarat, India.
