= Khanpar =

- village
- Location in Gujarat, India Khanpar (India)
- Coordinates: 22.747585°N 70.640588°E
- Country: India
- State: Gujarat
- District: Morbi

Languages
  - Official: Gujarati, Hindi
- Time zone: UTC+5:30 (IST)
- PIN: 363641
- Vehicle registration: GJ
- Website: gujaratindia.com

Khanpar is a village located in the Morbi district in the Indian state of Gujarat. The elevation of Khanpar is 49 metres (161 ft) above sea level.
