= Kores (company) =

Austrian company and brand of school stationery and office products

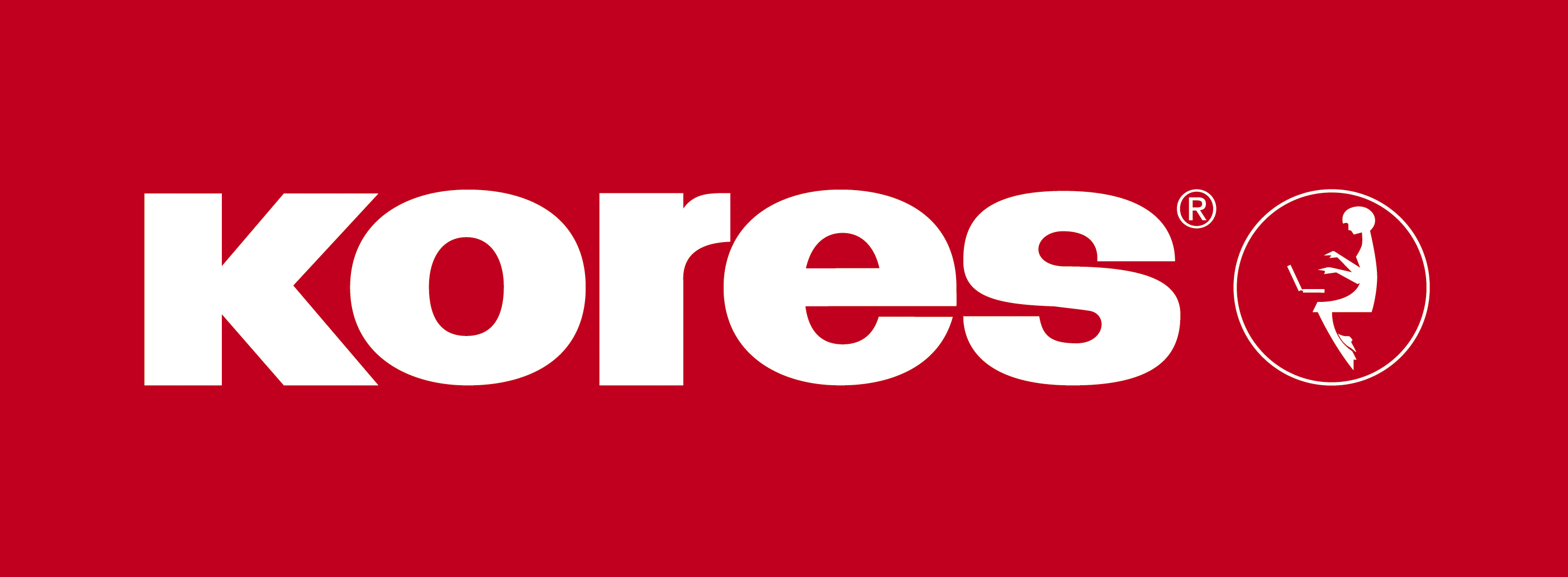
- Industry: Stationery
- Founded: 1887; 139 years ago
- Founder: Wilhelm Koreska
- Headquarters: Vienna, Austria
- Products: Adhesives, Pencil Carbon Papers, Correction fluid, Correction tapes, Writing instruments, Markers, Notes, Colouring pencils
- Website: kores.com

Kores is a brand of school stationery and office products best known for solid glue sticks, dry correction tapes and Kolores coloured pencils. Kores was founded in 1887 by Wilhelm Koreska, the great-grandfather of Clemens Koreska, the current president of Kores Group. The worldwide HQ of Kores is based in Vienna, Austria and its main offices are in Czech Republic (Prague), Germany (Rommerskirchen), Mexico (Mexico City), Colombia (Bogotá) and Venezuela (Caracas). Kores has two key production facilities in Mexico City and Czech Republic (Strmilov).

== History ==
In the first part of 20th century, Kores produced chemical office products such as carbon paper, in countries as far and wide as China and Egypt. Kores had its own company magazine, Kores Revue, and an official sales handbook on how to sell carbon paper, which are displayed at the Kores museum display at the Vienna HQ. Following a decline in carbon paper sales due to changing office technology, Kores began focusing on the production of glue sticks and correction products from the 1990s, expanding into the new markets of Eastern Europe, as well as supplying businesses in Western Europe and the United States.

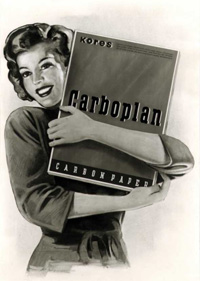
Kores Carbon Paper

In the 2000s, under the leadership of Peter Koreska, Kores International Product Management began selling products such as Scooter and 2Way correction tapes, Neon coloured glue sticks, Bright Liner highlighters and Desk Pot and Design Line adhesive tape dispensers. Kores also introduced coloured index notes for bookmarking and referencing. In 2009, the Kolores range of coloring pencils were launched worldwide as Kores expanded into school products. Following the success of Kolores, Kores launched wax crayons, felt tip pens, pencils and sharpeners.

== 2010 - today ==
By 2010, Peter and Robert Koreska had purchased back the Kores trademark rights for the key markets of Germany, France, Italy, United Kingdom, Netherlands and Scandinavia. In the same year, Kores Germany launched a program of printer consumables, including laser toners, ink jet cartridges and typewriter ribbons.

== Gallery ==
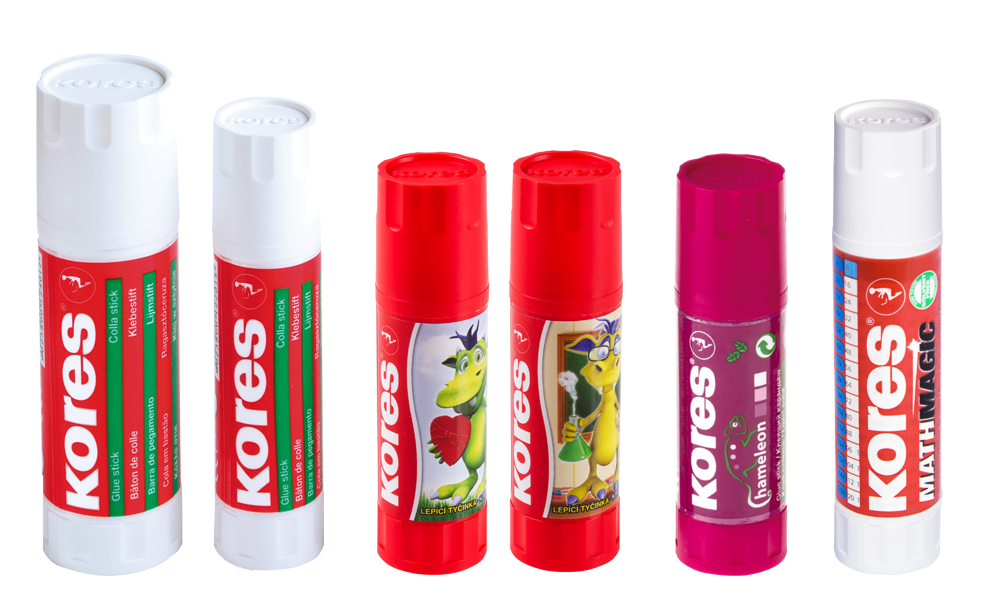
Kores Glue Sticks

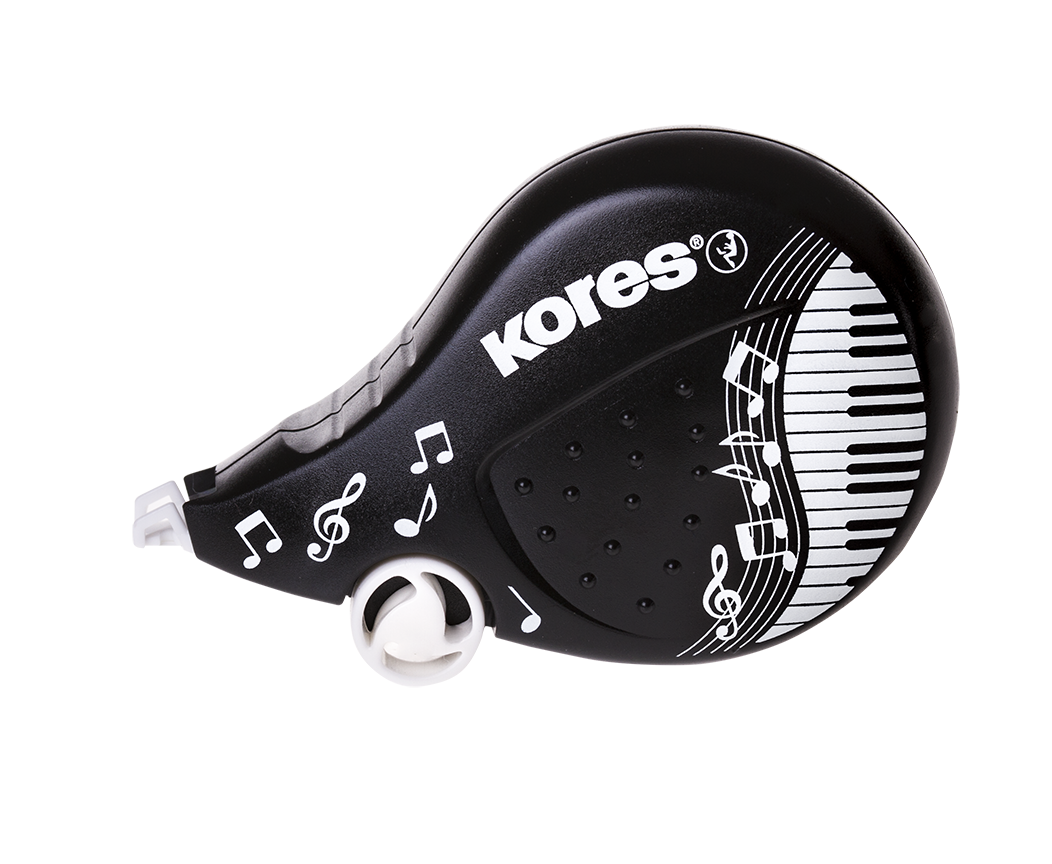
Kores Scooter Black

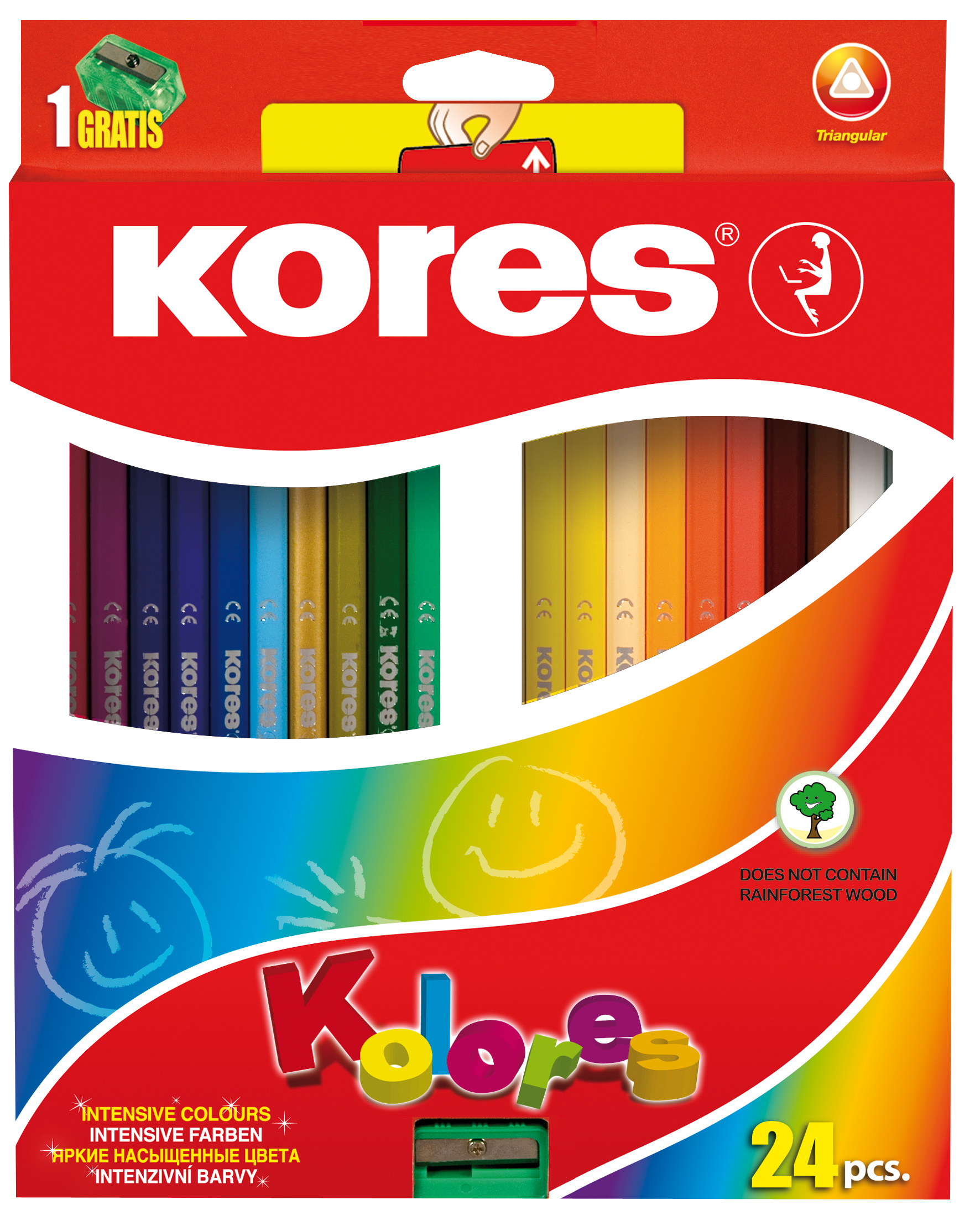
Kores Kolores colouring pencils

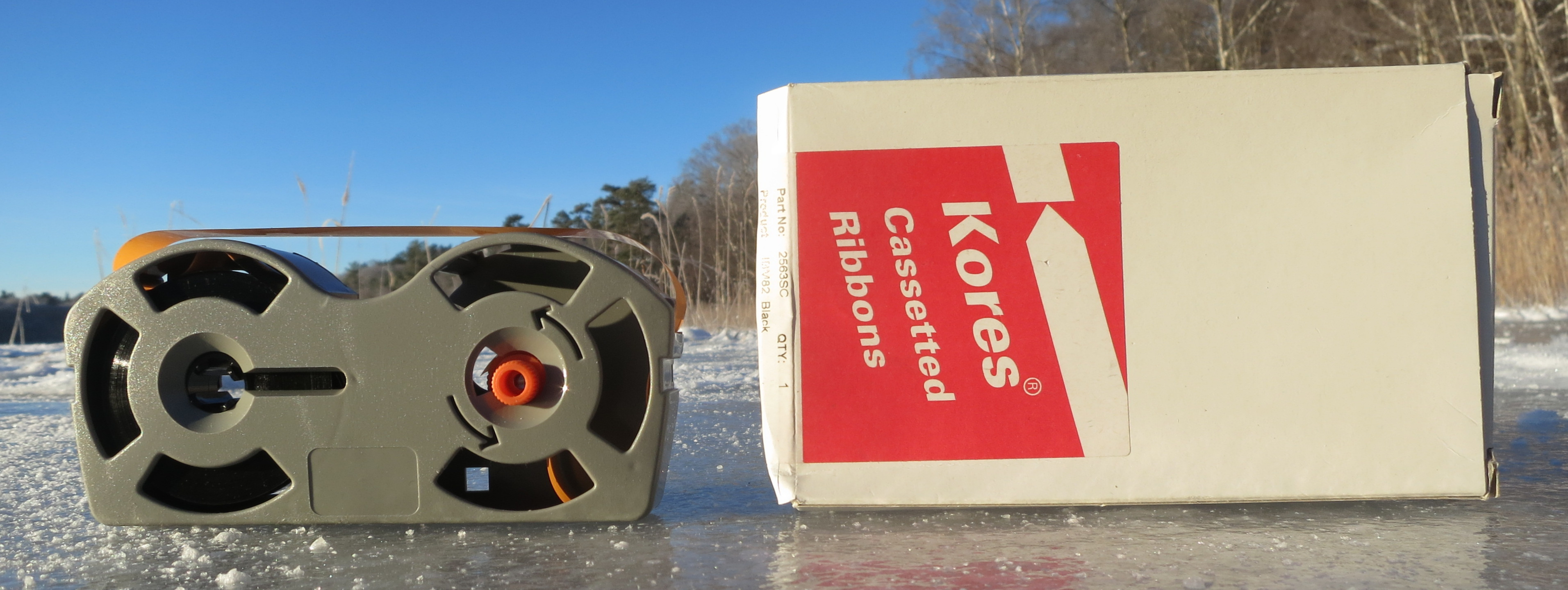
Kores 1990s cassetted ink ribbon for electric typewriters
