= Machchhu River =

Coordinates: 23°09′N 70°46′E

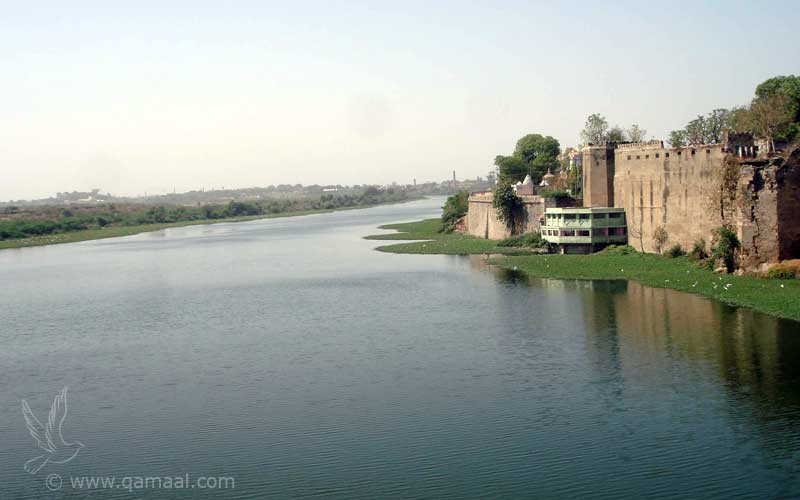

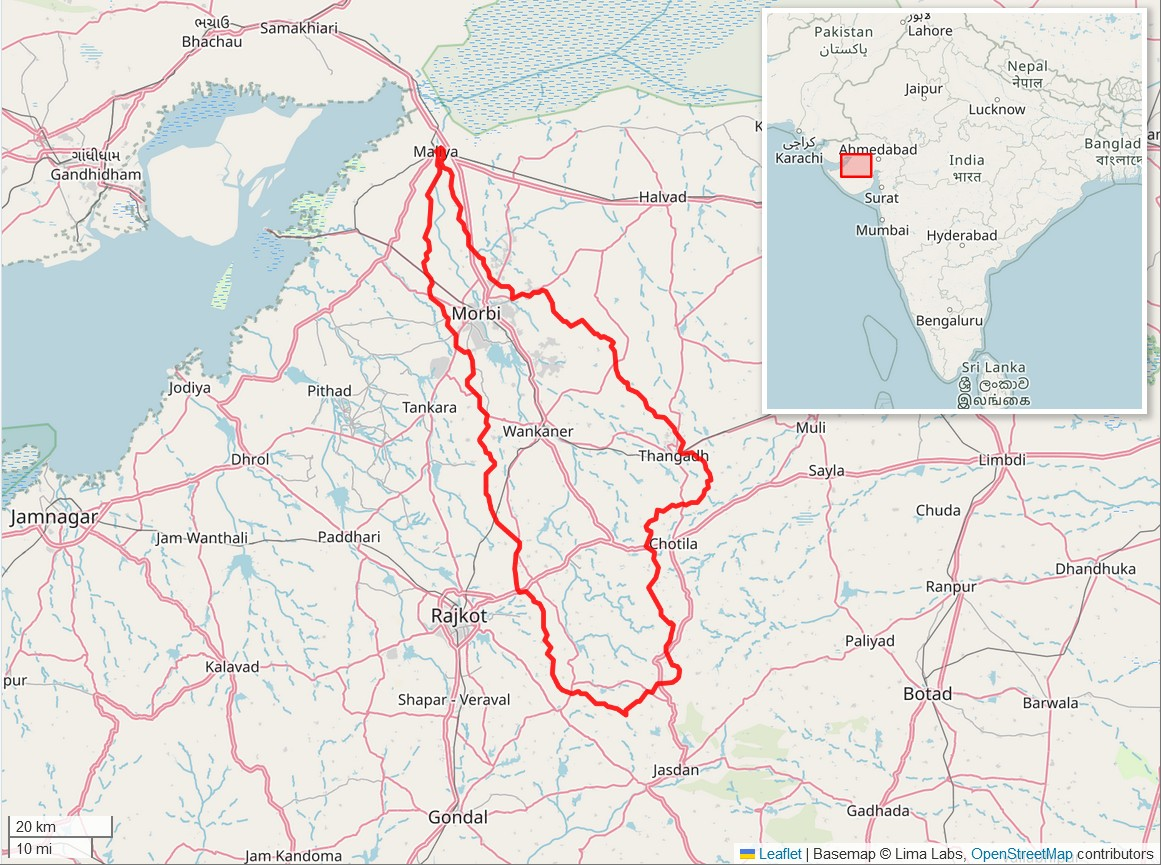
- Machchhu River watershed (Interactive map)

Location
- Country: India
- State: Gujarat
- Districts: Surendranagar, Rajkot, Morbi
- Taluk: Wankaner (Morbi), Morbi (Morbi), Maliya (Morbi)

Physical characteristics
- Source
  - location: Mandav hills chotila
- Mouth
  - location: in the Ran of kutchh near Maliya
- Length: 130 km (81 mi)
- Basin size: 2,515 km^{2} (971 sq mi; 621,000 acres)

Basin features
- Tributaries
  - left: Beti, Asoi
  - right: Jamburi, Benia, Machchhori, Maha

Machchhu River (Gujarati: મચ્છુ નદી, romanized: Machchhu nadi) is a river in Gujarat, India, with its origin in the Madla hills. Its basin has a maximum length of 130 km (81 mi). The total catchment area of the basin is 2,515 km^{2} (971 sq mi). The river is also occasionally transliterated as Machhu River.

== 1979 dam failure ==
On 11 August 1979, the Machchhu-2 dam, situated on the river, failed, sending a wall of water through the city of Morbi. Estimates of the number of people killed vary greatly, ranging from 1,800 to 25,000.

== 2022 suspension bridge collapse ==
On 30 October 2022, a suspension bridge in the city of Morbi that crossed the river collapsed. Hundreds of people were on the bridge at the time and at least 141 people died. The accident occurred just four days after the bridge was reopened following repairs.

== In popular culture ==
In 1984, a Gujarati film named Machchu Tara Vaheta Pani starring Upendra Trivedi, Arvind Trivedi, Chandrakant Pandya, Narayan Rajgor, Minal Patel, and Kamini Bhatia was released which was directed by Vibhakar Mehta.

== See also ==
- 1979 Machchhu dam failure
