= Morbi district =

- District of Gujarat
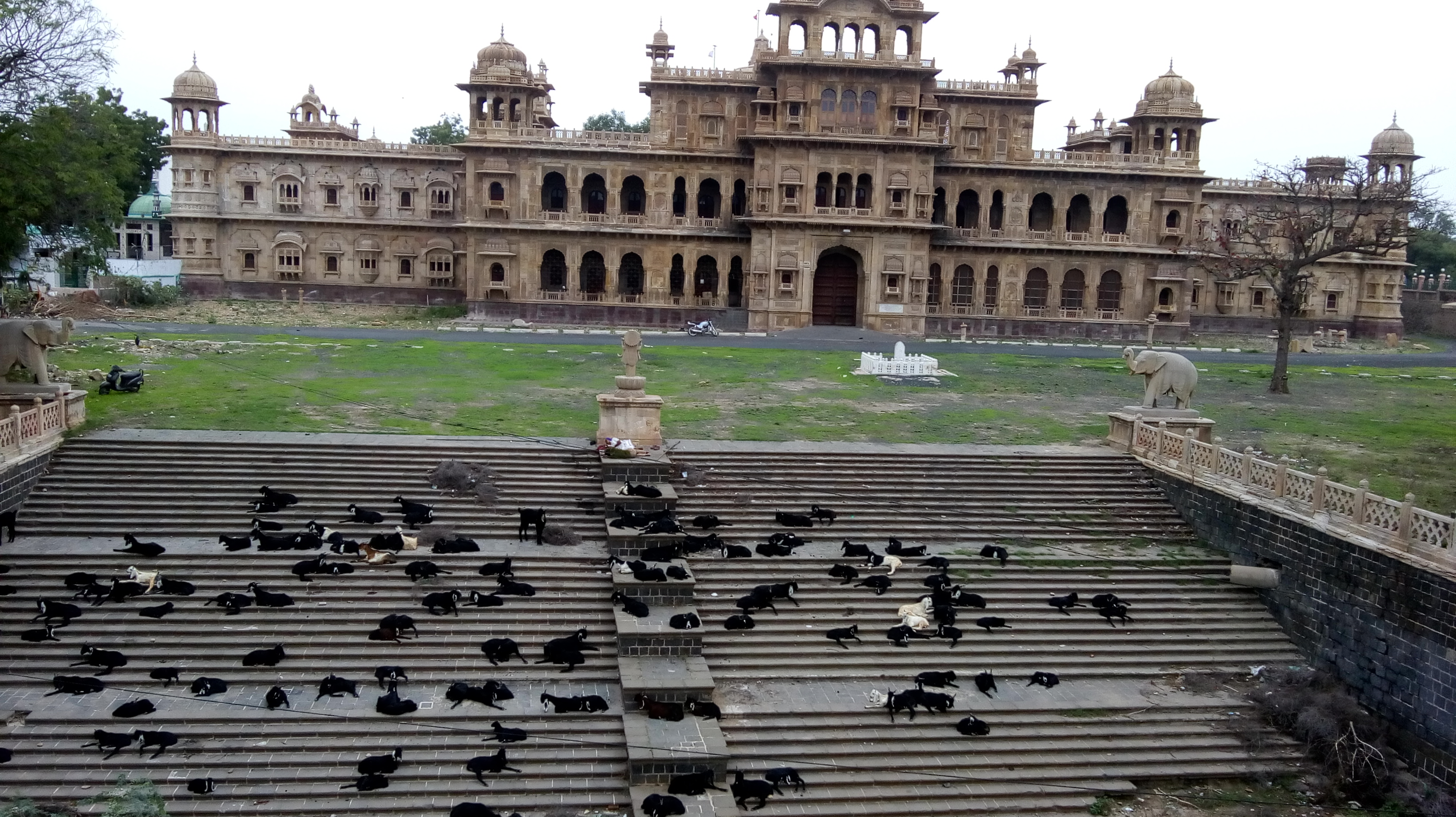
- Mani Mandir in Morbi
- Interactive map outlining Morbi District
- Location in Gujarat
- Coordinates: 22°49′28″N 70°56′12″E
- Country: India
- State: Gujarat
- Region: Saurashtra
- Established: 15 August 2013
- Headquarters: Morbi

Area
  - Total: 4,872 km^{2} (1,881 sq mi)

Population (2011)
  - Total: 960,329
  - Density: 197.1/km^{2} (510.5/sq mi)

Languages
  - Official: Gujarati, Hindi
- Time zone: UTC+5:30 (IST)
- Vehicle registration: GJ-36
- Website: morbi.nic.in

Morbi district is in the state of Gujarat, India. It was formed on 15 August 2013, along with several other districts, on the 67th Independence Day of India. Morbi city is the administrative headquarters of the district. The district has five talukas - Morbi, Maliya, Tankara, Wankaner (previously in Rajkot district) and Halvad (previously in Surendranagar district). Morbi city is the administrative headquarters of Morbi district. The town of Morbi is situated on the Machchhu River, 35 km from the sea and 60 km from Rajkot. As per 2011 census data, the city had a population of 2,10,451 and average literacy rate of 83.64%.

This district is surrounded by Kutch district to the north, Surendranagar district to the east, Rajkot district to the south and Jamnagar district to the west.

== Etymology ==
The district is named after Morbi city. The name of the city of Morbi (literally meaning the city of peacocks) was probably derived from the king of Bhuj.

The district was formed from four talukas formerly in Rajkot district (Morbi, Maliya, Tankara, Wankaner) and Halvad taluka, formerly in Surendranagar district.

== Demographics ==
Morbi district has an approximate population of 9,60,329, of which 358,420 (37.32%) lived in urban areas. Morbi district has an area of approx. 4,871.5 km^{2}. and a density of 207 persons/sq km. The district had a sex ratio of 941 females per 1000 males. Scheduled Castes and Scheduled Tribes are 65,698 (6.84%) and 5,159 (0.54%) of the population respectively.

Religions in Morbi district (2011)
| Religion | Percent |
| Hinduism | 84.24% |
| Islam | 14.99% |
| Jains | 0.58% |
| Other or not stated | 0.19% |

808,967 (84.24%) were Hindus, 143,925 (14.99%) were Muslims and 5,607 (0.58%) Jains.

Languages of Morbi district (2011)
1. Gujarati (97.3%)
2. Hindi (0.96%)
3. Marathi (0.90%)
4. Others (0.86%)

At the time of the 2011 census, 97.28% of the population spoke Gujarati, 0.96% Hindi and 0.90% Marathi as their first language.

== Taluks ==
Morbi district consists of the following five talukas.

Taluks of Morbi District
| Taluk | Number of villages | No. of gram panchayats |
|---|---|---|
| Morbi Taluk | 94 | 94 |
| Tankara Taluk | 43 | 42 |
| Halvad Taluk | 67 | 67 |
| Wankaner Taluk | 102 | 101 |
| Malia (Miana) Taluk | 44 | 44 |

== Politics ==
| District | No. | Constituency | Name | Party | Remarks |
|---|---|---|---|---|---|
| Morbi | 65 | Morbi | Kantilal Amrutiya | | |
| Morbi | 66 | Tankara | Durlabhji Dethariya | | |
| Morbi | 67 | Wankaner | Jitendra Somani | | |

== Transport ==
Morbi district is connected by a national highway. It has two railway junctions, Wankaner and Maliya-Miyana. Morbi railway station lies on the track connecting these two junctions.
