= Wankaner State =

Former monarchy in India

Coordinates: 22.62°N 70.93°E

- 1620–1947
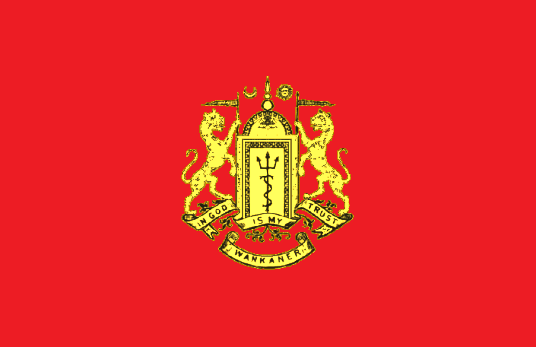
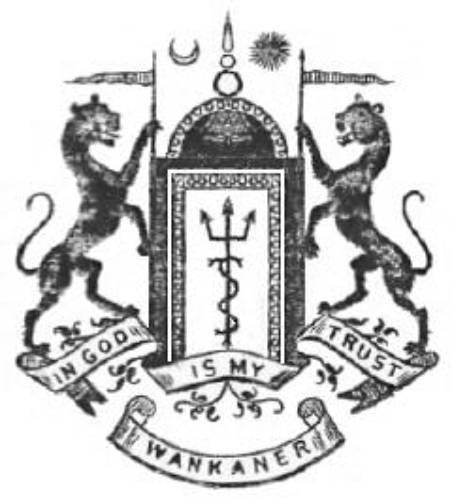
- Flag Coat of arms
- Motto: "In God is my Trust"
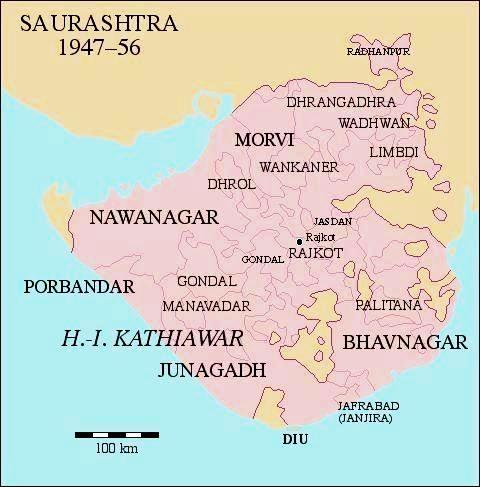
- Location of Wankaner State in Saurashtra
- Capital: Wankaner
- Maharana Saheb
  - 1620–1623: Sartanji
  - 1871–1954: Amarsinhji Banesinhji
- History
  - Established: 1620
  - British suzerainty ended: 1947

Area
- 1931: 1,075 km^{2} (415 sq mi)

Population
  - 1931: 44,259
Preceded by	Succeeded by
Kingdom of Jhalavad	India
- Today part of: Gujarat, India

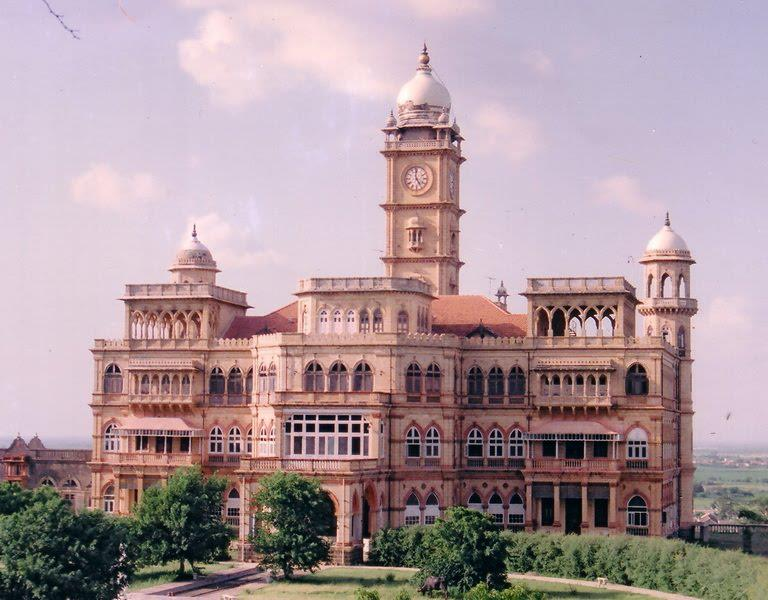
Wankaner Palace, built by Maharaja Amarsinhji in the 20th century

Wankaner State was one of the princely states of India in the historical Halar region of Kathiawar during the period of the British Raj. It was an 11-gun salute state belonging to the Kathiawar Agency of the Bombay Presidency. Its capital was in Wankaner, located in Rajkot district, Gujarat state. Most of the territory of the state was mountainous.

== History ==
Wankaner State was founded in 1620 by Raj Sartanji, son of Prathirajji, eldest son of Raj Chandrasinghji of Halvad (1584–1628). Sartanji with the help of Jam Lakhoji of Nawanagar defeated Mahiyas and Babarias and established himself at Wankaner with the title of Maharana.

In 1807 Wankaner State became a British protectorate when Maharana Raj Sahib Chandrasinhji II Kesarisinhji signed a treaty with the British. In 1862 the ruler of the state received a sanad giving the monarch authorization to adopt an heir. The ruler acceded to the Indian Union on 15 February 1948.

== See also ==
- List of Rajput dynasties
- Political integration of India
