= Morbi =

Morbi Morvi
- City
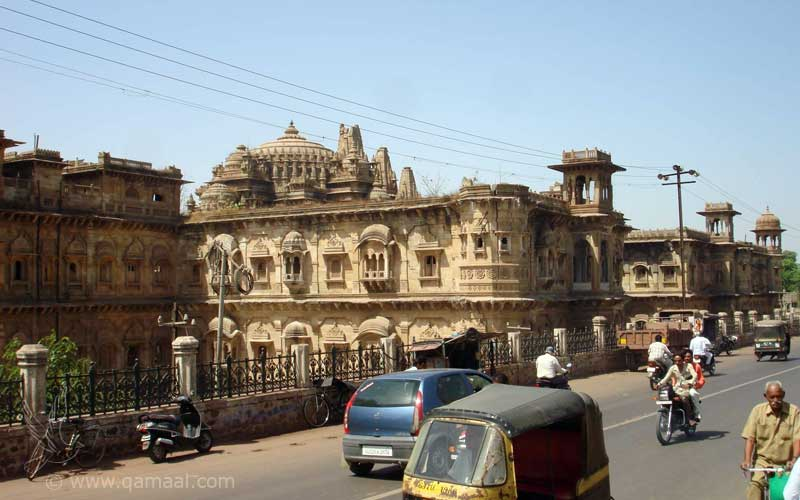
- Mani Mandir
- Nickname: Ceramics Capital of India
- Location in Gujarat, India Morbi (India)
- Coordinates: 22.82°N 70.83°E
- Country: India
- State: Gujarat
- District: Morbi

Government
  - Type: Municipal corporation
  - Body: Morbi Municipal Corporation
  - Mayor: Vacant

Area
  - Total: 137.21 km^{2} (52.98 sq mi)

Population (2025)
  - Total: 552,801
  - Density: 4,028.9/km^{2} (10,435/sq mi)

Languages
  - Official: Gujarati, Hindi
- Time zone: UTC+5:30 (IST)
- PIN: 363641/42
- Area code: 363641
- Vehicle registration: GJ-36
- Website: https://mmcgujarat.in/

Morbi or Morvi is a city founded as a princely state around 1698 by Jadeja Thakor Saheb Shree Kayoji Ravaji. It is in the Morbi district in the state of Gujarat, India. It is situated on the Kathiawar peninsula. The city is on the Machhu River, 35 km (22 mi) from the sea and 60 km (37 mi) from Rajkot. It is the former capital of Morvi State, which ceased to exist in 1948.

In 2011, the city's population was 194,947.

Morbi is known as the "ceramics capital of India".

== Etymology ==
The district is named after Morbi city. The name of the city of Morbi (literally meaning the city of peacocks) was probably derived from the king of Bhuj.

== Formation of municipal corporation ==
In January 2025, Morbi was upgraded from a municipality to a municipal corporation by the Gujarat state government. This change aimed to strengthen local governance, streamline administrative processes, and improve urban infrastructure. The creation of the Morbi Municipal Corporation is anticipated to provide enhanced public services, better urban planning, and a more responsive governance system for the growing population. This development marks a significant milestone in the urbanization and economic growth of the region.

== See also ==
- 2022 Morbi bridge collapse
