= Wankaner =

Town in Gujarat, India

- Town
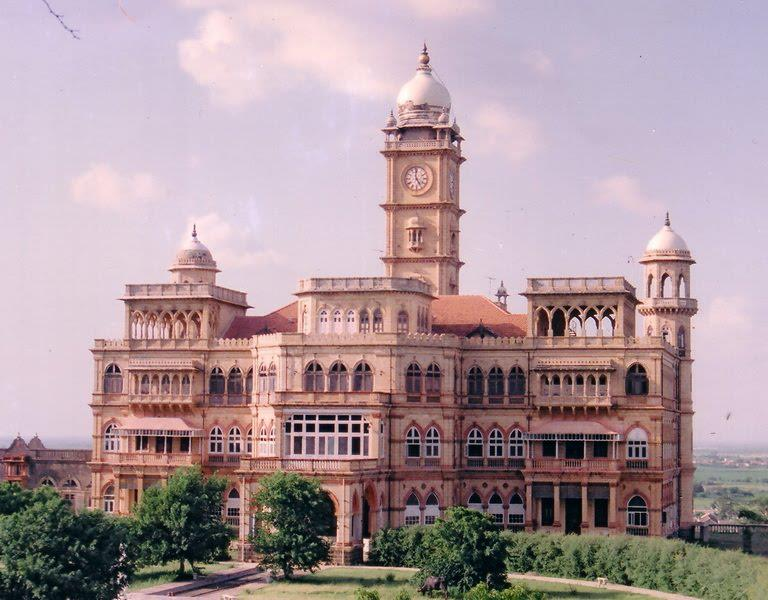
- Wankaner palace

- Location in Gujarat, India Wankaner (India)
- Coordinates: 22°36′58″N 70°57′11″E
- Country: India
- State: Gujarat
- District: Morbi
- Elevation: 81 m (266 ft)

Population (2011)
  - Total: 43,881

Languages
  - Official: Gujarati, Hindi
- Time zone: UTC+5:30 (IST)
- Vehicle registration: GJ

Wankaner is a town and a municipality in Morbi district in the State of Gujarat. Until 2013, Wankaner was part of the Rajkot district.

== Etymology ==
The city was named after its location on the Machhu River, "Wankaner" translating to "riverbend" ("Wanka" - bend, "ner" - river) in Gujarati.

== Geography ==
Wankaner is located at 22°36′58″N 70°57′11″E. It has an average elevation of 81 metres (265 feet) and is about 53 kilometres (33 mi) from Rajkot.

== History ==
Wankaner was legendarily founded and established by Shrimant Raj SartanJi Jhala. Wankaner has many other Hindu and Muslim places of worship.

Wankaner State was an 11-gun salute state during the British Raj era, when it was governed by members of the senior branch of the Jhala rajput dynasty.
