= List of palaces in India =

This is a list of palaces in India.

== Andhra Pradesh ==
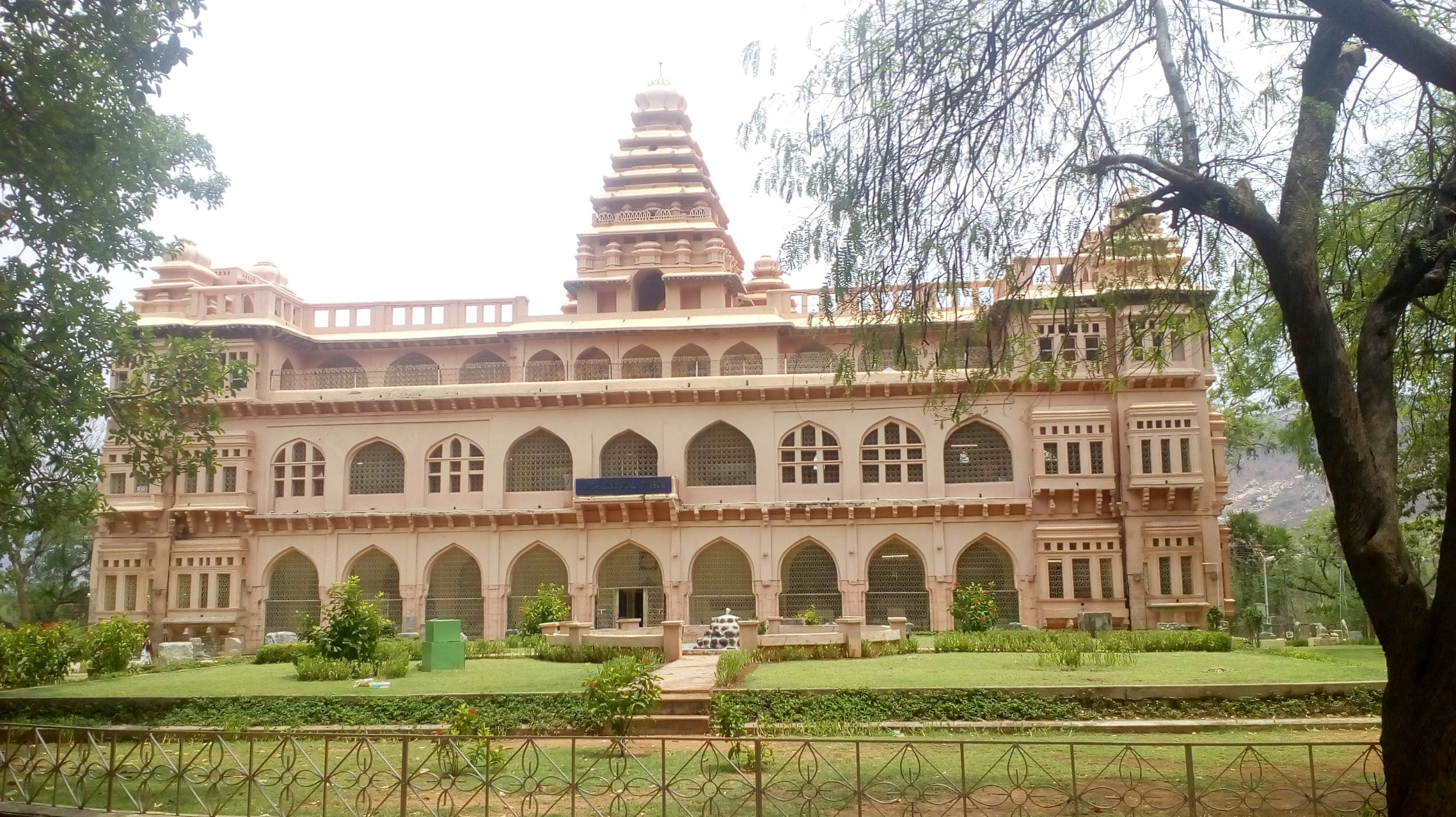
Raj Mahal, Chandragiri

- Raj Mahal, the former residence of the Vijayanagara Emperors - Tirupati
- Punganur Palace - Chittoor
- Hawa Mahal, Visakhapatnam - Visakhapatnam
- Gagan Mahal - Penukonda, Sri Sathya Sai
- Kuppam Palace - Chitoor
- Palaces in Vizianagaram Fort - Vizianagaram
- Tanisha Mahal, Kondapalli Fort - NTR
- Rangin Mahal, Gurramkonda Fort - Annamayya
- Karvetinagaram Palace - Chitoor
- Nawab's Palace, Arundati fort - Banaganapalle , Nandyal

== Assam ==
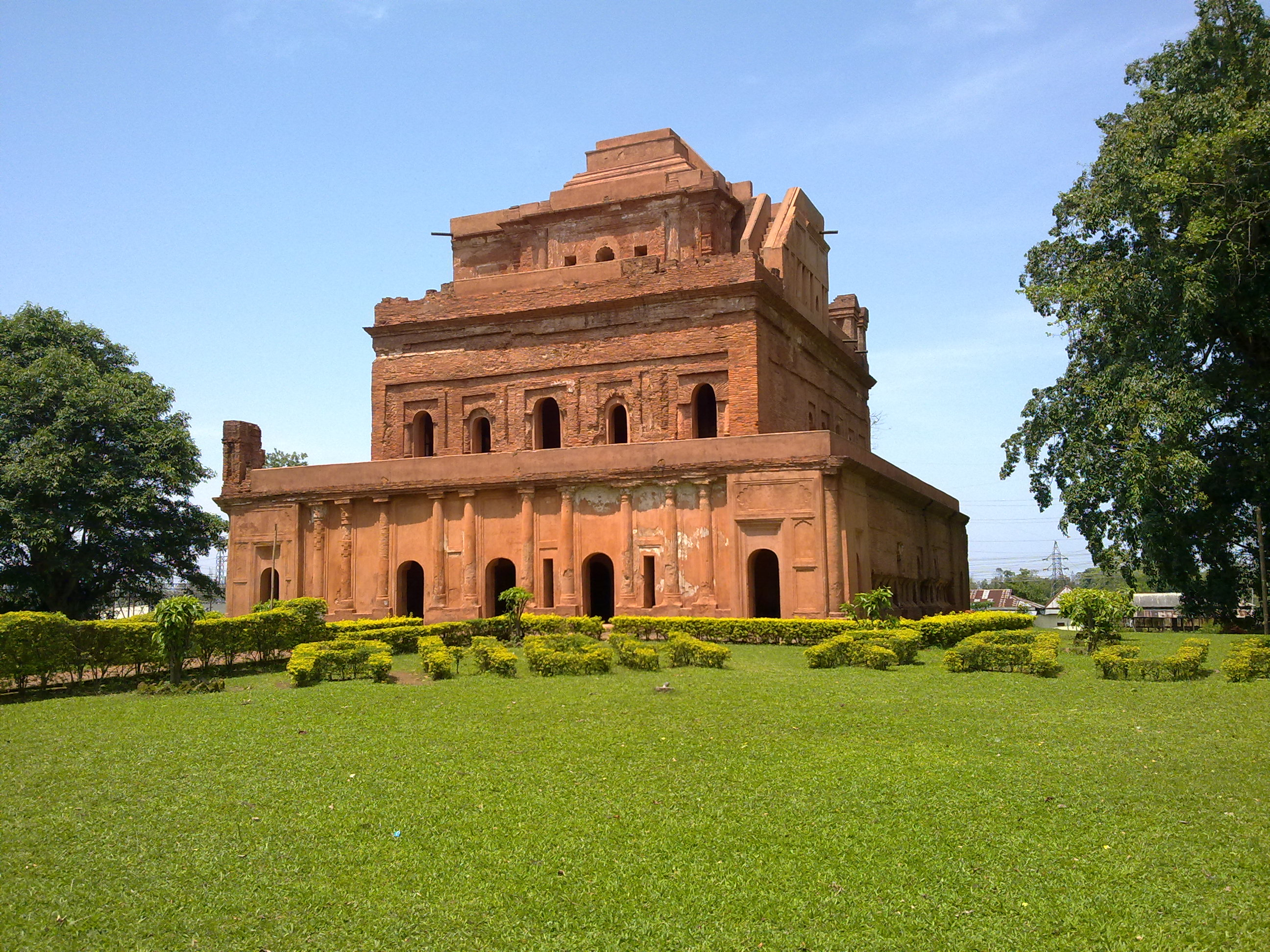
Kareng Ghar

- Kareng Ghar - Former residence of Ahom royals, Sivasagar
- Talatal Ghar - Former residence of Ahom royals, Sivasagar
- Matiabag Palace - Dhubri
- Rajbari, Abhayapuri - Bongaigaon

== Bihar ==
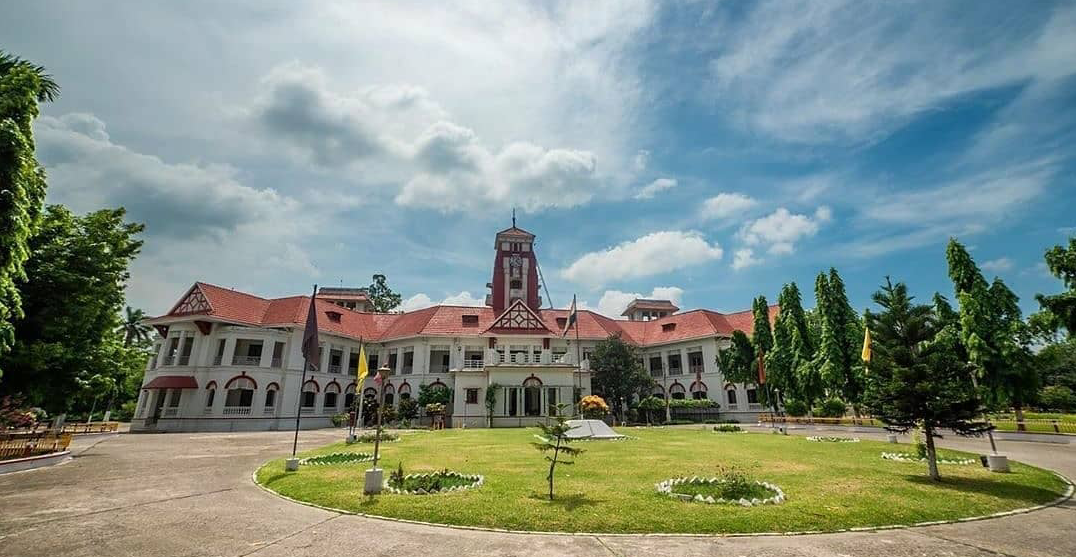
Bela Palace

- Anand Bag Palace, former seat of the Maharaja of Darbhanga - Darbhanga
- Krishnagarh Palace - Purnia
- Nagholkothi - Patna
- Nargona Palace, Darbhanga
- Navlakha Palace - Rajnagar, Madhubani
- Tekari Raj Palace - Tekari, Gaya
- Hathwa Raj Palace - Hathua, Gopalganj
- Bettiah Raj Palace - Bettiah, West Champaran
- Narhan Palace - Narhan, Samastipur
- Navratan palace - Purnia
- Krishnagarh palace - Sultanganj, Bhagalpur
- Bela Palace - Darbhanga
- Gidhaur palace - Jamui
- Naldanga Palace - Jamui
- Lalkothi palace - Jamui
- Sonbarsa Raj Mahal - Bhojpur

== Chhattisgarh ==
- Kanker Palace - Kanker
- Surguja Palace (Raghunath Palace) - Surguja
- Girivilas Palace - Sarangarh-Bilaigarh
- Koriya palace - Koriya

== Delhi ==
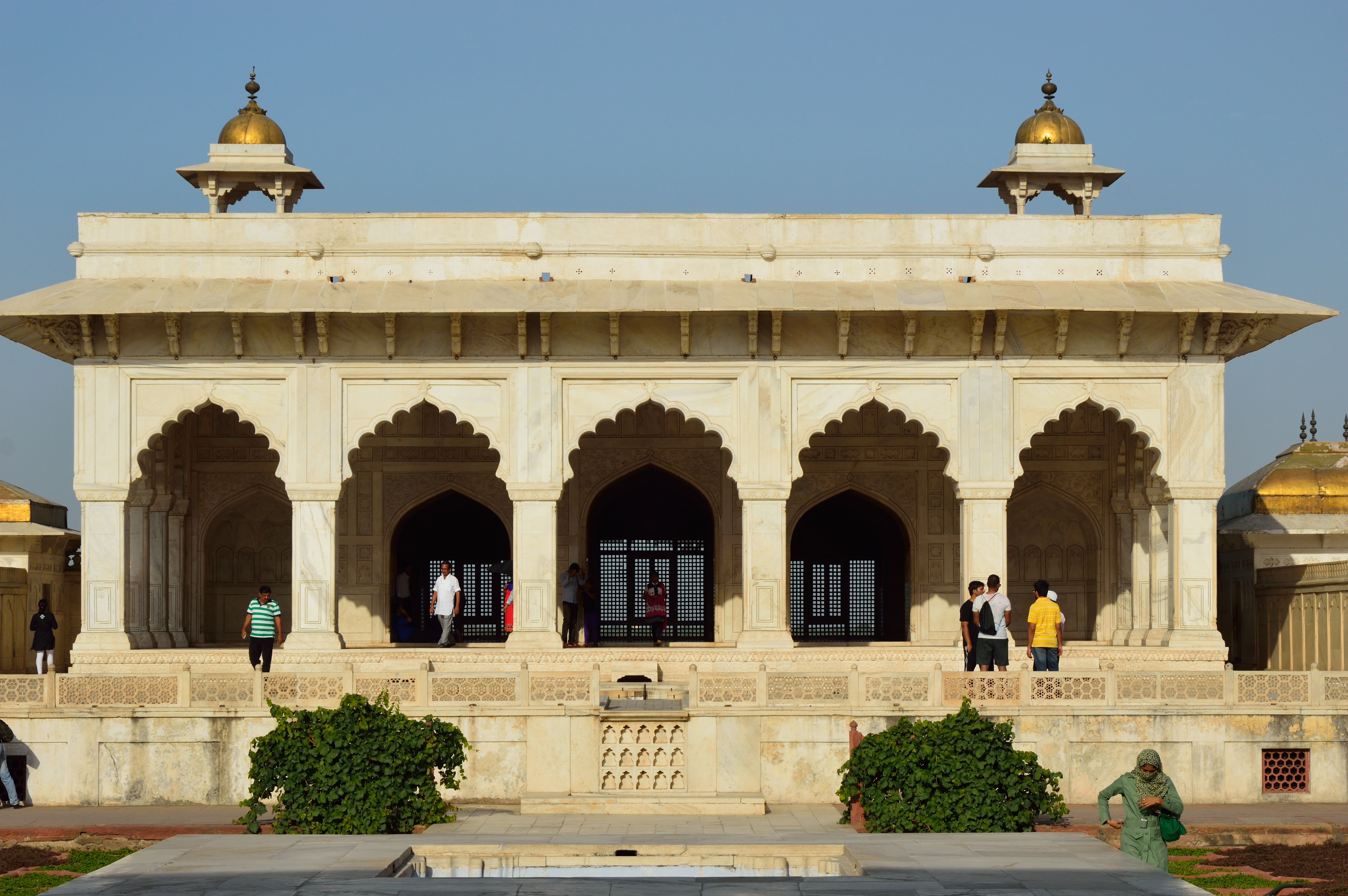
Khas Mahal, Red fort

- Rashtrapati Bhavan - Seat of the President, former viceregal residence, New Delhi
- Palaces in Red Fort - Central Delhi
- Bijai-Mandal, Tughlaqabad Fort - South East Delhi
- Jahaz Mahal - South Delhi
- Qudsia Bagh - Central Delhi
- Zafar Mahal - South Delhi

== Goa ==
- Deshprabhu Palace - Pernem
- Maquinez Palace - Campal, Panaji
- Adil Shah Palace (Old Secretariat) - Panaji

== Gujarat ==
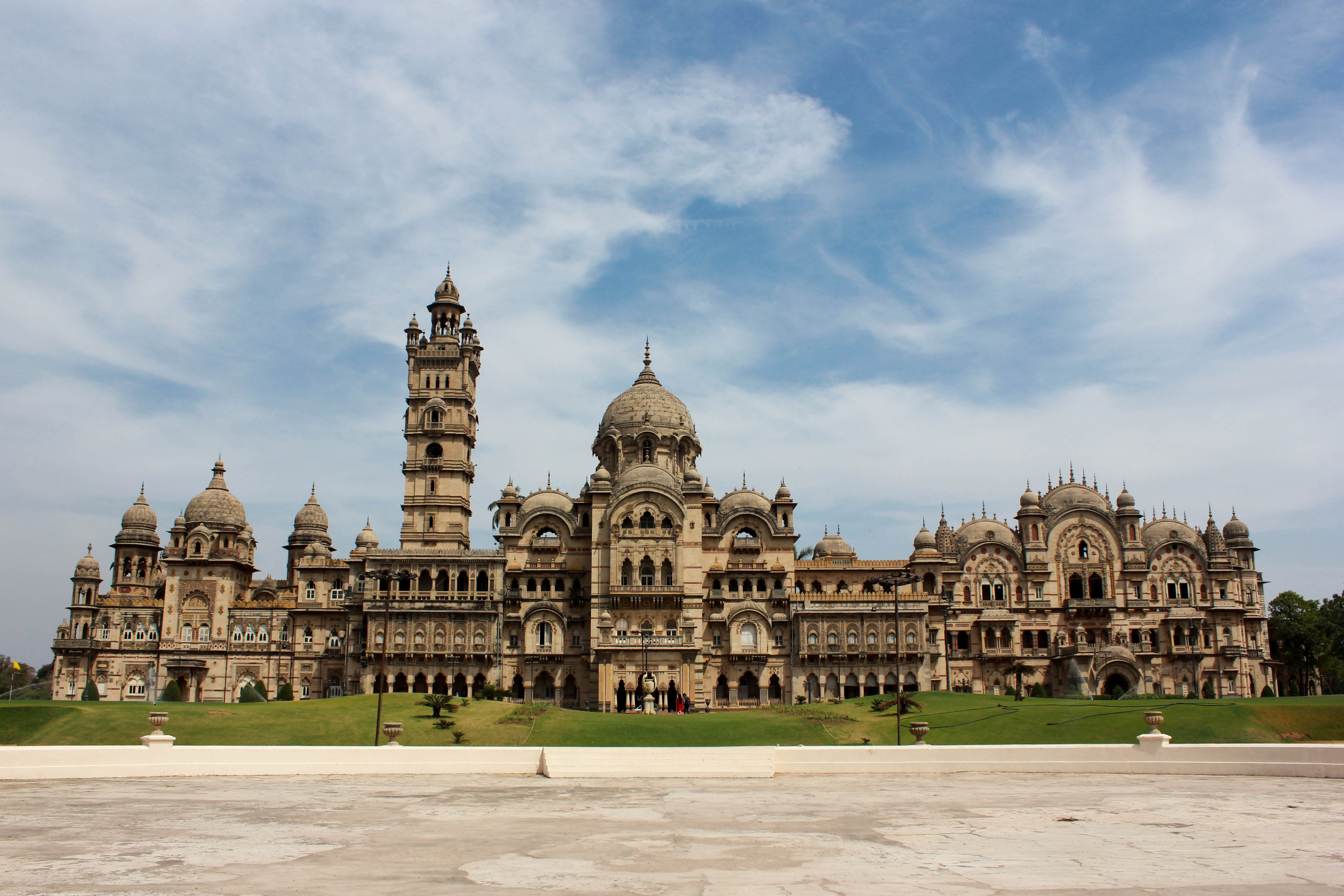
The Lakshmi Vilas Palace in Vadodara, Gujarat

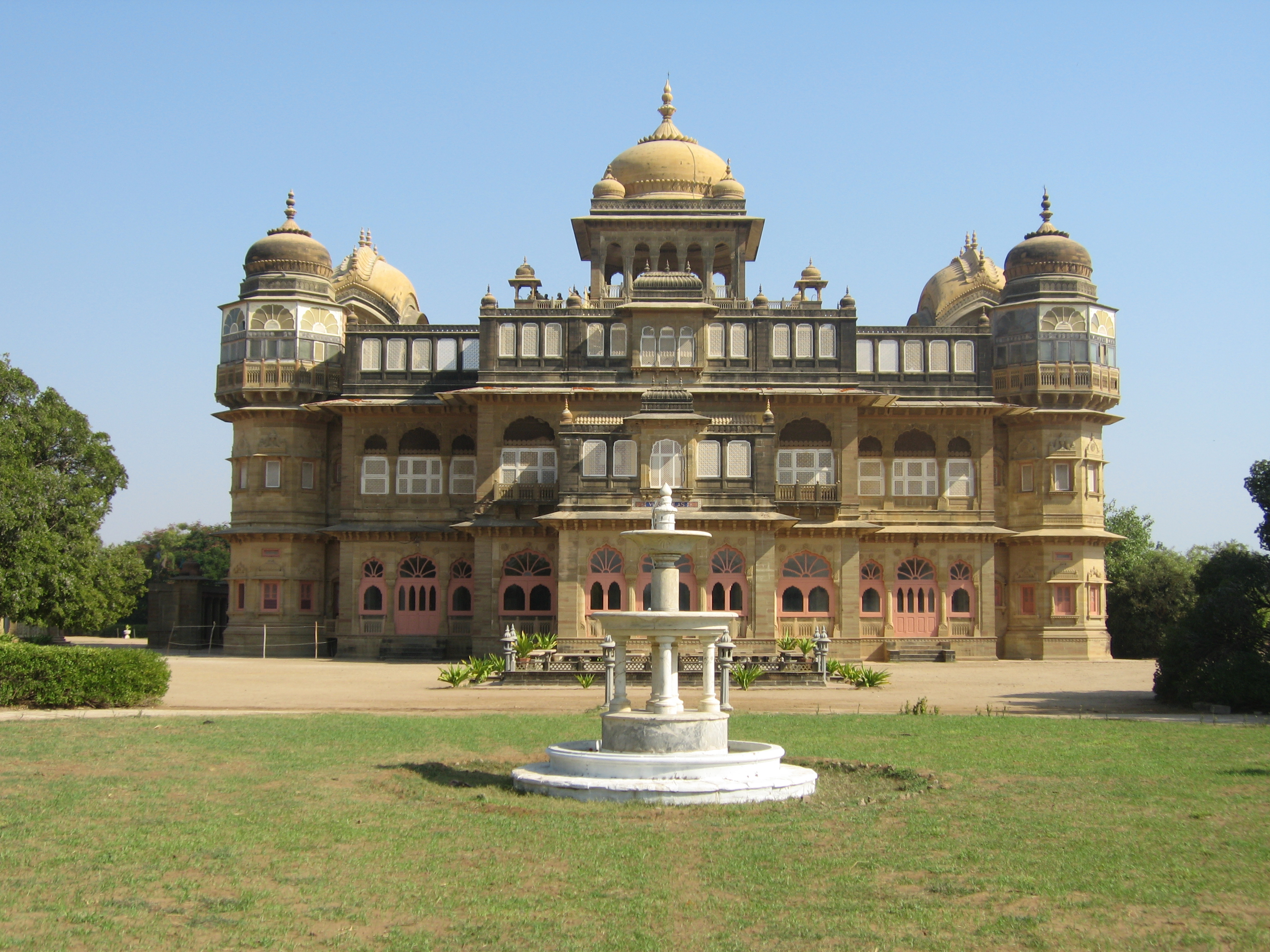
Vijay Vilas Palace

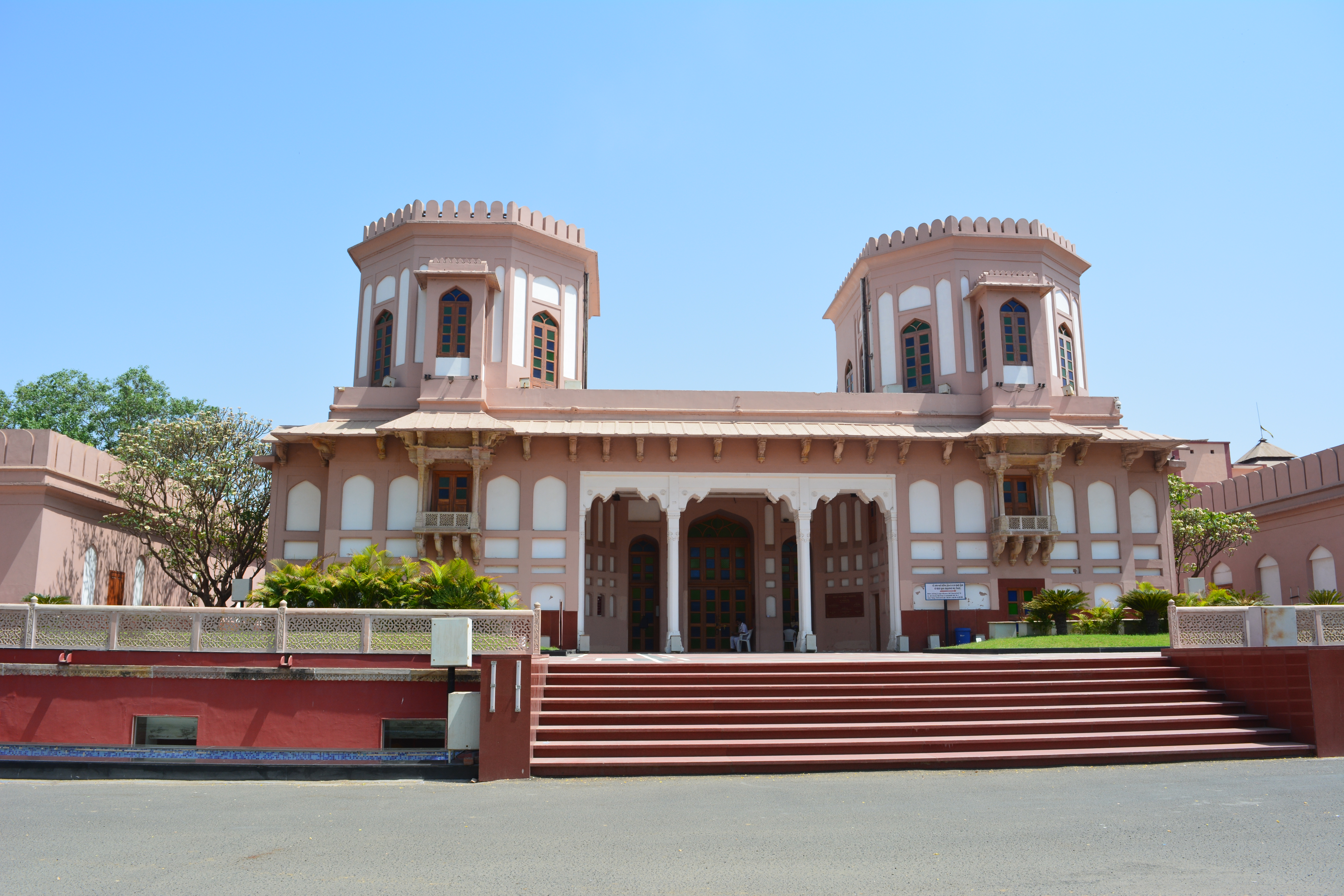
Moti Shahi Mahal, now Sardar Vallabhbhai Patel National Memorial

- Laxmi Vilas Palace, seat of the Maharajah of Baroda - Vadodara
- Aina Mahal, royal residence of ruler of Cutch State - Kutch
- Vijay Vilas Palace, Mandavi, royal residence of rulers of Kutch State - Kutch
- Prag Mahal, royal palace of rulers of Kutch - Kutch
- Nilambaug Palace, royal Palace of Rulers of Bhavnagar - Bhavnagar
- Aaina Mahal - Junagadh.
- Sardar Baugh Palace - Junagadh.
- Rang Mahal- Junagadh.
- Raj Mahal - Junagadh.
- Ranjit Vilas Palace - Palace of Thakore Sahebs of Rajkot - Rajkot
- Ranjit Vilas Palace - Morbi
- Makarpura Palace - Vadodara
- Huzoor Palace - Porbandar
- Huzoor Palace, Gondal - Rajkot
- Balaram Palace - Banaskantha
- Moti Shahi Mahal, now a museum - Ahmedabad
- Naulakha Palace - Rajkot
- Riverside Palace - Rajkot
- Rajmahal - Mehsana
- Nazarbaug Palace - Vadodara
- Pratap Villas Palace - Vadodara
- New Palace - Morbi
- Royal Oasis - Morbi
- Sharadbaugh Palace - Kutch
- Utelia Palace - Ahmedabad
- Dowlat Villas Palace - Sabarkantha
- Lakhota Palace - Jamnagar
- Sharad Baug Palace - Kutch
- Ambika Nivas Palace - Muli, Surendranagar
- Indrajit-Padmini Mahal (Vadia Palace) - Narmada
- Bhav Vilas Palace - Bhavnagar
- Daulat Mahal - Sabarkantha
- Jorawar Palace - Palanpur, Banaskantha

== Haryana ==
- Jal Mahal - Mahendragarh
- Nahar Singh Mahal - Faridabad
- Pataudi Palace - Gurgaon
- Firoz Shah palace - Hisar
- Gurjari Mahal - Hisar
- Sheesh Mahal - Farrukhnagar, Gurugram
- Madhogarh Palace - Mahendragarh

== Himachal Pradesh ==
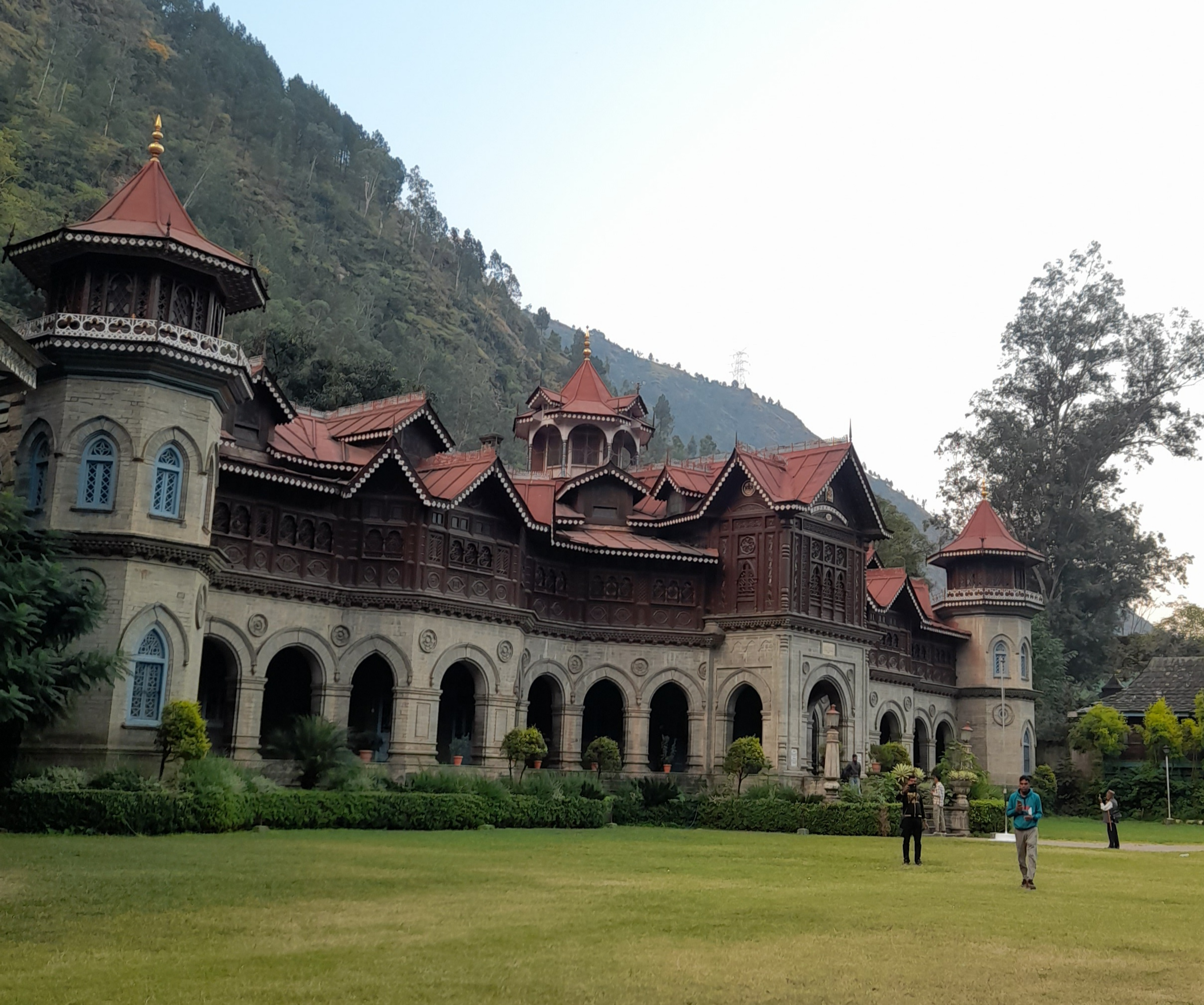
Padam Palace

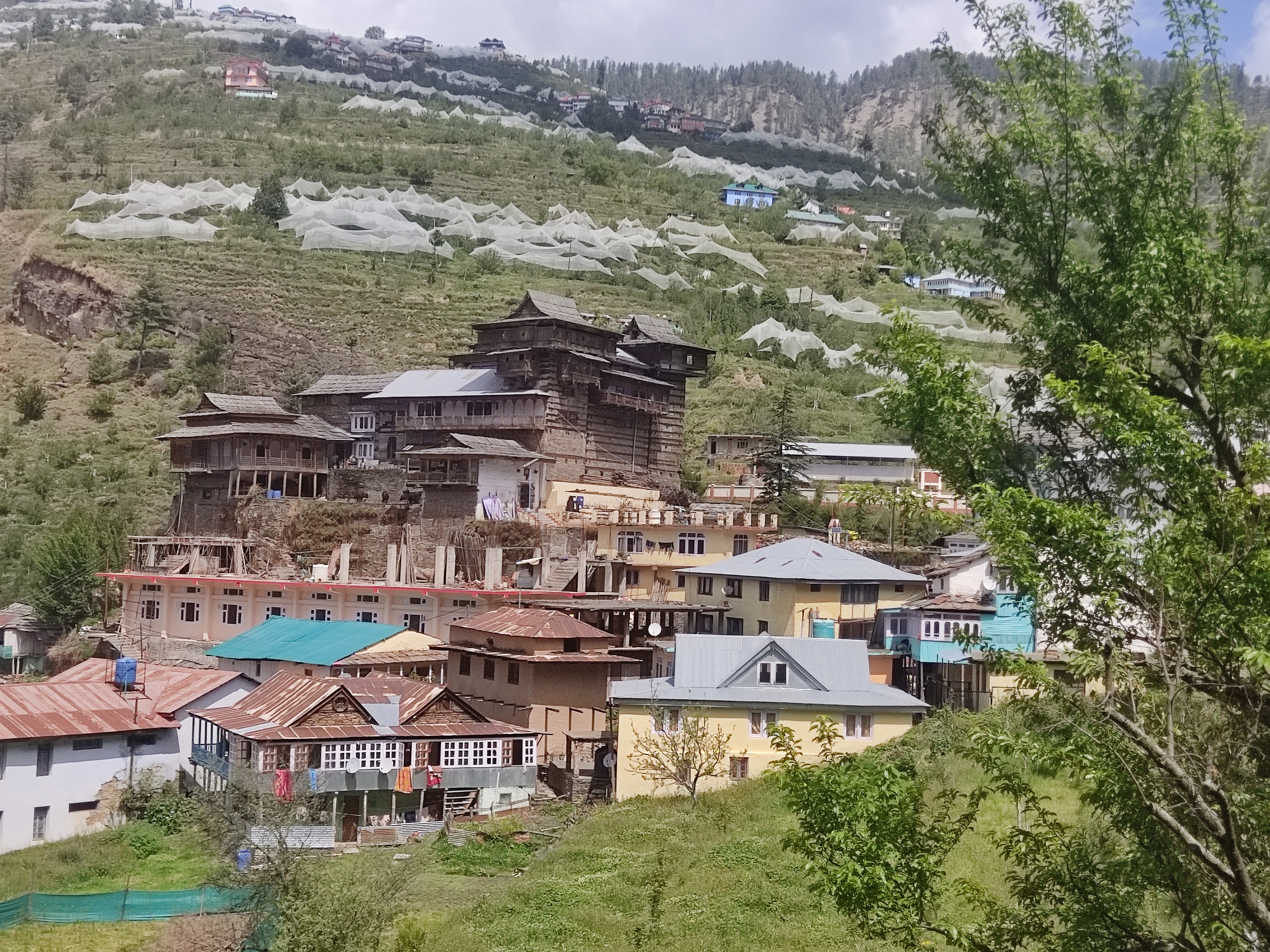
Deori Khaneti Fort

- Bantony Castle - Shimla
- Gorton Castle - Shimla
- Rothney Castle - Shimla
- The Sterling Castle - Shimla
- Rupi Palace - Kullu
- Jubbal Palace - Shimla
- Katoch Palace - Tira Sujanpur, Hamripur
- Rashtrapati Niwas - Shimla
- Royal Palace - Shimla
- Kunihar Palace - Solan
- Kuthar Palace - Solan
- Taragarh Palace - Kangra
- Beja Palace - Kasauli, Solan
- Padam Palace - Rampur Bushahr, Shimla
- Khangsar Palace - Lahaul and Spiti
- Raj Mahal - Mandi
- Rang Mahal - Chamba
- Chail Palace - Solan
- Akhand Chandi Palace - Chamba
- Sunni Palace - Sunni, Shimla
- Kotkhai Palace - Kotkhai, Shimla
- Deori Khaneti Fort - Kotkhai, Shimla
- Mahlog fort - Solan

== Jammu and Kashmir ==
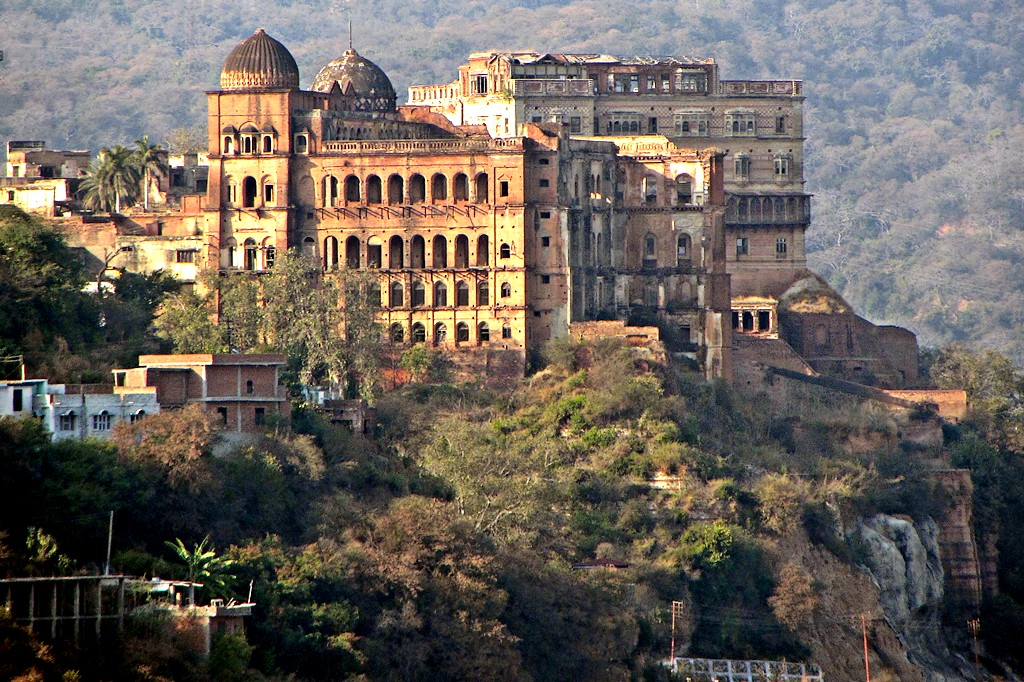
Mubarak Mandi Palace Complex

- Grand Palace, former royal residence, today hotel, Srinagar
- Mubarak Mandi Palace - Jammu
- Amar Mahal Palace - Jammu
- Gulab Bhavan - Srinagar
- Hari Niwas Palace - Jammu
- Sher Garhi Palace - Srinagar
- Ram Singh Palace - Ramnagar, Udhampur
- Maharaja Hari Singh Palace - Gulmarg, Baramulla

== Jharkhand ==
- Katras Palace - Dhanbad
- Ichagarh Rajbari - Ichagarh, Seraikela Kharsawan
- Navratangarh - Gumla

== Karnataka ==
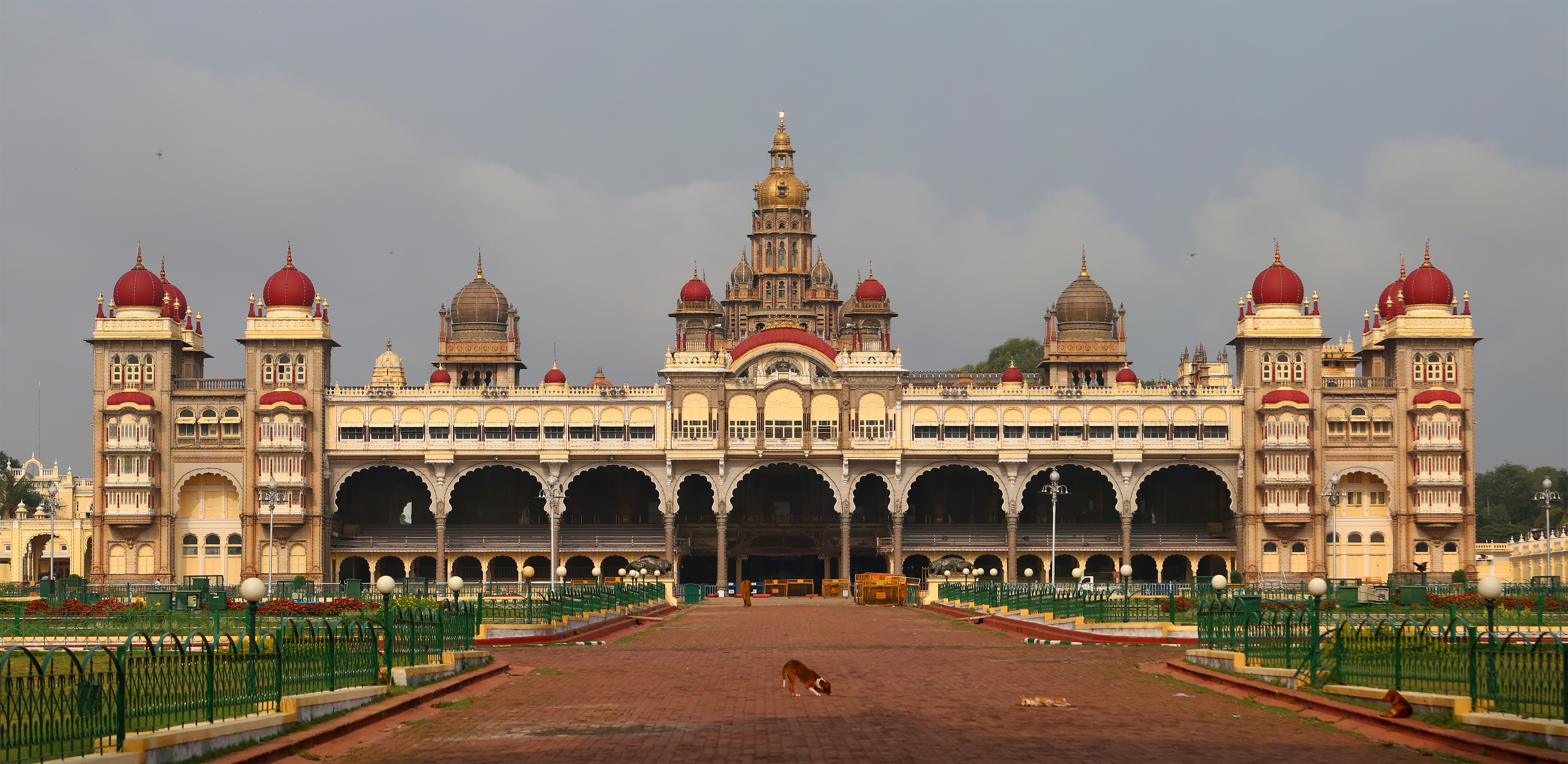
Amba Vilas Palace

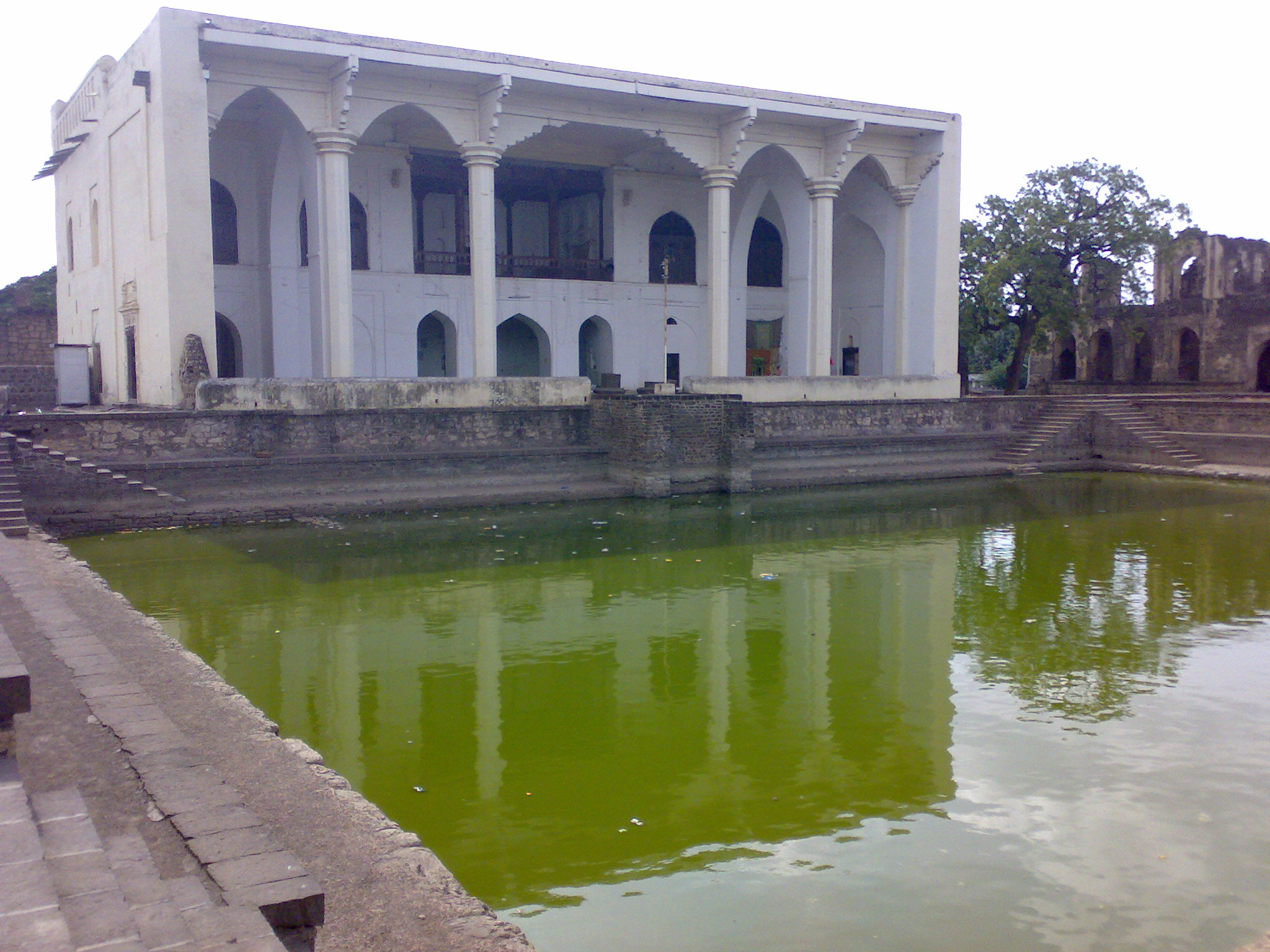
Asar Mahal

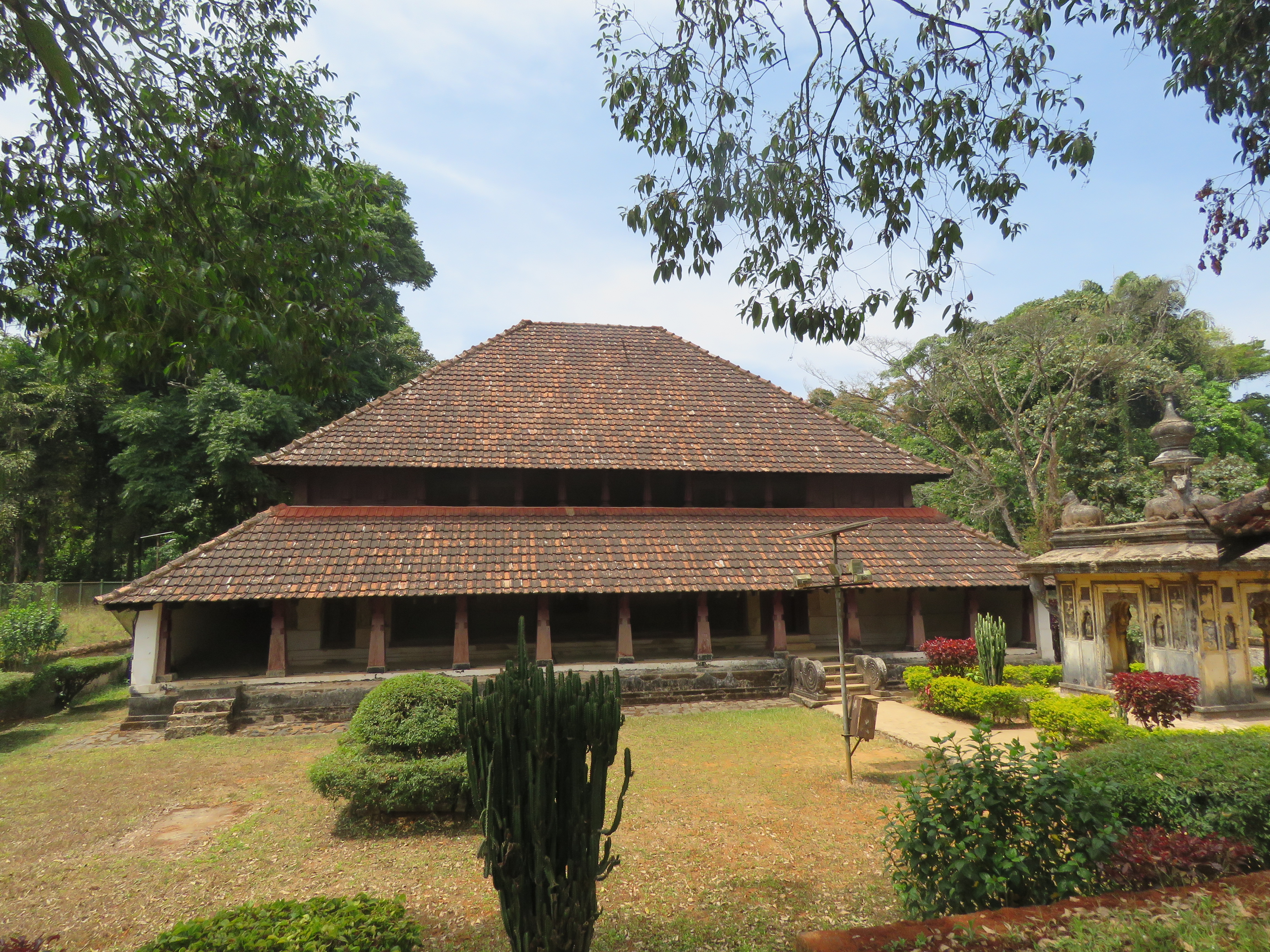
Nalknad Palace

- Amba Vilas Palace - Mysore
- Bangalore Palace - Bengaluru
- Cheluvamba Palace - Mysore
- Jayalakshmi Vilas - Mysore
- Jaganmohan Palace- Mysore
- Rajendra Vilas - Mysore
- Karanji Vilas Palace - Mysore
- Lalitha Mahal - Mysore
- Vasanth Mahal Palace - Mysore
- Lokranjan Mahal - Mysore
- Shivavilas Palace - Sandur
- Lotus Mahal - Hampi
- Shivappa Nayaka Palace - Shivamogga
- Nalknad Palace - Kodagu
- Tipu Sultan's Summer Palace - Bengaluru
- Daria Daulat Bagh - Srirangapatana
- Asar Mahal - Vijayapura
- Gagan Mahal - Vijayapura
- Rangin Mahal - Bidar
- Ramatirtha Palace - Jamakhandi, Bagalkot
- Madikeri Fort - Kodagu
- Suralu Mud Palace - Udupi
- Chittaranjan Palace - Mysore
- Vitla Palace - Dakshina Kannada
- Vasantha Mahal Palace - Mysore
- Chowta Palace - Moodabidri, Dakshina Kannada

== Kerala ==
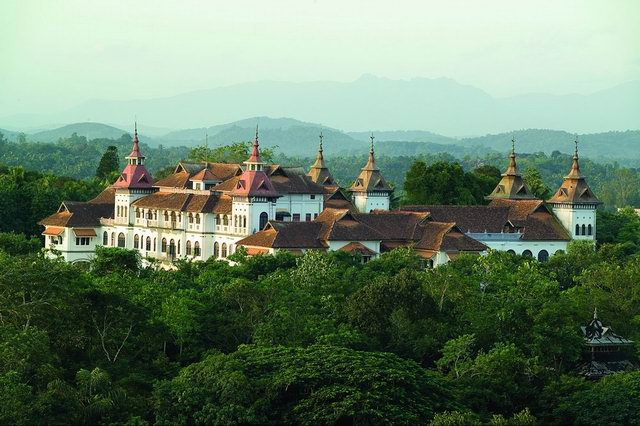
Kowdiar Palace

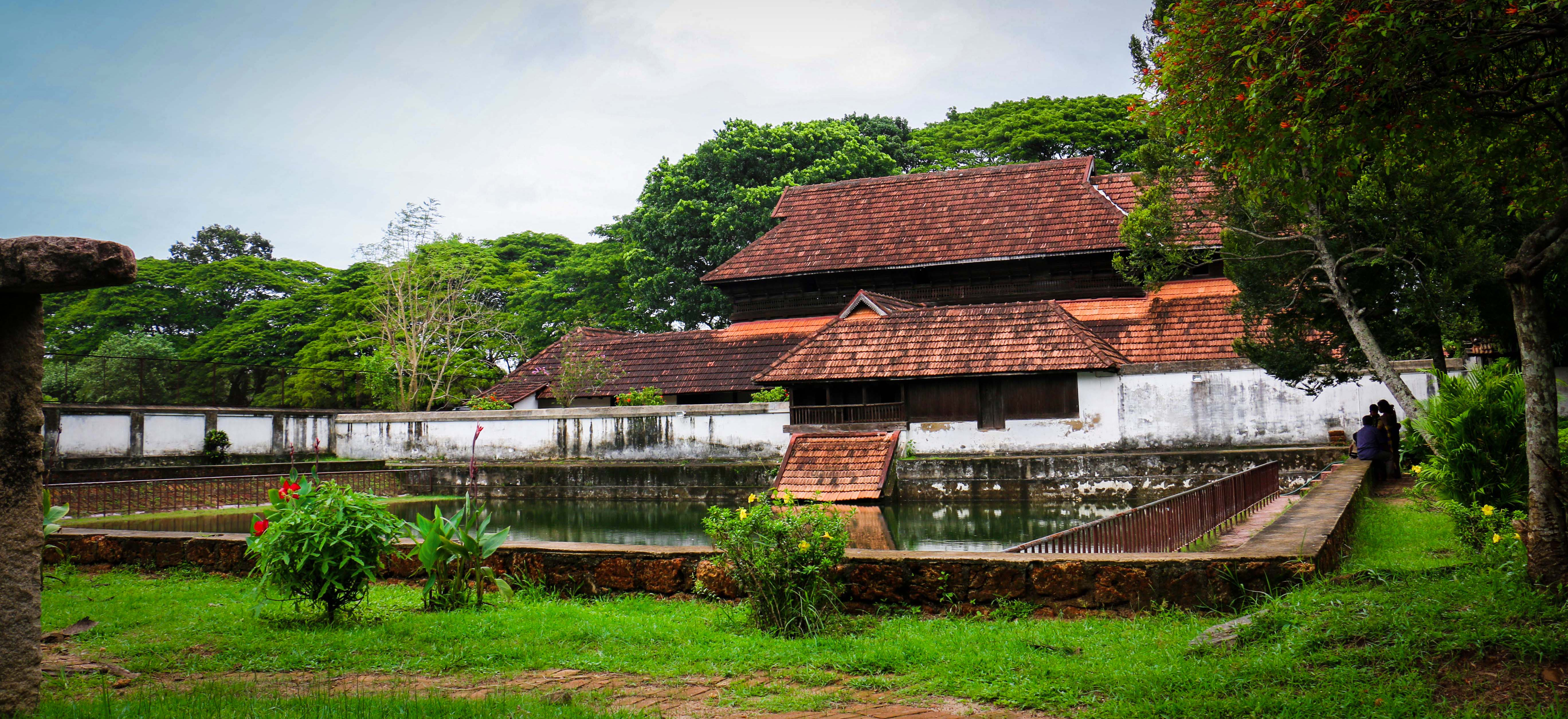
Krishnapuram Palace

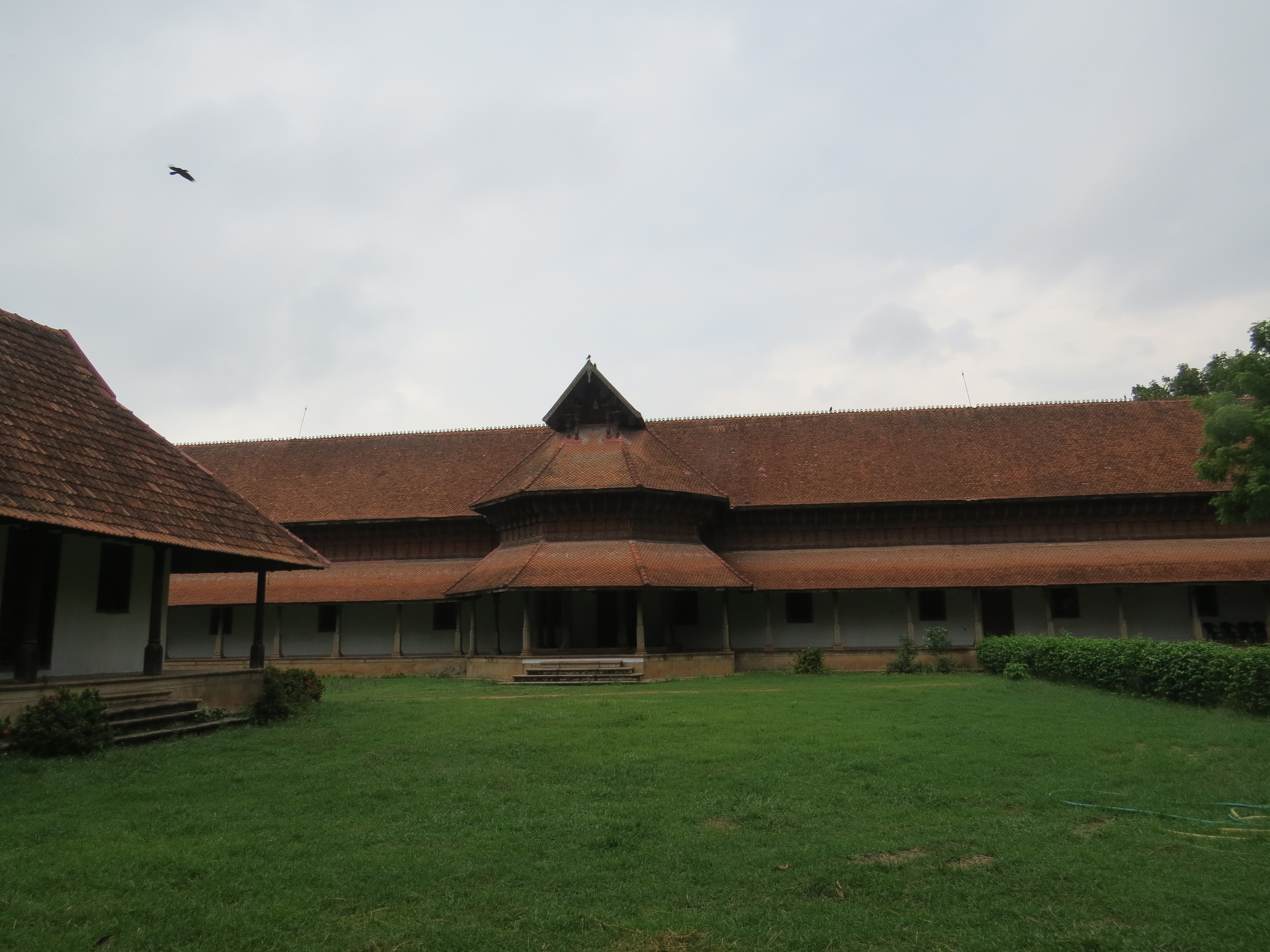
Kuthira Malika

- Kowdiar Palace - Residence of the Travancore Royal Family - Thiruvananthapuram
- Aranmula Mangattu Palace - Residence of the royal family of Aranmula - Pathanamthitta
- Kanakakkunnu Palace - Palace for welcoming guests of Travancore Royal Family. - Thiruvananthapuram
- Halcyon Castle - The Summer palace of The Travancore Royal family, constructed by Sethu Lakshmi Bayi, now converted to The Kovalam Palace under The Leela Kovalam - A Raviz Hotel, Kovalam, Thiruvananthapuram.
- Kuthira Malika, it was built by Swathi Thirunal Rama Varma of Travancore - Thiruvananthapuram
- Kilimanoor Palace, Birthplace of Raja Ravi Varma - Thiruvananthapuram
- Koyikkal Palace, Nedumangadu - Thiruvananthapuram
- Krishnapuram Palace - Kayamkulam, Alappuzha
- Sri Moolam Thirunal Palace, Rest house of Travancore Kings - Kollam
- Thevally Palace, Outhouse of erstwhile Travancore Kings - Kollam
- Cheena Kottaram - Chinnakkada, Kollam
- Hill Palace - Thrippunithura, Ernakulam
- Mattancherry Palace (Dutch Palace), Cochin, Ernakulam
- Bolgatty Palace, Bolgatty Island, Cochin, Ernakulam
- Shakthan Thampuran Palace, former residence of the Cochin royal family, now a museum - Thrissur
- British Residency, Built by Col. John Munro - Kollam
- Nedumpuram Palace - Pathanamthitta
- Lakshmipuram Palace, it is the royal palace of the Parappanad royal families - Changanassery, Kottayam
- Satelmond Palace - Thiruvananthapuram
- Bhakti Vilas - Thiruvananthapuram
- Lok Bhavan - Thiruvananthapuram
- Kodungallur Kovilakam - Thrissur
- Kollengode Palace - Thrissur
- Merry Lodge Palace - Thrissur
- Punnathurkotta - Thrissur
- Aluva Palace - Kochi, Ernakulam
- Neerazhi Palace - Kottayam
- Arakkalkettu - Kannur
- Kavalappara Palace - Palakkad
- Maipady Palace - Kasaragod
- Lake Palace - Thekkady, Idukki
- Ammachi Kottaram - Peermade, Idukki
- Kottarakkara Palace - Kottarakkara, Kollam
- Nileshwar Palace - Kasaragod

== Ladakh ==
- Leh Palace, a palace was constructed circa 1600 by Sengge Namgyal of the Namgyal dynasty of Ladakh. - Leh
- Shey Palace - Leh
- Zamskhang Palace - Nubra
- Palace of Sonam-Dorje - Alchi, Sham
- Stok Palace - Leh

== Madhya Pradesh ==
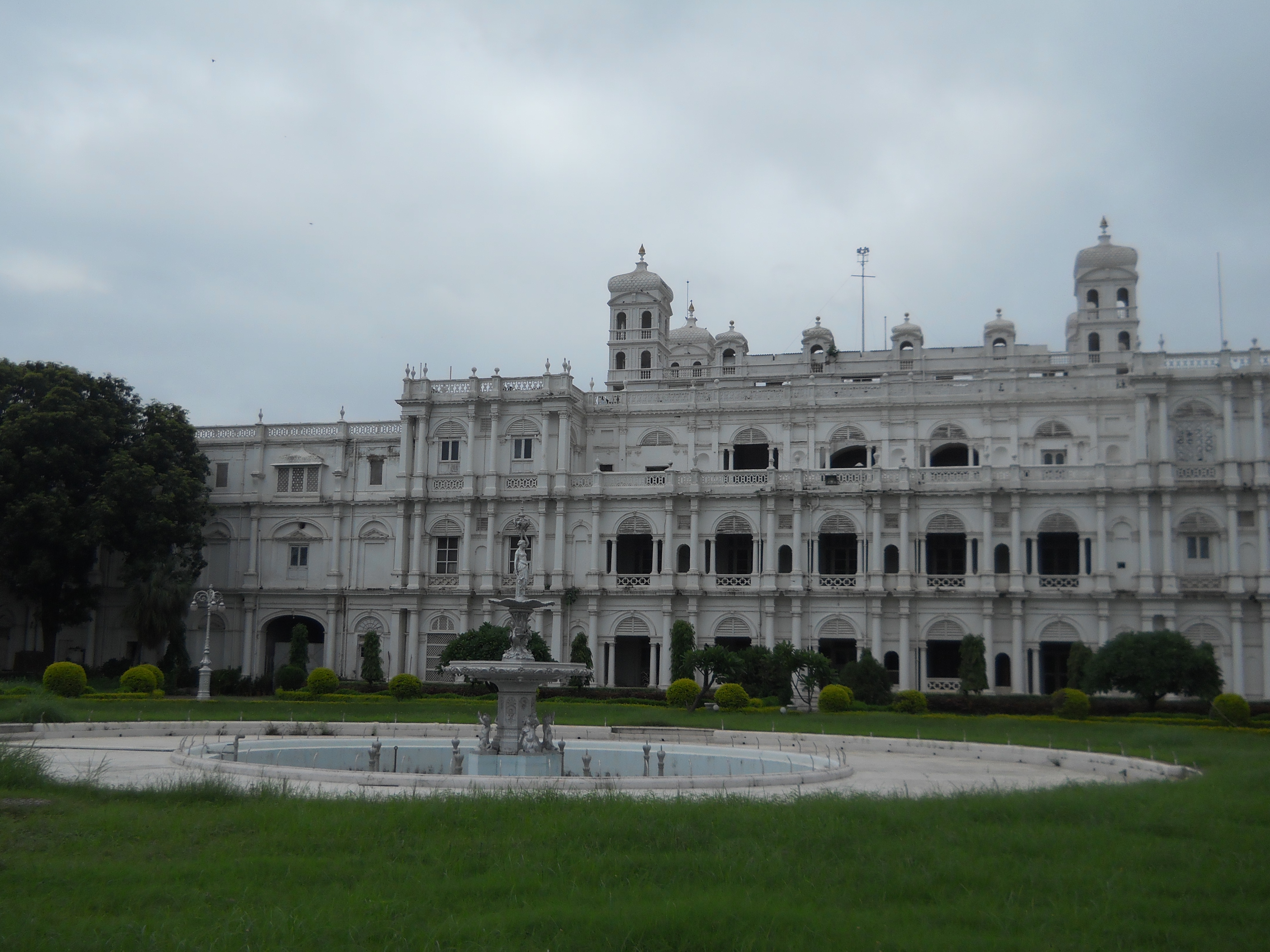
Jai Vilas Mahal, Madhya Pradesh

Sailana Palace, Madhya Pradesh

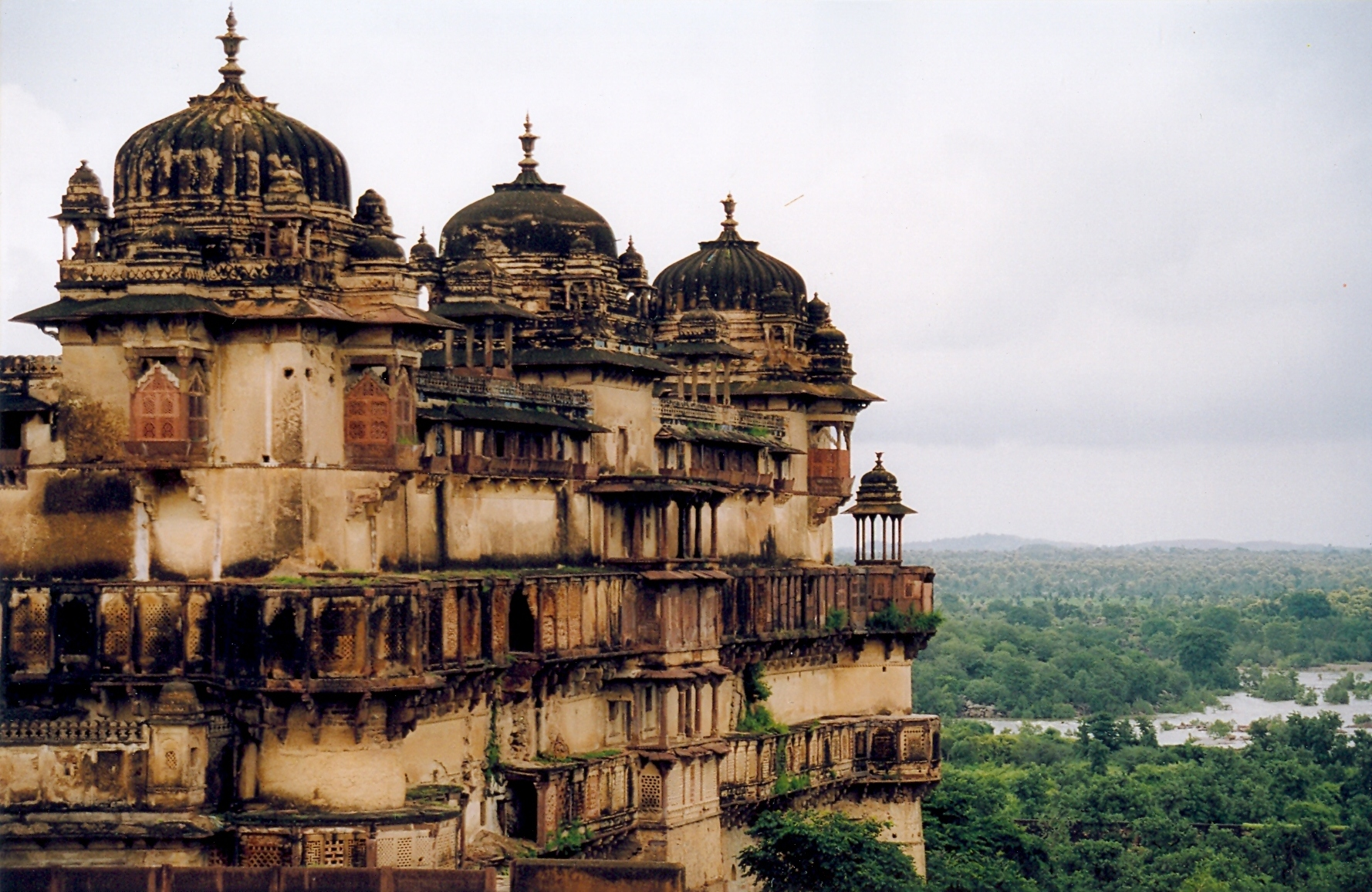
Orchha Palace, Madhya Pradesh

- Jai Vilas Mahal - Gwalior
- Lal Bagh Palace - Indore
- Rajwada Palace - Indore
- Raj Mahal Palace - Kathiwada, Alirajpur
- Rajwada Palace - Alirajpur
- Rajwada Palace - Jhabua
- Jaswant Niwas Palace - Sailana, Ratlam
- Rang Mahal Palace - Sailana, Ratlam
- Raj Mahal Palace - Sitamau, Mandsaur
- Laduna Palace - Sitamau, Mandsaur
- City Palace - Dhar
- Jheera bagh Palace - Dhar
- Datia Palace - Datia
- Orchha palace - Orchha, Niwari
- Jahangir Mahal - Orchha, Niwari
- Govindgarh Palace - Rewa
- Gohar Mahal - Bhopal
- Shaukat Mahal - Bhopal
- Moti Mahal - Mandla
- Kamlapati Palace - Bhopal
- Hindola Mahal - Dhar
- Taj Mahal (palace) - Bhopal
- Ranjit Vilas Palace - Ratlam
- Sailana Palace - Ratlam
- Shiv Vilas Palace - Indore
- Jahaz Mahal - Dhar
- Baz Bahadur's Palace - Dhar
- Ajaigarh Palace - Panna
- Pravin Rai Mahal - Niwari
- Mandhata Mahal - Khandwa
- Chaman Mahal - Bhopal
- Royal Palace of Maheshwar - Khargone
- Moti Mahal - Gwalior

== Maharashtra ==
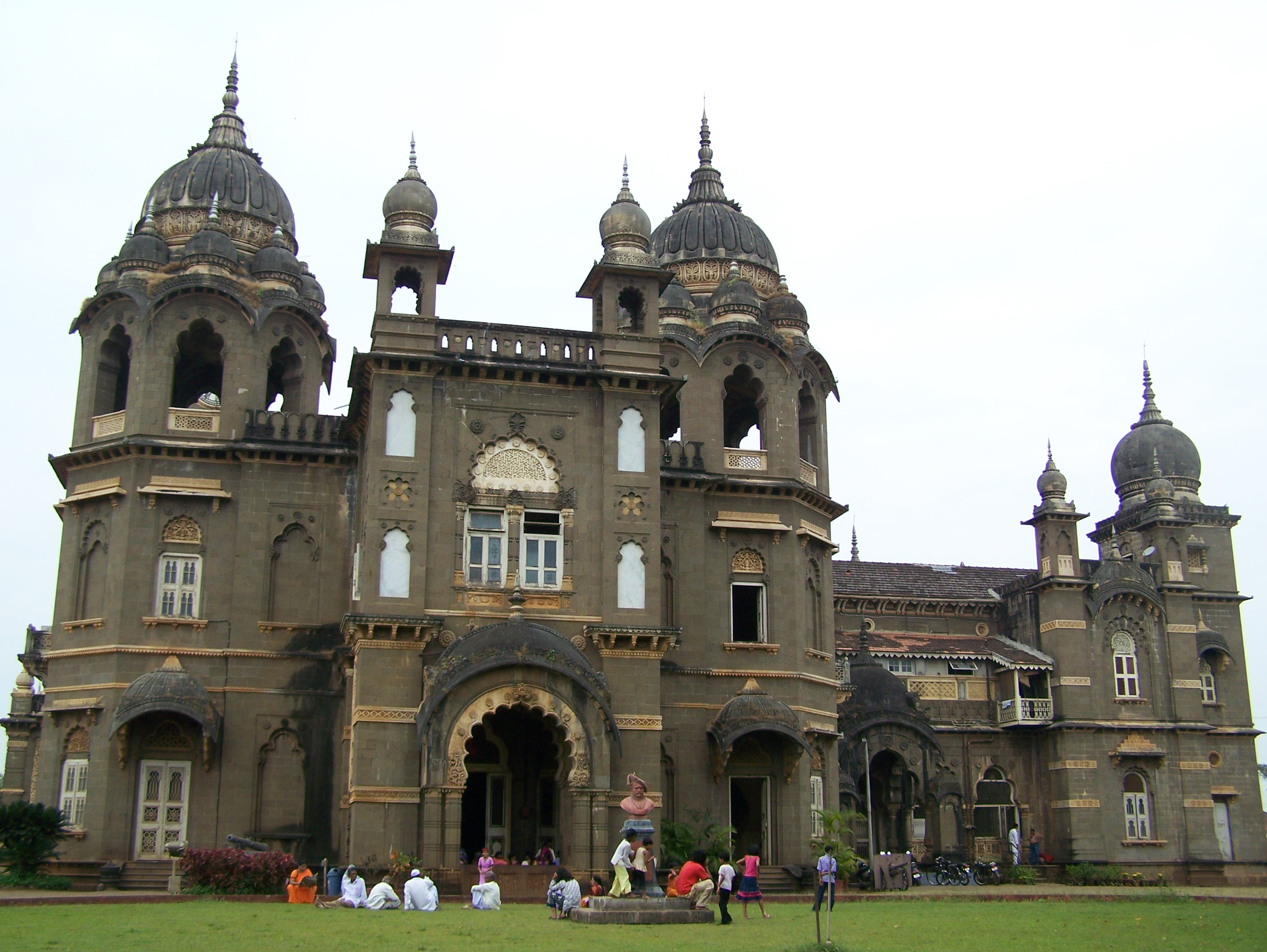
New Palace, Kolhapur

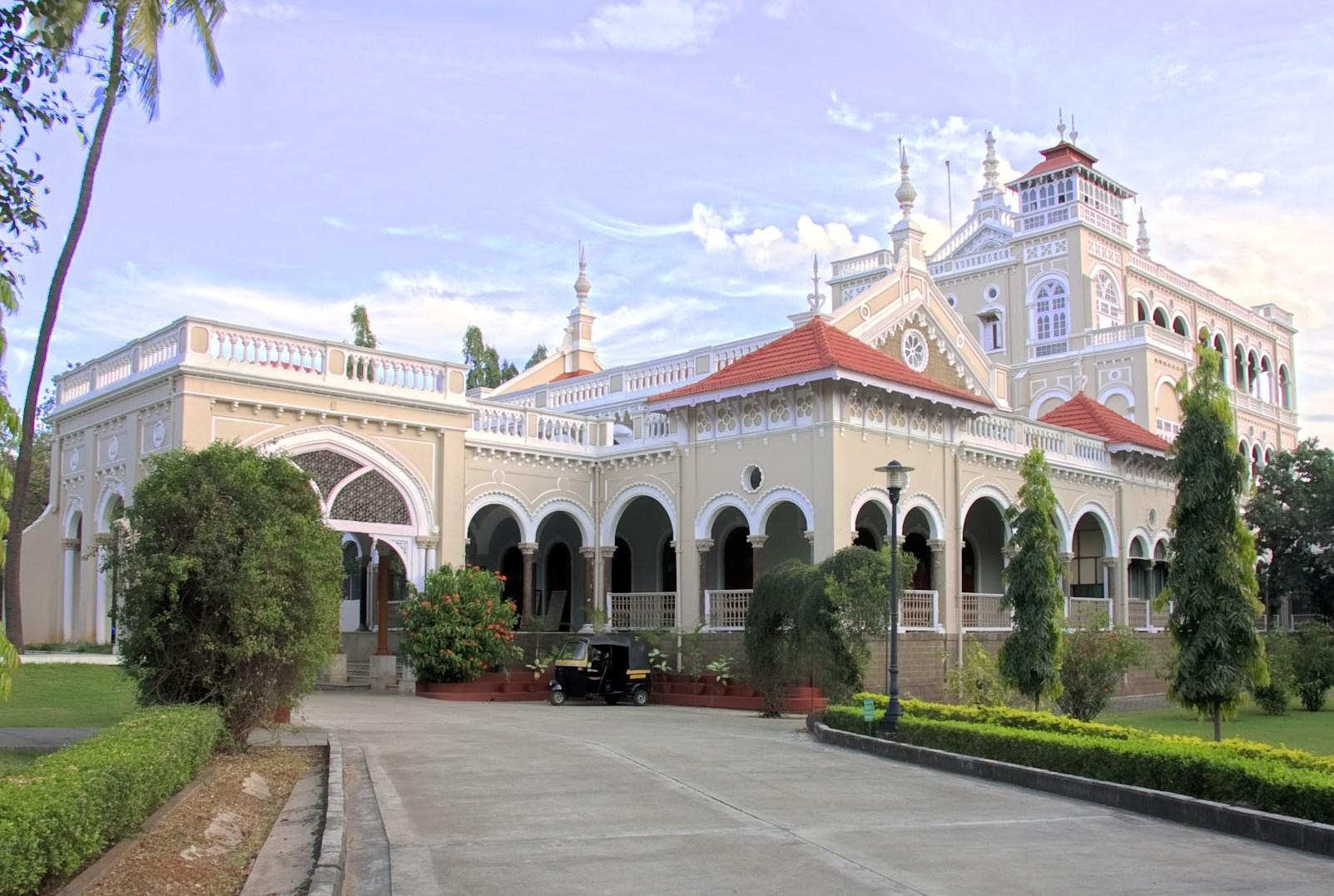
Aga Khan Palace

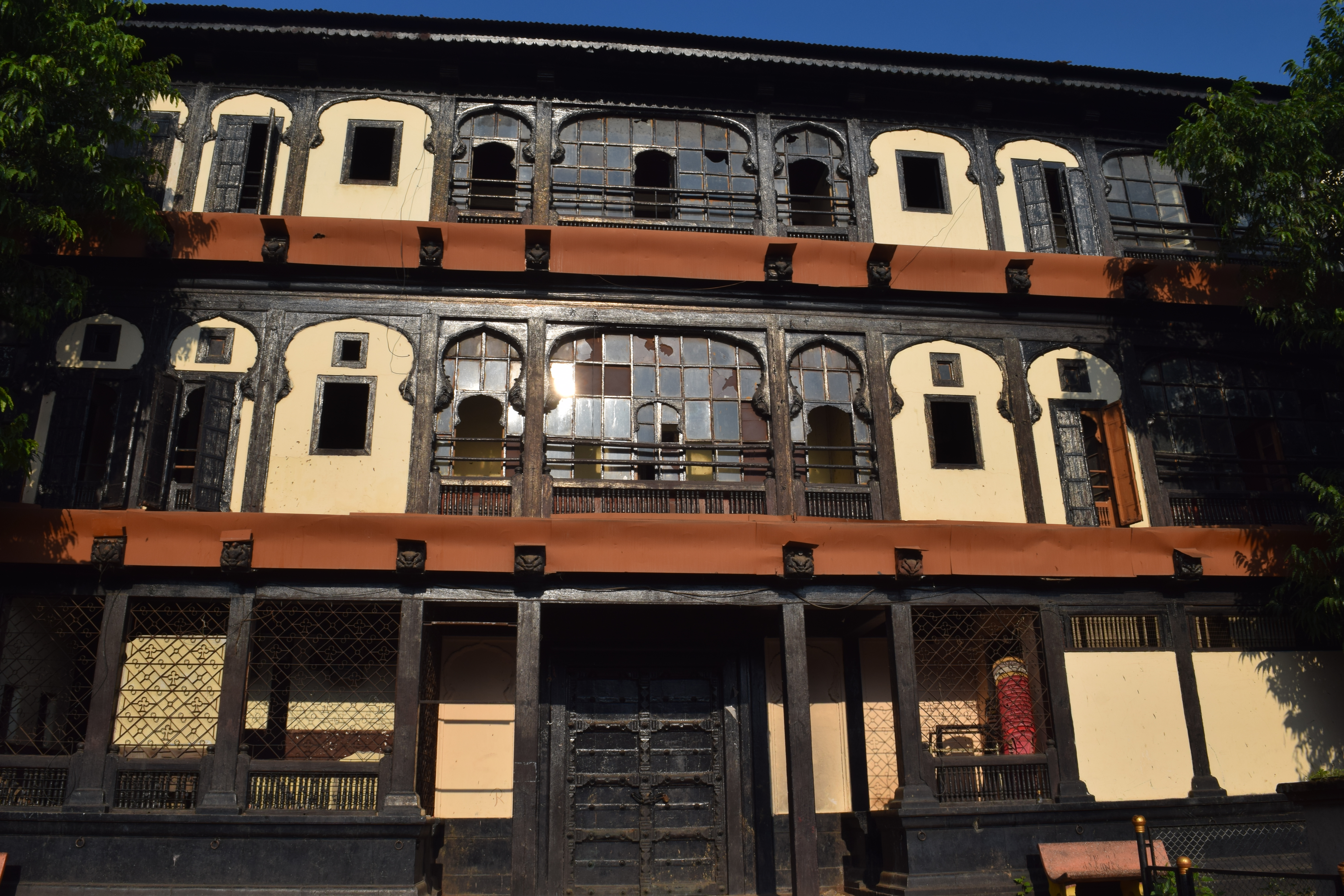
Nava Rajwada

- Royal Thibaw Palace, where last king of Myanmar was exiled. -Ratnagiri
- Jai Vilas Palace - Palghar
- Senior Bhonsle palace seat of Maharaja of Nagpur - Nagpur
- Junior Bhonsle palace royal family of Nagpur - Nagpur
- Bakabai Wada Residence of queen Bakabai (wife of raghuji Bhonsle II) - Nagpur
- Chitnavis Wada Residence of Chitnavis Family, - Nagpur
- New Palace - Seat of Maharaja of Kolhapur - Kolhapur
- Aga Khan Palace - Pune
- Lal Mahal - Pune
- Qila-e-Ark - Aurangabad
- Naukhanda palace - Aurangabad
- Farah Bagh - Ahmednagar
- Shalini Palace - Kolhapur
- Soneri Mahal - Aurangabad
- Sawantwadi Palace - Sawantwadi, Sindhudurg
- Bhor Rajwada - Bhor, Pune
- Old Rajwada (Juna Rajwada) - Satara
- New Rajwada (Nava Rajwada) - Satara
- Adalat Wada - Satara
- Rang Mahal - Chandwad, Nashik
- Ahmedganj Palace - Murud-Janjira, Raigad
- Ichalkaranji Palace - Ichalkaranji, Kolhapur
- Habshi Palace (Malik Amber Palace) - Junnar, Pune
- New Palace (Fatehsinh Mahal) - Akkalkot, Solapur
- Vishrambaug Wada - Pune

== Manipur ==
- Sanggai Yumpham - Imphal
- Sana Konung - Imphal

== Punjab ==
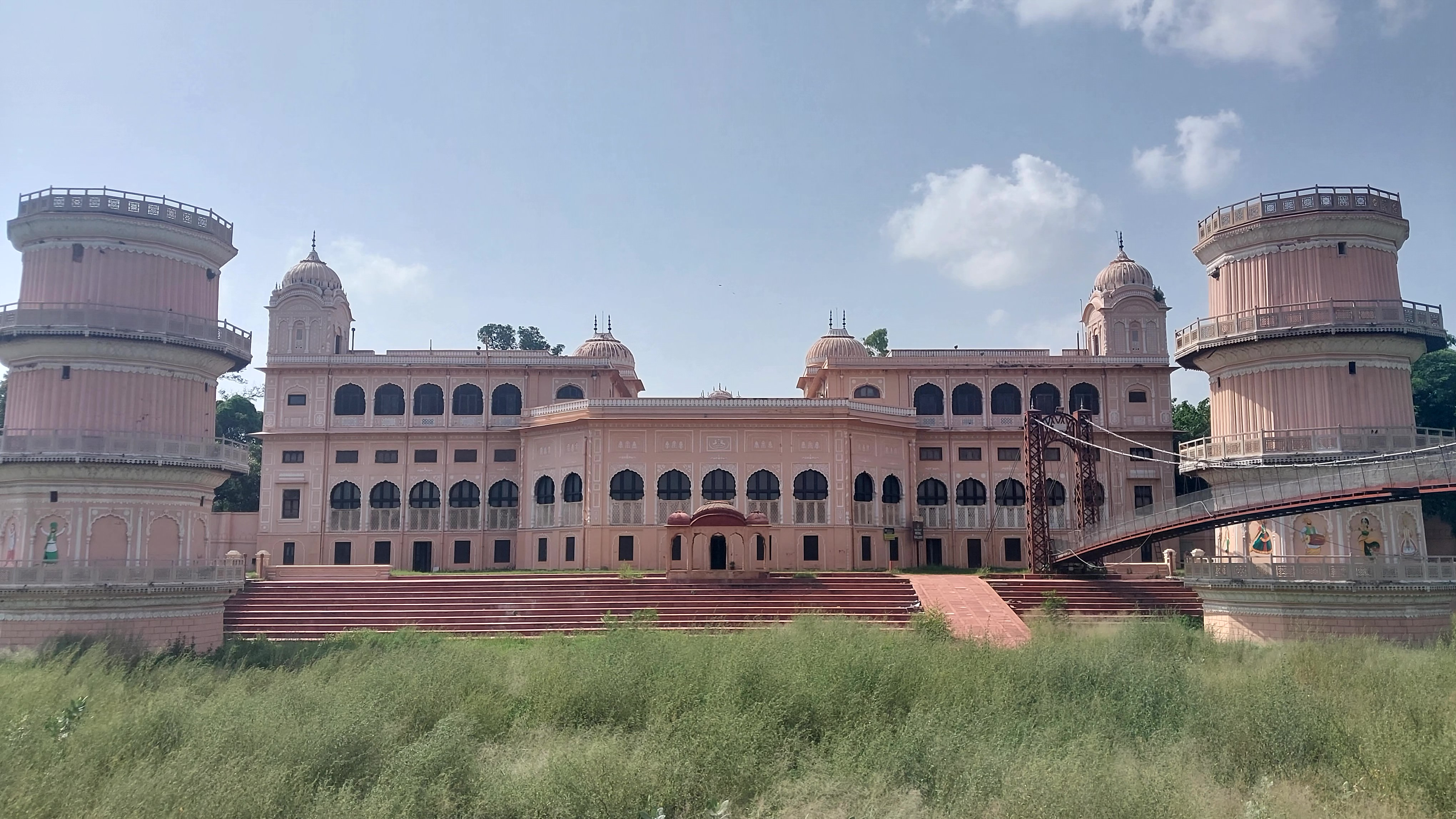
Sheesh Mahal, Patiala

- Old Moti Bagh Palace - Patiala
- New Moti Bagh Palace - Patiala
- Ram Bagh - Amritsar
- Qila Androon - Qila Mubarak complex, Patiala
- Jagatjit Palace, now Sainik School - Kapurthala
- Baradari Palace - Patiala
- Mubarak Manzil Palace - Malerkotla
- Sheesh Mahal - Patiala
- Hira Mahal- Nabha, Patiala

== Odisha ==
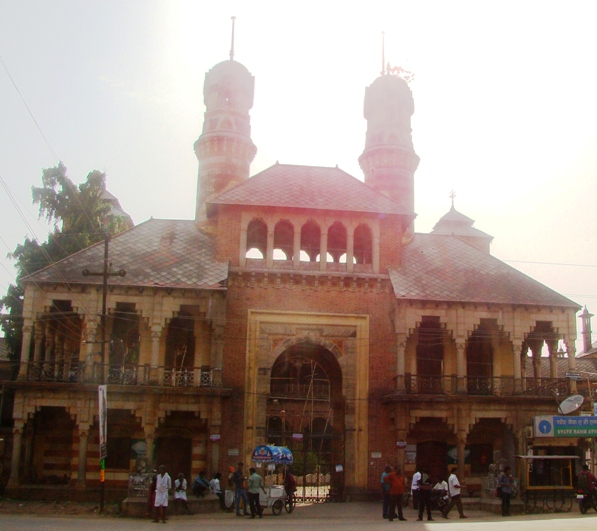
Gajapati Palace

- Aul Palace - royal family of Aali
- Gajlaxmi Palace, palace of Singhdeo dynasty, Dhenkanal princely state - Dhenkanal
- Belgadia Palace, palace of Bhanjja Dynasty of the Mayurbhanj state - Mayurbhanj
- Kanika Palace - Kendrapara
- Mayurbhanj Palace - Mayurbhanj
- Gajapati Palace - Gajapati
- Brundaban Palace - Gajapati
- Sailashree Palace - Balangir
- Nilagiri Palace - Nilagiri, Balasore
- Kalahandi Palace - Kalahandi
- Parikud Palace - Puri
- Narsinghpur Palace - Cuttack
- Talcher Palace - Angul
- Dharakote Maharaja Palace - Ganjam

== Rajasthan ==
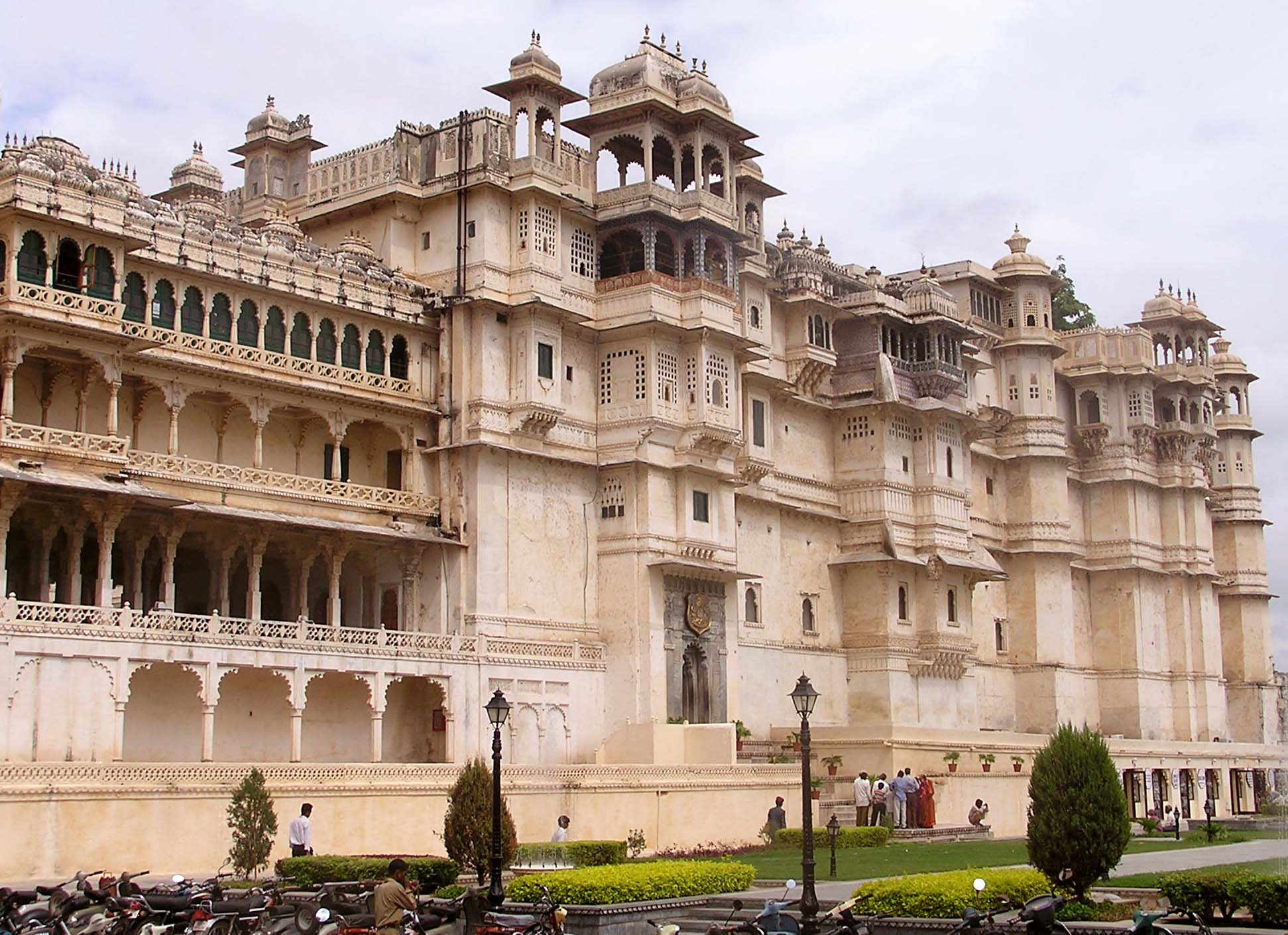
City Palace, Udaipur

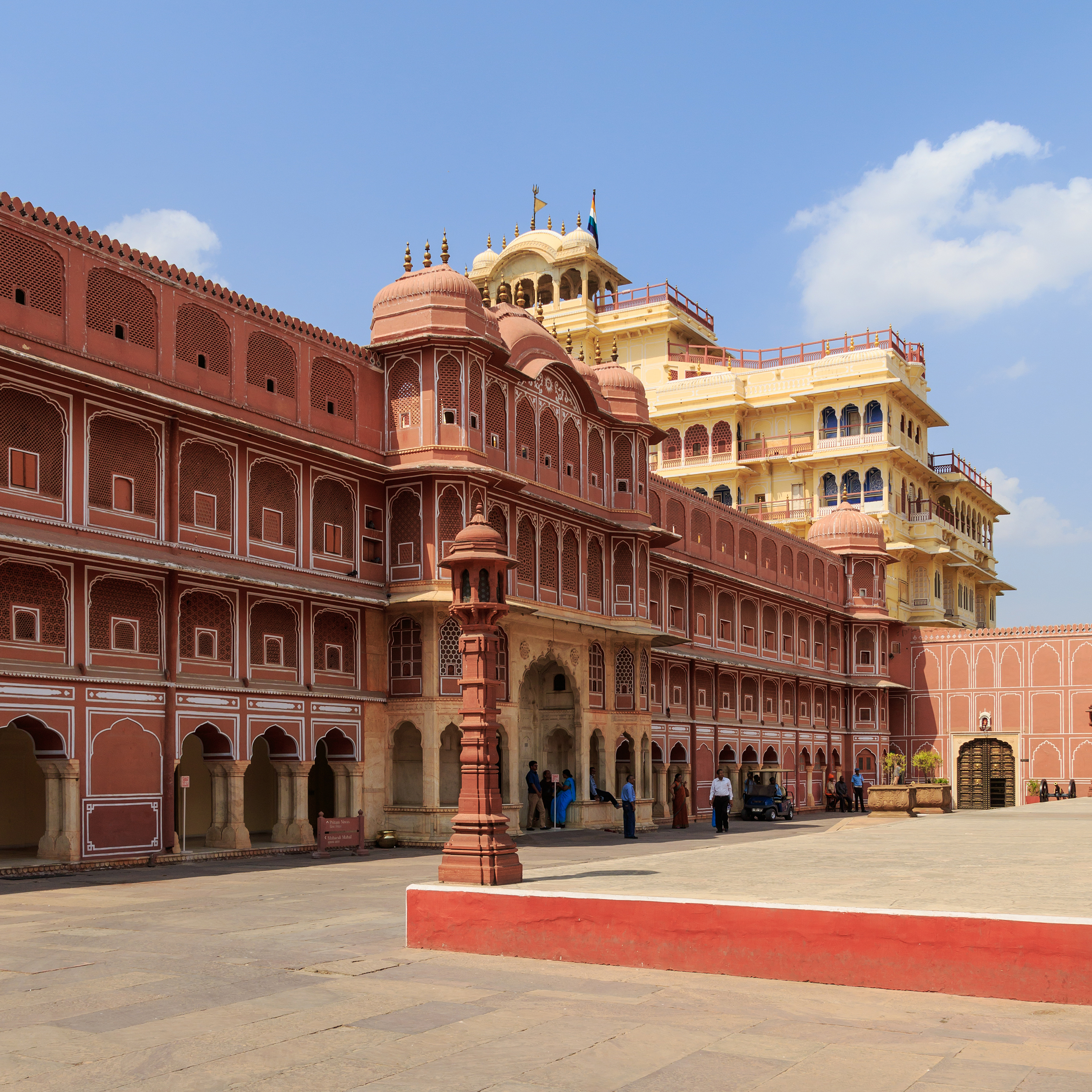
City Palace, Jaipur

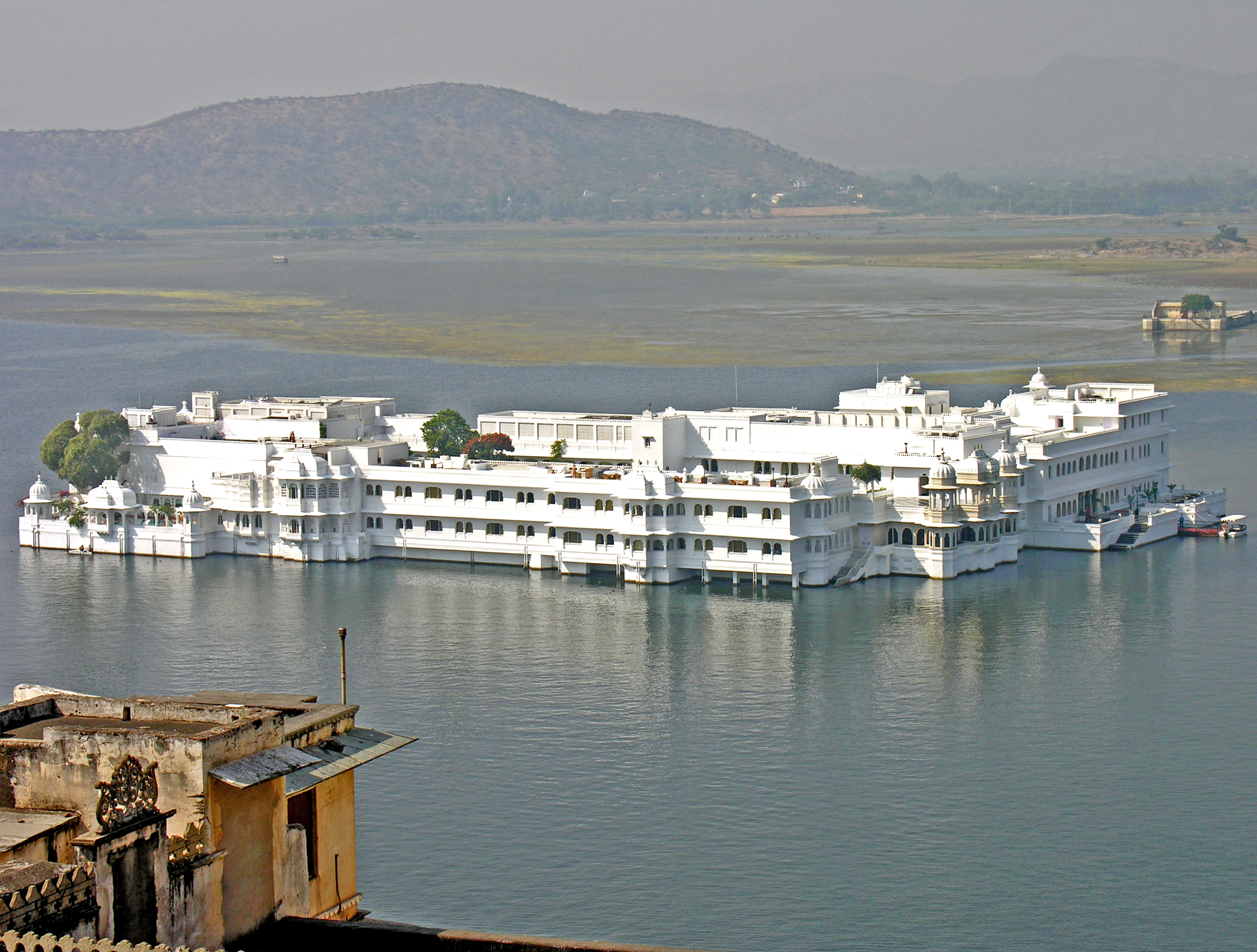
Jag Niwas (Lake Palace)

- Mundota Fort and Palace - former royal residence of the Mundota Family, today a luxury hotel, Jaipur
- Umaid Bhawan Palace - Seat of the Maharaja of Jodhpur
- Amber Palace (Amber Fort) - former royal residence, Jaipur
- Jag Mandir - palace built by Maharana Amar Singh, noted for giving refuge to Prince Khurram (Shah Jahan).
- Jag Mandir Palace - Kota
- Jag Niwas (Lake Palace) - former royal residence, Udaipur
- Jal Mahal - former royal residence, today hotel, Jaipur
- City Palace, Jaipur - Seat of the Maharaja of Jaipur
- City Palace, Udaipur - Seat of the Maharana of Udaipur
- Candra Mahal, Jaipur
- Lalgarh Palace - former royal residence, today hotel, Bikaner
- Gorbandh Palace, Jaisalmer
- Hawa Mahal (Palace of Winds) - former royal residence, Jaipur
- Narain Niwas Palace - former royal residence, today hotel, Jaipur
- Raj Mahal - former royal residence, Jaipur (today hotel)
- Samode Palace, former royal residence, today hotel - Jaipur
- Rambagh Palace, former residence of the Maharaja of Jaipur (today hotel) - Jaipur
- Garh Palace - Jhalawar
- Garh Palace - Kota
- Garh Palace - Bundi
- Juna Mahal - Dungarpur
- Udai Bilas Palace - Dungarpur
- Deeg Palace - Deeg
- Matiya Mahal - Hindaun, Karauli
- Hindaun Fort - Karauli
- Bissau Palace - Jaipur
- Khetri Mahal - Jhunjhunu
- Umed Bhawan Palace - Kota
- Shiv Niwas Palace - Udaipur
- Sisodiya Rani Bagh - Jaipur
- Phool Sagar Palace - Bundi
- Diggi Palace - Jaipur
- Devi Garh - Rajsamand
- Sajjan Garh Palace - Udaipur
- Mehrangarh - Jodhpur

== Sikkim ==
- Tsuklakhang Palace - Gangtok

== Tamil Nadu ==
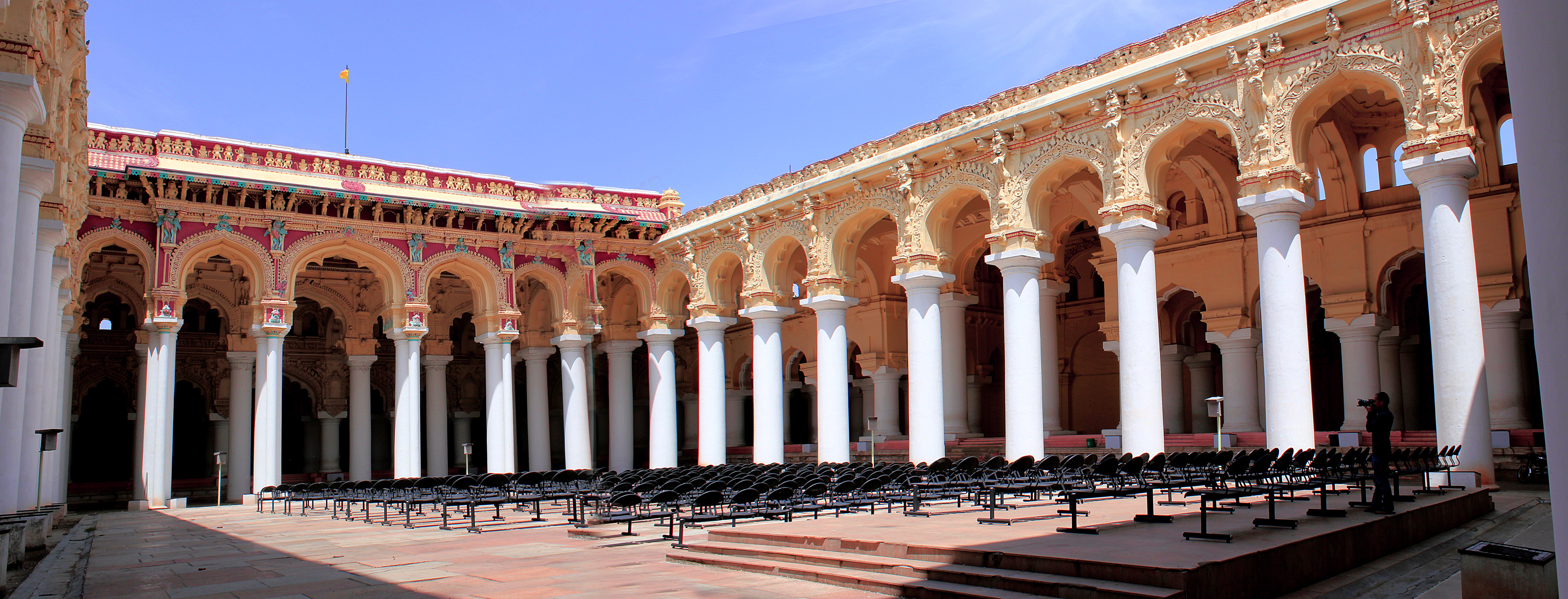
Thirumalai Palace

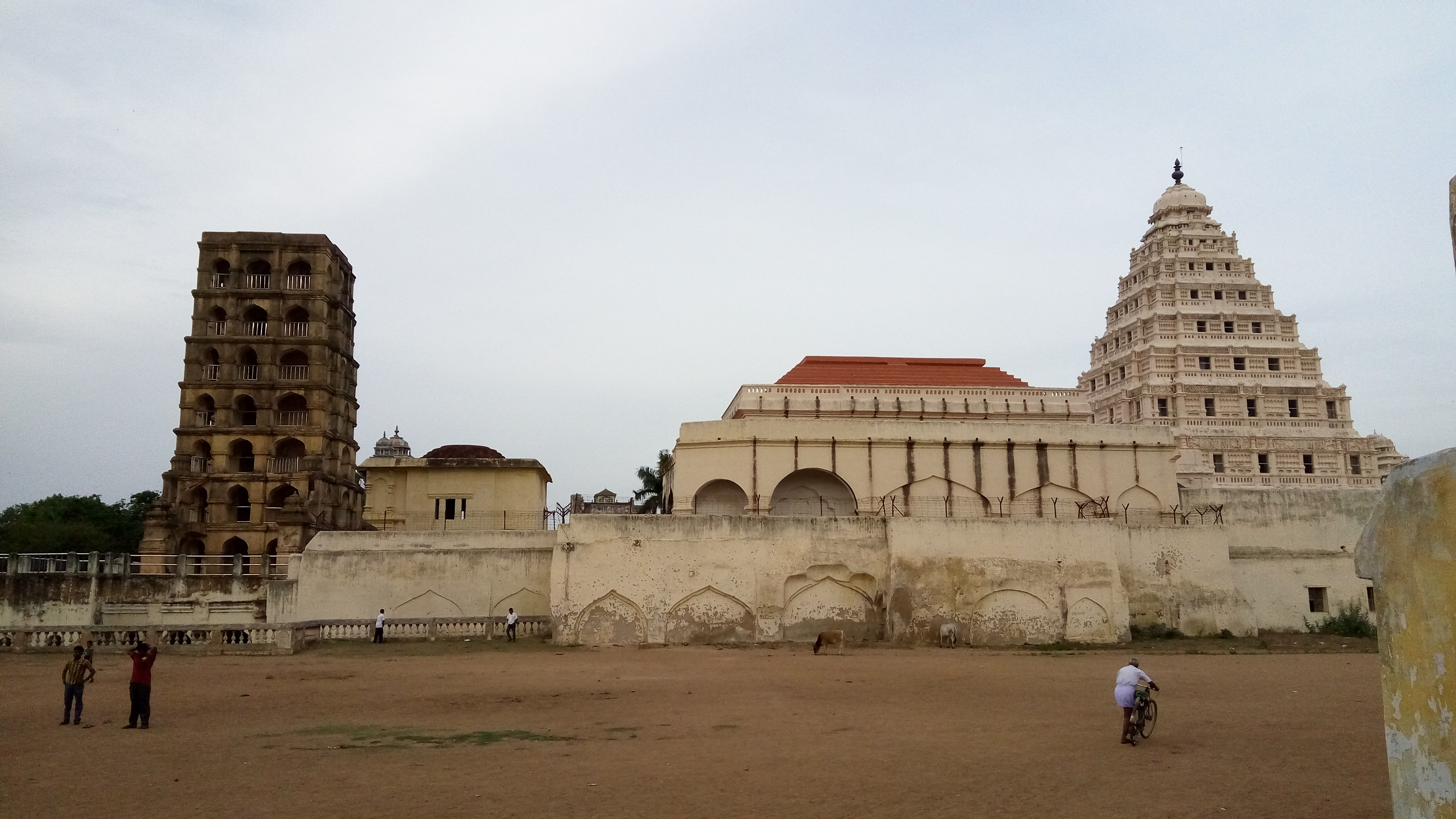
Thanjavur Maratha Palace

- Padmanabhapuram Palace - Padmanabhapuram, Kanyakumari
- Tamukkam Palace - Madurai
- Fernhills Palace - Ooty
- Thirumalai Nayakkar Mahal - Madurai
- Thanjavur Maratha Palace, Tanjavur
- Kanadukathan Palace, Sivaganga
- Attangudi Palace - Chettinad Palace House in Athangudi, Sivaganga
- Amir Mahal - Chennai
- Chokkanatha Nayak Palace - Tiruchirappalli
- Eraniel Palace - Kanyakumari
- Kuttalam Palace - Tenkasi
- Sivaganga Palace - Sivaganga
- Ramnad Palace - Madurai
- Gingee fort - Villupuram
- Puravipalayam Palace - Coimbatore
- Tirumalai Nayak's Palace - Srivilliputhur, Virudhunagar
- Ettappan's Palace - Ettayapuram, Thoothukudi
- Bodinayakkanur Zamin Palace - Theni
- Pudukkottai palace - Pudukkottai
- Nilakottai Palace - Dindigul
- Vettavalam Palace - Tiruvanamalai
- Zamin Palace - Aruppukottai, Virudhunagar

== Telangana ==
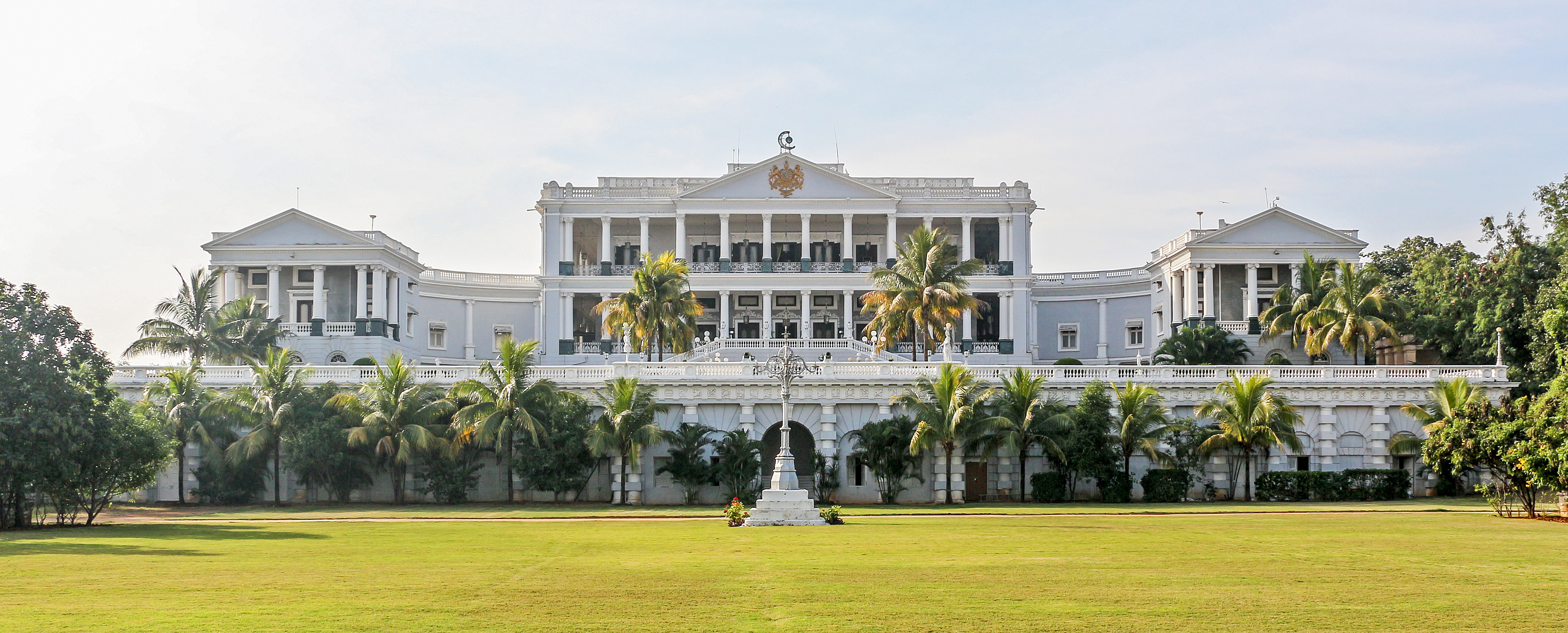
Falaknuma Palace

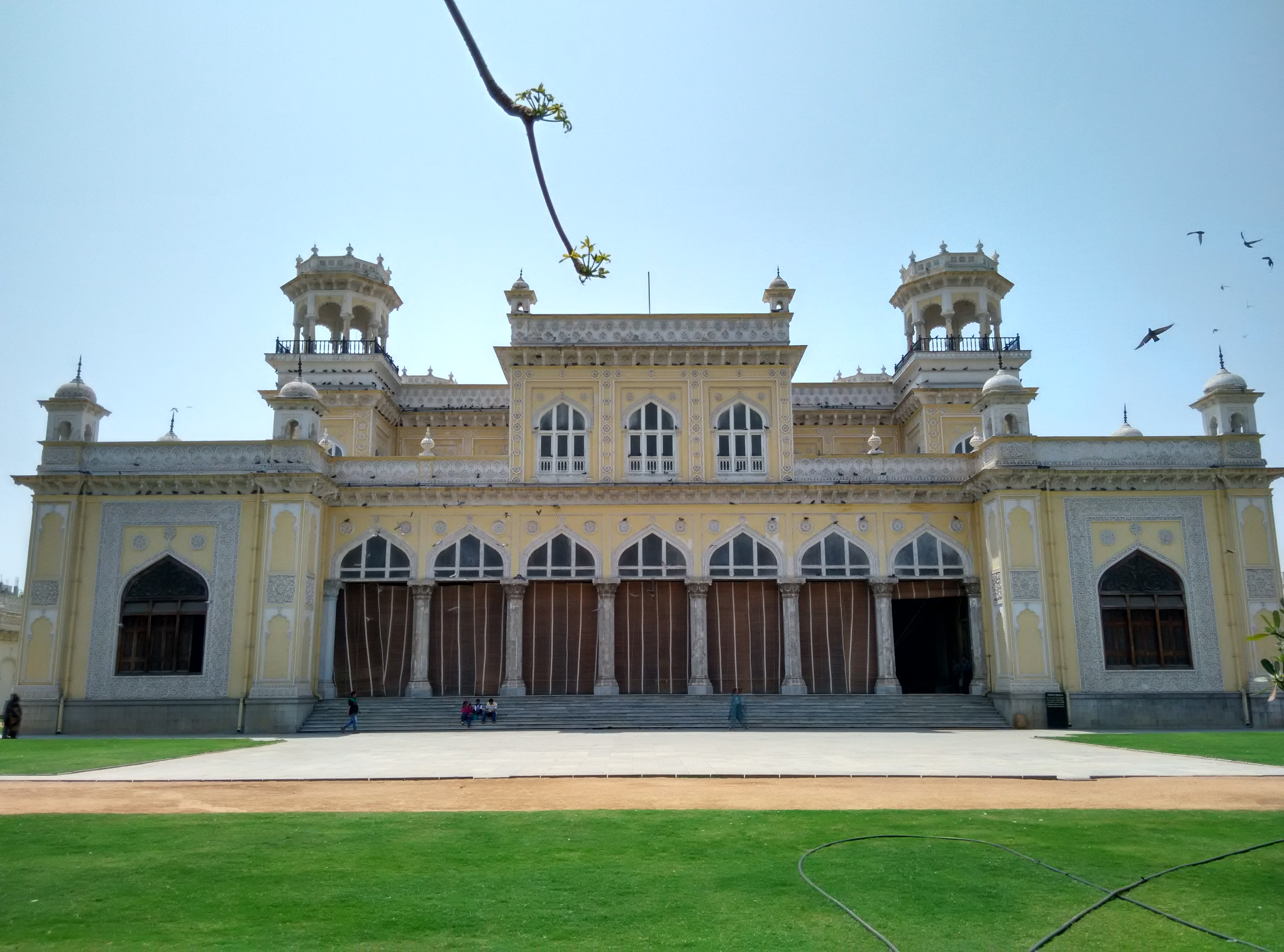
Chowmahalla Palace

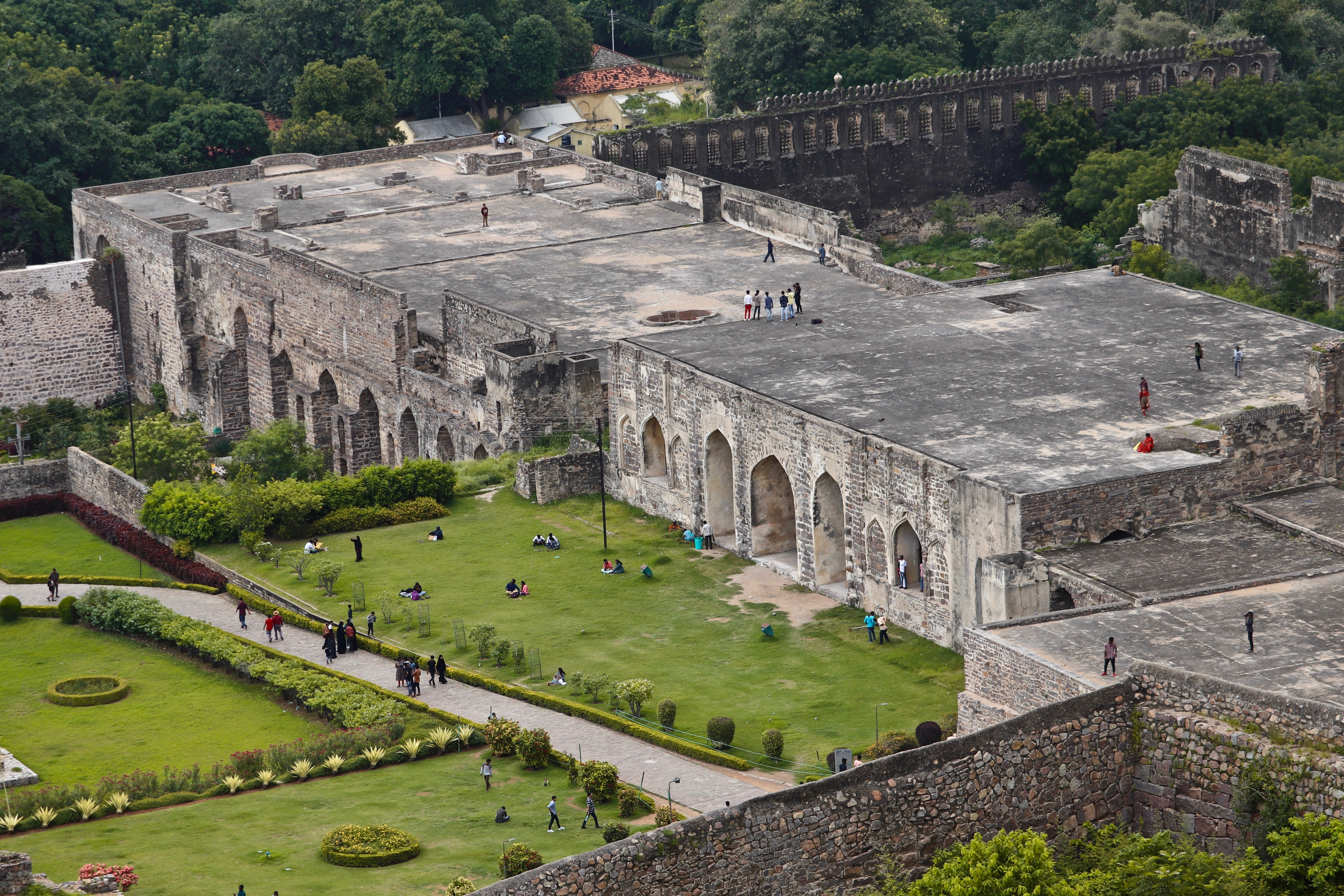
Bhagmathi Palace

- Falaknuma Palace - royal residence, Hyderabad
- King Kothi Palace, Palace of VII Nizam, Osman Ali Khan - Hyderabad
- Purani Haveli, Former seat of the Nizam of Hyderabad - Hyderabad
- Chowmahalla Palace - Hyderabad
- Paigah Palace - Hyderabad
- Kollapur Palace - Nagarkurnool
- Hill Fort Palace - Hyderabad
- Basheer Bagh Palace - Hyderabad
- Bella Vista, Hyderabad - Hyderabad
- Sardar Mahal - Hyderabad
- Chiraan Fort Palace - Hyderabad
- Errum Manzil - Hyderabad
- British Residency, Hyderabad - Hyderabad
- Asman Garh Palace - Hyderabad
- Jubilee Hall - Hyderabad
- Basheer Bagh Palace - Hyderabad
- Bhagmathi Palace - Golconda, Hyderabad
- Dewan Devdi - Hyderabad
- Jahnuma Palace - Hyderabad
- Khursheed Jah Devdi - Hyderabad
- Devdi Iqbal ud-Dowla - Hyderabad
- Fareed nawaz Jung Devdi - Hyderabad
- Chandra Bhavan Palace (Rai Rayan Devdi) - Hyderabad
- Rangeen Mahal - Golconda, Hyderabad
- Rani Mahal - Golconda, Hyderabad
- Wanaparthy Palace - Wanaparthy
- Vikhar Manzil - Hyderabad
- Mahbub Mansion - Hyderabad
- Saroornagar Palace - Hyderabad
- Gyan Bagh Palace - Hyderabad
- Mushk Mahal - Hyderabad

== Tripura ==
- Ujjayanta Palace, former royal palace of Tripura - West Tripura
- Pushbanta Palace - West Tripura
- Neermahal - Sipahijala

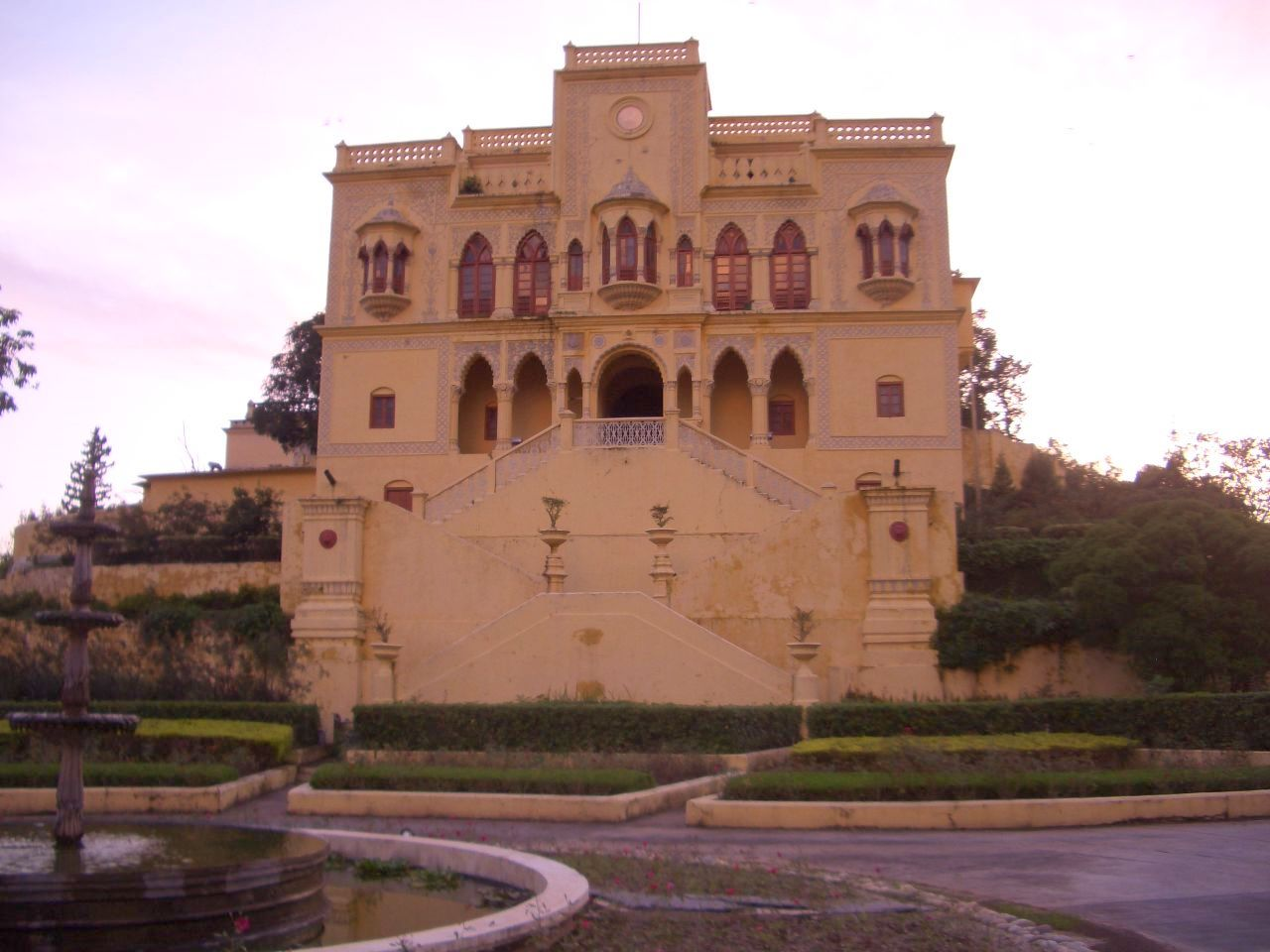
Viceregal Palace, Ananda in the Himalay

== Uttarakhand ==
- Viceregal Palace - Tehri Garhwal
- Malla Mahal - Almora
- Rang Mahal of Landhaura - Roorkee, Haridwar
- Ram Mahal - Timli, Dehradun
- Raj Bhavan - Nainital

== Uttar Pradesh ==
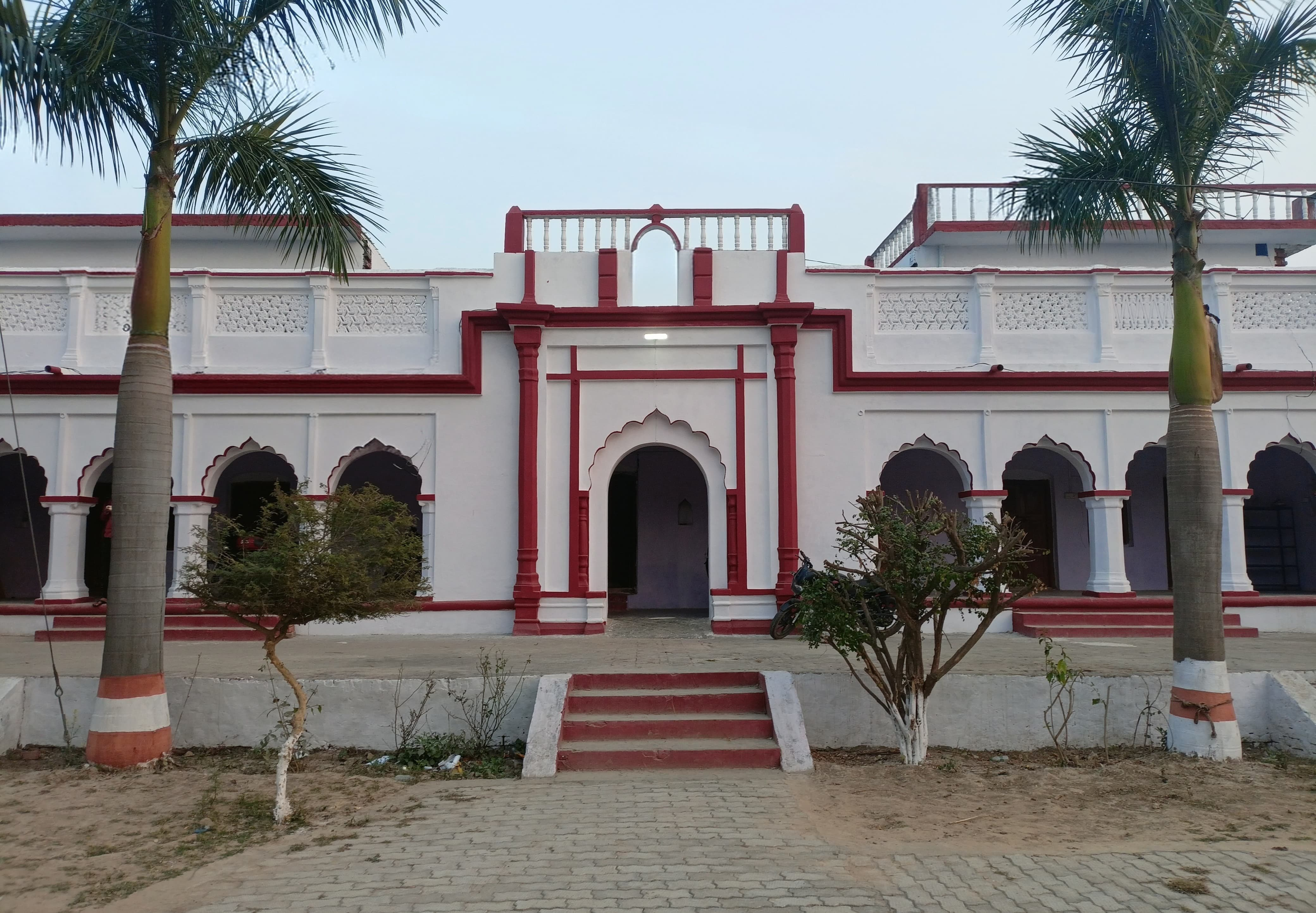
Kohra Palace

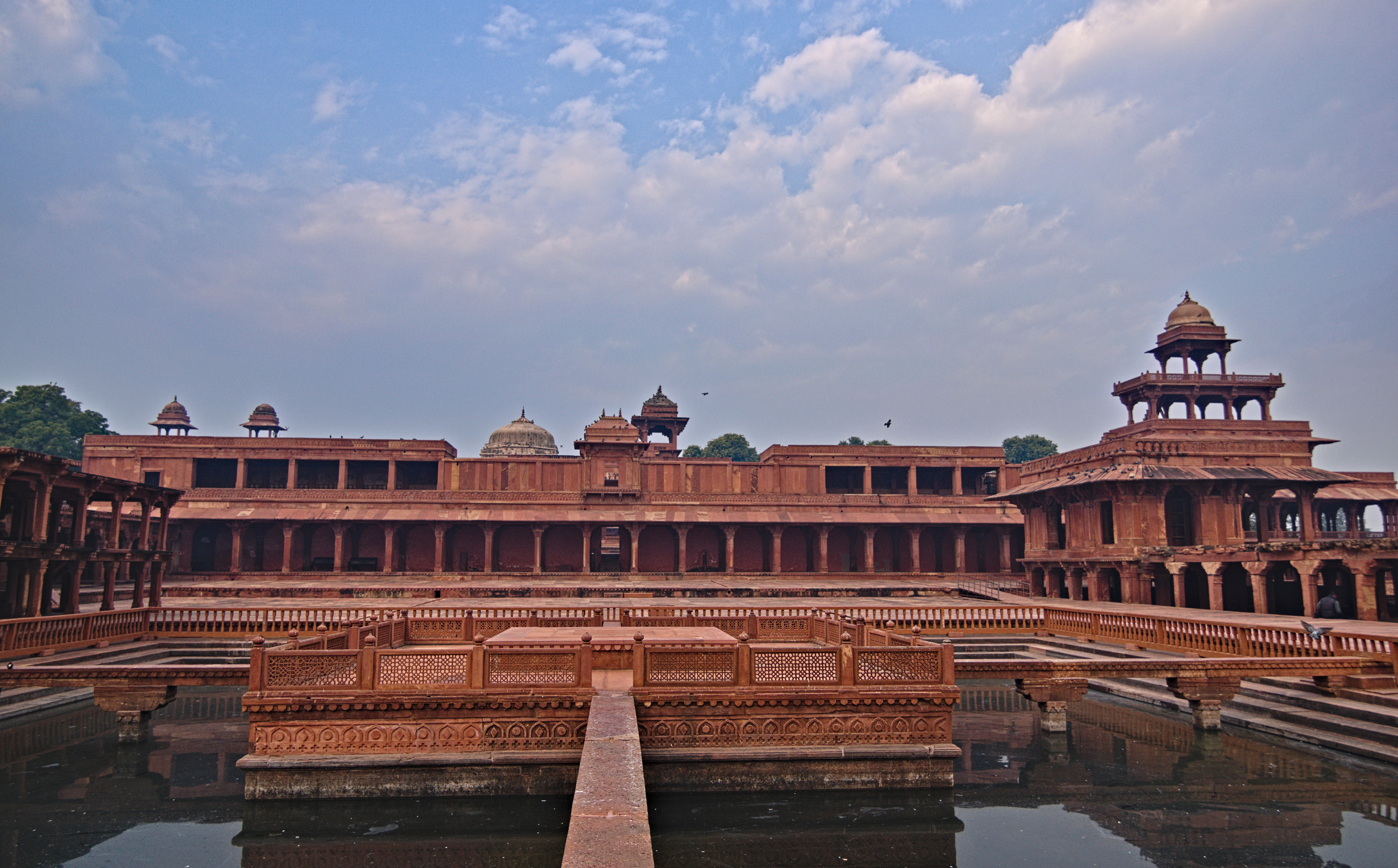
Panch Mahal

- Kohra Palace, Seat of the Babu of Kohra (estate) - Amethi
- Sarosi Palace, Seat of the Chaudhri of Sarosi estate - Unnao
- Ramnagar Fort, Palace of Kashinaresh, Bhumihar king of Benaras state - Varanasi
- Khasbagh Palace, Palace of the Maharaja of Rampur - Rampur
- Panch Mahal - Agra
- Jodha Bai Mahal - Agra
- Birbal's Palace - Agra
- Mustafa Castle - Meerut
- Mubarak Manzil - Agra
- Jahangiri Mahal - Agra
- Shah Jahani Mahal - Agra
- Rani Mahal - Jhansi
- Chattar Manzil - Lucknow
- Jahangirabad Palace - Lucknow
- Surat Bhawan Palace (Khairigarh Palace) - Lakhimpur Kheri
- Qaisar Bagh - Lucknow
- Palace of Darbhanga Ghat -Varanasi
- Mahmudabad Fort - Mahmudabad, India, Sitapur
- Senapati palace - Mahoba
- Alambagh Palace - Lucknow
- Makrahi Palace - Ambedkar Nagar
- Mahesh Vilas Palace - Raebareli
- Vijayanagaram palace - Varanasi

== West Bengal ==
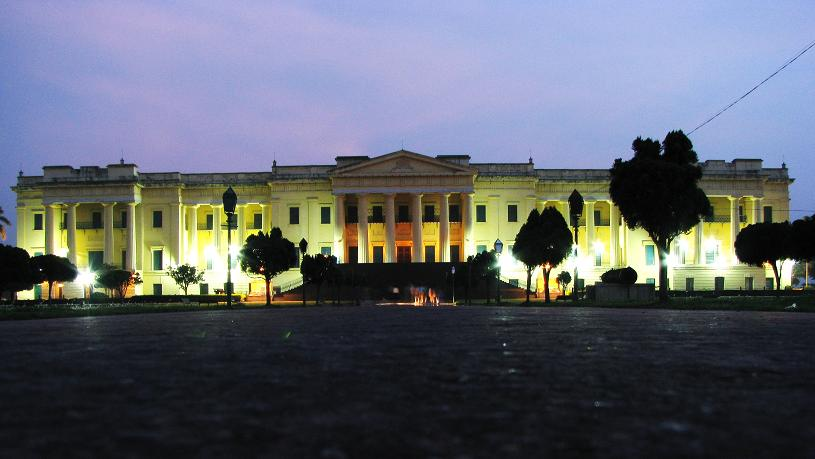
Hazarduari Palace

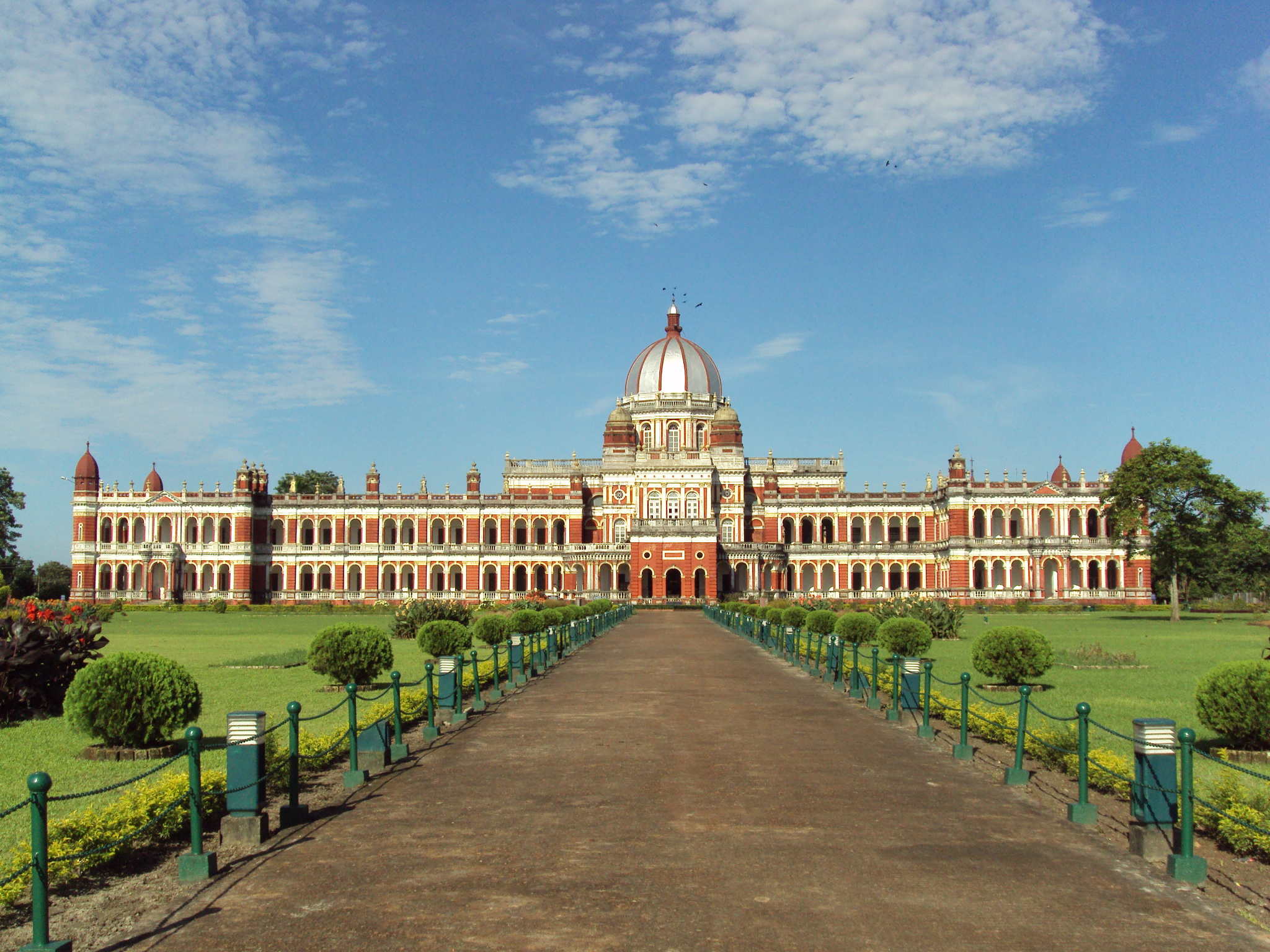
Cooch Behar Palace

- Bhutan House - royal residence of the Dorji family, Kalimpong
- Cooch Behar Palace - former royal residence, Cooch Behar
- Andul rajbari, royal residence of the Andul Dutta Chaudhury Family Kayastha family - Andul, Howrah
- Hazarduari Palace - former royal residence, Murshidabad
- Jhargram Palace, former royal residence and heritage hotel - Jhargram
- Marble Palace - former residence of Raja Rajendra Mullick, Kolkata
- Wasif Manzil - former royal residence, Murshidabad
- Nashipur Rajbari - Murshidabad
- Shobhabazar Rajbari - Kolkata
- Mallick Bari (Midnapore) - Paschim Medinipur
- Bawali Rajbari - Kolkata
- Moynaghar Rajbari - Purba Medinipur
- Mahishadal Rajbari - Purba Medinipur
- Kathgola Palace - Murshidabad
- Dupleix Palace - Hooghly
- Amadpur Chaudhuri Zamindar Rajbari - Purba Bardhaman
- Itachuna Rajbari - Hooghly
- Palace of Janbazar - Kolkata
- Basu Bati - Kolkata
- Kalikapur Rajbari - Purba Burdhaman
- Sovabazar Rajbari - Kolkata
- Uttarpara Palace - Hoogly
- Narajole Rajbari - Paschim Medinipur
- Hawa Mahal - Paschim Medinipur
- Cossimbazar Palace of the Roys - Murshidabad
- Sripur Palace - Cossimbazar, Murshidabad
- Gain Castle - Dhanyakuria, North 24 Parganas
- Kashipur Rajbari - Purulia

== See also ==
- List of forts in India
