= Merry Lodge Palace =

Palace in Thrissur, India

Merry Lodge Palace is a palace situated in the city of Thrissur, India. It was the palace and summer resort of the abdicated Maharaja of Cochin Rama Varma XV. The palace was the venue of the meeting between Mahatma Gandhi and Rama Varma XV in 1925. In 1947, it was converted to Sree Kerala Varma College. The palace and the compound cover 22 acres (8.9 ha).
