= Nagholkothi =

Palace in India

Naghol kothi is a palace (Kothi) located in Patna City, India. This building was built in the British Raj, by a mughal architect and is splendid example of Mughal architecture. This building is surrounded by a beautiful garden. Owned initially by Raja Babu, this building was later sold to Mr. Akhtar Hussain.
