= Sailashree Palace =

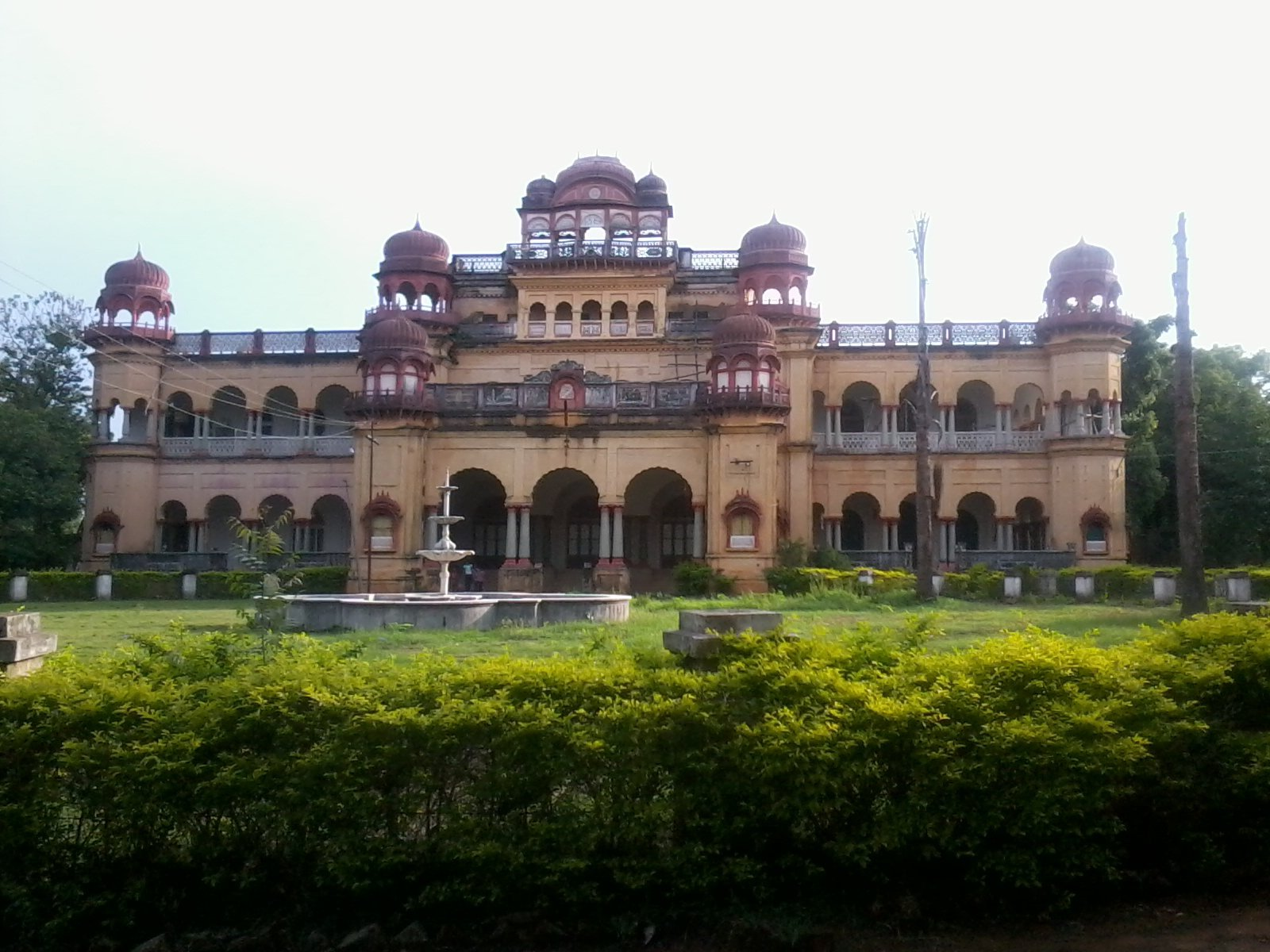
- Sailashree Palace, Balangir

- Location in Odisha, India

General information
- Location: Balangir, India
- Coordinates: 20.72°N 83.48°E

Sailashree Palace, also known as the Balangir Palace, is a Palace Complex situated in the Balangir city in the Odisha state of India. In ancient times when Odisha was called the province of Kalinga, many royal palaces were built for the kings of the districts; this palace is one of the most famous ones. The King Rajendra Narayan Singh lived and ruled in this palace.

== Accessibility ==
The Palace is located 3.5 kilometres away from the Balagir railway station. The Nuagaon Airport in Nuagaon is the nearest airport from Balangir city.
