= Narhan Estate =

Medieval dynasty and later a zamindari estate of Bhumihar during the British Raj

Narhan Raj Estate
- 17th Century–1947
- Capital: Narhan
- Religion: Hinduism
- Historical era: Middle Ages
  - Established: 17th Century
  - Disestablished: 1947

The Narhan Estate, also known as Narhan Raj, was a medieval dynasty and later a zamindari (estate) during the British Raj, located in present-day Bihar.

The estate was ruled by the Bhumihar community, a dominant landowning group in Bihar known for their administrative and military influence. Within the Bhumihars, the rulers of Narhan Estate belonged to the Dronwar clan, a prominent sub-group with historical significance. Furthermore, the Dronwar rulers of Narhan traced their ancestry to the Vats gotra, a lineage with deep connections to Vedic traditions.

The estate originally belonged to the erstwhile in Samastipur district and extended across the districts of Muzaffarpur and Patna, covering an area of 57,282 acres.

The estate was named after Narhan village, which served as the ancestral seat and administrative center of the ruling family. As a powerful zamindari, Narhan Estate played a vital role in the socio-political landscape of Bihar, influencing regional governance, agrarian policies, and cultural developments. The rulers were known for their patronage of education, religion, and social reforms, leaving a lasting impact on the region's history.

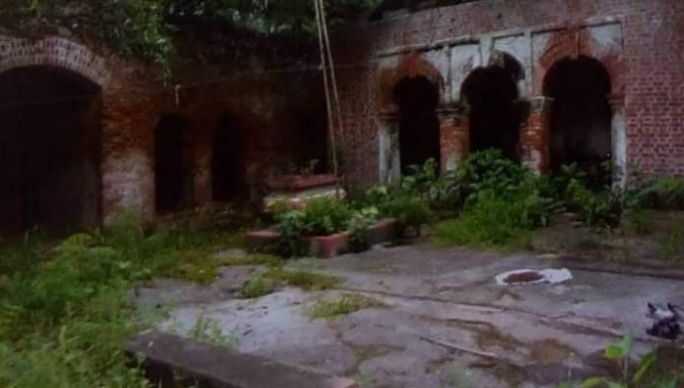
Ruins of Narhan Palace

== See also ==
- Zamindars of Bihar
