= Ramu Ramdev =

Indian artist

Ramu Ramdev (born 7 May 1969) is an artist who specialises in the traditional techniques and styles of north Indian painting. He has worked over thirty years to preserve and promote the Indian art of the miniature, teaching techniques to young artists, leading summer camps annually at the City Palace, Jaipur and organising displays in India and abroad. Examples of his work are in the British Museum and other collections. In recognition of his services, Ramu Ramdev received the National Award for Master Craftspersons & Weavers in 2010.

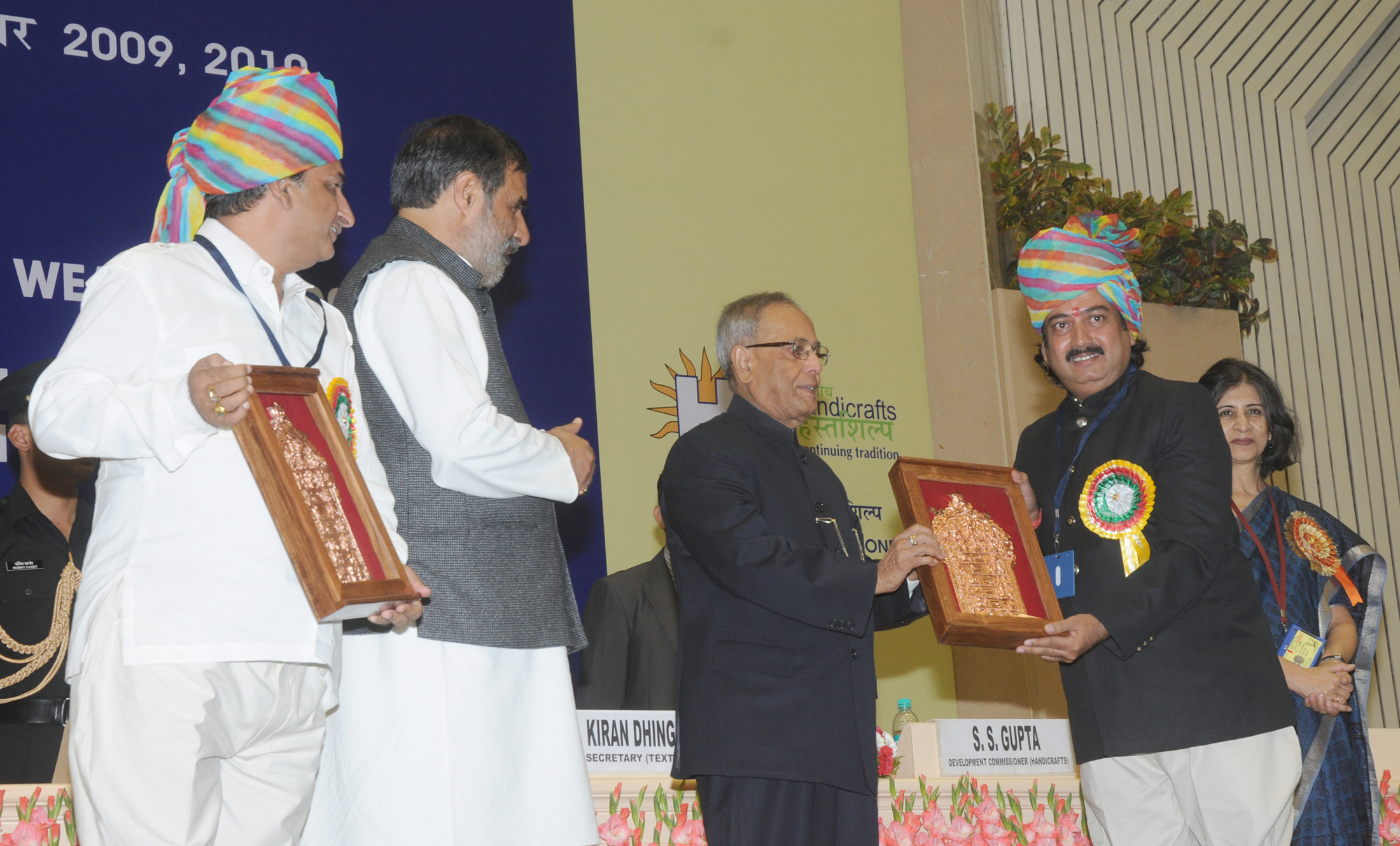
Pranab Mukherjee presenting the National Award for Master Craftspersons & Weavers 2010 to Shri Gobind Ramdev and Shri Ramu Ramdev, at the presentation of National Awards
