= Rambagh Palace, Jaipur =

Coordinates: 26.8981°N 75.8081°E

Rambagh Palace
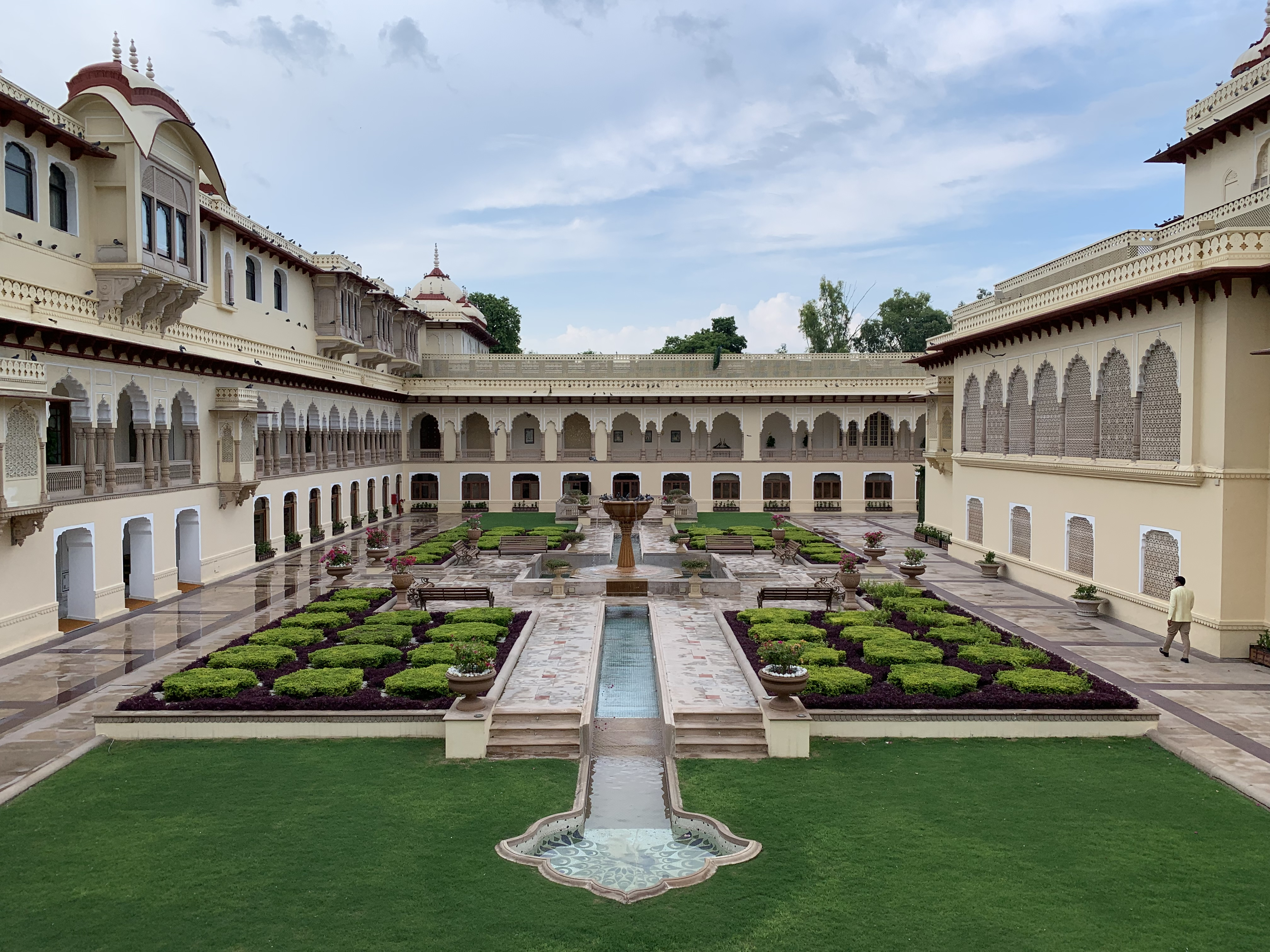
- Rambagh Palace hotel's inner courtyard
- Interactive map of the Rambagh Palace area

General information
- Architectural style: Indo-Saracenic architecture
- Location: Jaipur, India

Design and construction
- Architect: Sir Samuel Swinton Jacob

The Rambagh Palace in Jaipur, Rajasthan is the former residence of the maharaja of Jaipur located 5 miles (8.0 km) outside the walls of the city of Jaipur on Bhawani Singh Road. It was constructed in 1835, and was originally built as a garden retreat for a queen's handmaiden, later serving as a royal guesthouse and hunting lodge. In the early 20th century the building was expanded into a grand palace which became the principal residence of Jaipur's ruler, Maharaja Sawai Man Singh II. After Indian independence, the Maharaja converted Rambagh Palace into India's first luxury "palace hotel", and in 1972 its management was handed over to Taj Hotels, which preserved its architectural heritage while upgrading it to a five-star hotel. Today Rambagh Palace is often called the "Jewel of Jaipur". It is noted for its Indo-Saracenic architecture ornate gardens, and rich connections to Jaipur's royal history.

== History ==
The Rambagh Palace was established in 1835 as a modest country house in the Rambagh Gardens, south of the old city of Jaipur. The first building on the site was a garden house built in 1835 for the wet nurse of Prince Ram Singh II. It was later expanded by Maharaja Sawai Ram Singh II for Kesar Badaran, his maid and attendant of the maharaja's queen. In those early years it was a simple pavilion amid the forested outskirts of Jaipur. By the late 19th century it had been converted into a royal hunting lodge and guesthouse, where royal relatives and visitors could stay while hunting in the surrounding countryside.

In the early 20th century, the lodge was transformed into a full-fledged palace. Under the ruling family of Jaipur, the structure was greatly enlarged in an Indo-Saracenic style blending Rajput and Mughal motifs. By 1925, Rambagh Palace had become the principal residence of Maharaja Sawai Man Singh II (ruled 1922–1970). The maharaja lived there with his wife, Maharani Gayatri Devi, and it became the venue for royal events, receptions and ceremonies. Dignitaries on official state business at Rambagh used to stay here. It was expanded into a palace to the designs of Sir Samuel Swinton Jacob. Maharajah Sawai Man Singh II made Rambagh his principal residence and added a number of royal suites. In 1931 a lavish coronation ceremony was held here when Sawai Man Singh II was formally crowned. Toyal weddings, Royal Polo matches, and balls & dinners were hosted here.

After India's independence in 1947 and the integration of the princely states, the role of the maharaja and his palaces changed. In the 1950s Sawai Man Singh II elected to open Rambagh Palace to the public by converting it into a hotel. He refitted the former royal chambers and suites for guests, creating what became known as the first luxury palace hotel in India.

On 2 May 1972, management of Rambagh Palace was transferred to Taj Hotels. Taj then set about restoring and modernizing the property while respecting its historic character. They reduced the total room count and upgraded plumbing, air-conditioning and other amenities. Throughout the 1970s and 1980s the hotel changed hands within the Taj group, but has always remained a flagship heritage hotel. In the late 20th and early 21st century Rambagh Palace has been widely recognized as a top-tier heritage hotel, and it has hosted numerous statesmen and celebrities.

== Architecture ==
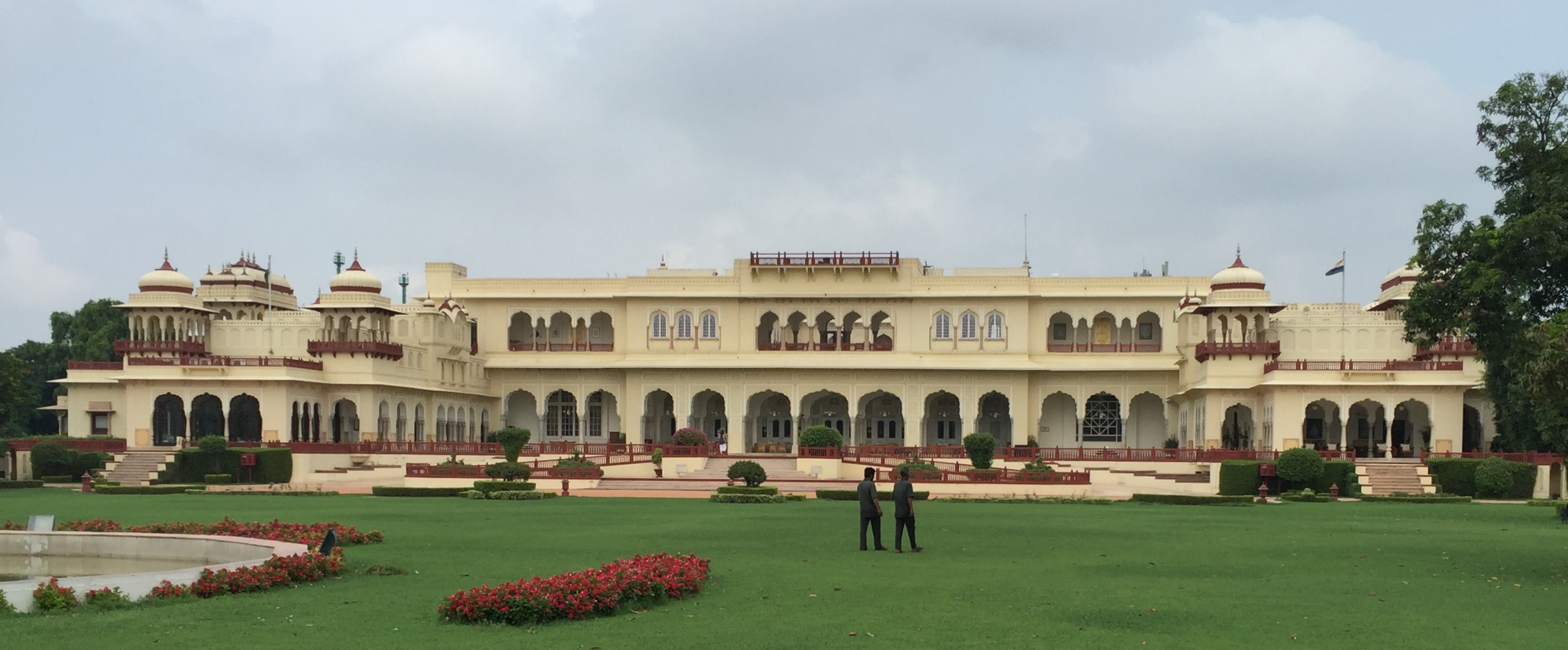
Rambagh Palace view from the garden

The architecture of Rambagh Palace blends traditional Rajasthani and Mughal elements with Indo-Saracenic revival style. The structure is built primarily of pale pink sandstone with marble detailing. The palace spans over 47 acres of gardens, with a symmetrical layout centered on one or more open courtyards. Its facades feature ornate domes (chhatris), carved stone balconies, jali (lattice) screens, and bracketed eaves in the Rajputana manner. Arched verandahs with scalloped openings and columns create shaded colonnades around the courtyards. Tall spires and cupolas punctuate the roofline, and decorative parapets and finials accentuate the geometry of the palace. The overall effect is grandeur and monumentality, in keeping with the British-era "Raj-era" palatial style.

Inside, the palace retains many richly decorated historic spaces. Much of the original interior detailing survives or has been painstakingly recreated. Elaborately hand-painted ceilings and stucco cornices adorn key chambers. Venetian glass chandeliers and art glass windows provide focal elegance. For example, the lobby area features glass-bevelled arched windows, marble pillars, and delicate decorative cornices.

The surrounding gardens and grounds are an integral part of the palace's design. Laid out in Mughal formal patterns, there are geometric flowerbeds, tree-lined promenades and reflecting pools radiating from the courtyard axes. Water channels, fountains and lotus ponds animate the gardens, while bougainvillea plantings provide color. Peacocks, long kept by the royals, still roam freely in the lawns and shaded groves. The effect is of an expansive oasis, a feature emphasized by both the Taj management and heritage tourism promoters. As the Taj brochure notes, Rambagh's setting of "beautiful gardens" and "majestic" corridors echo the traditions of Jaipur's royal residence.

== Cultural Relevance ==
Rambagh Palace holds a significant place in Jaipur's royal heritage and in modern Rajasthan's tourism. As the seat of the maharaja of Jaipur, it was central to the city's social and ceremonial life from the 1930s onward. The palace witnessed many historical events: for instance, the 1931 coronation of Maharaja Sawai Man Singh II took place on its grounds. In the early years of independent India, the palace hosted the new nation's leaders – according to some accounts India's first president Dr. Rajendra Prasad was entertained here in 1950. Over decades it has often been used for royal weddings, diplomatic receptions, and elite social events, symbolizing the enduring legacy of Rajput royal customs in Jaipur. Even today, the hotel maintains a reputation for "the finest traditions of Rajput hospitality".

The palace has also become a symbol of the grandeur of Jaipur's royal past. Because of this, popular culture has occasionally featured Rambagh as a location. For example, the Bollywood film Lamhe (1991) used parts of the palace to depict the opulent haveli of the hero (Anil Kapoor's character). Likewise, the movie Bajirao Mastani (2015) shot some palace scenes on location, taking advantage of Rambagh's colorful architecture.

Notable guests besides royals have included heads of state and global celebrities. Travel publications note that Lord Louis Mountbatten (the last Viceroy of India) and British royalty have stayed here.

== See also ==
- City Palace, Jaipur
- Raj Mahal
