= Shiv Vilas Palace =

Building in Indore, Madhya Pradesh, India

- Shiv Vilas palace in the late 19th century
- Alternative names: New Palace

General information
- Architectural style: Neoclassical architecture
- Location: Indore, Madhya Pradesh, India
- Construction started: 1890
- Completed: 1894

Shiv Vilas Palace, also known as the New palace, is a palace in Indore, built by Maharaja Shivajirao Holkar of the Holkar dynasty and served as the official residence of the Holkars from 1894 to 1920. This palace was built beside their old residence, the Rajwada.

Shiv Vilas Palace, late 19th century, marriage scene

Location

The construction was started in 1890 and exhibits Neoclassical architecture. The starting year of construction (1890) coincided with the birth of Maharaja Shivajirao's son and successor, Tukojirao Holkar III. It currently houses a hospital and a few offices. The Shiv Vilas Palace was constructed while the construction of the Lalbagh Palace was in progress and upon its completion, the official residence was shifted to it. Recently, city tours have started to include the palace in their itineraries.
