= NVDA =

NVDA may refer to:

- Non-violent direct action
- NonVisual Desktop Access, an open source screen reader software for Windows
- Narmada Valley Development Authority, a government organization in Madhya Pradesh, India
- National Volunteer Defence Army, a rebel group in Tibet
- Nvidia (NASDAQ ticker symbol)
