= Narmada Kothi =

Palace in Barwaha, India

Coordinates: 22.22975°N 76.04844°E

The Narmada Kothi is a palace in the Indian municipality of Barwaha.

== History ==
It was constructed by the Maharaja Holkar of Indore State (of the Marathas), as a retreat and used by him and his family to enjoy their holidays and picnics in pre-independent British India. The palace was built in European style. The Hindi/Punjabi language word "Kothi" means a luxurious home or mansion built by the wealthy higher or royal class.

After independence of India from Britain, this mansion was taken over by the state government of Madhya Pradesh. The main floor was converted into the offices of Narmada River Valley Development Project which planned to use the waters of the River Narmada for irrigation and hydroelectric power generation through construction of dams and canals. The top floor was divided equally into the residential quarters of the superintendent engineer and chief engineer of the project. In its heyday, the palace had beautiful gardens around it with a fountain and had office staff, servants, gardeners and drivers working in its compound. Today it continues to house the state government offices of the Narmada (River) Valley Development Authority, Circle Number 8.

The Narmada Kothi was originally painted yellow with white highlights and now it is painted in a light maroon colour with white highlights but its interior still remains predominantly yellow with white highlights.

== Location ==
It is constructed on a fortified embankment just above the high flood level mark on the banks of the Narmada River in Barwaha, in the modern day state of Madhya Pradesh. It is situated just east of the Khandwa - Indore Road Bridge over the Narmada River on the National Highway 27.

== See also ==
- Rajwada, main palace of Indore
- Lalbagh Palace
- Manik Bagh
- Yeshwant Club, Indore
- New Palace, Kolhapur of the Bhonsle Chhatrapatis
- Laxmi Vilas Palace, Vadodara of the Gaekwads
- Jai Vilas Palace, Gwalior of the Scindias
- Shaniwar Wada, Pune of the Peshwas
- Thanjavur Maratha palace of the Bhonsles
- Narmada Valley Development Authority, State Government of Madhya Pradesh, India.
