= Maharaja Fateh Singh Museum =

Museum in India

Coordinates: 22.2921°N 73.1938°E

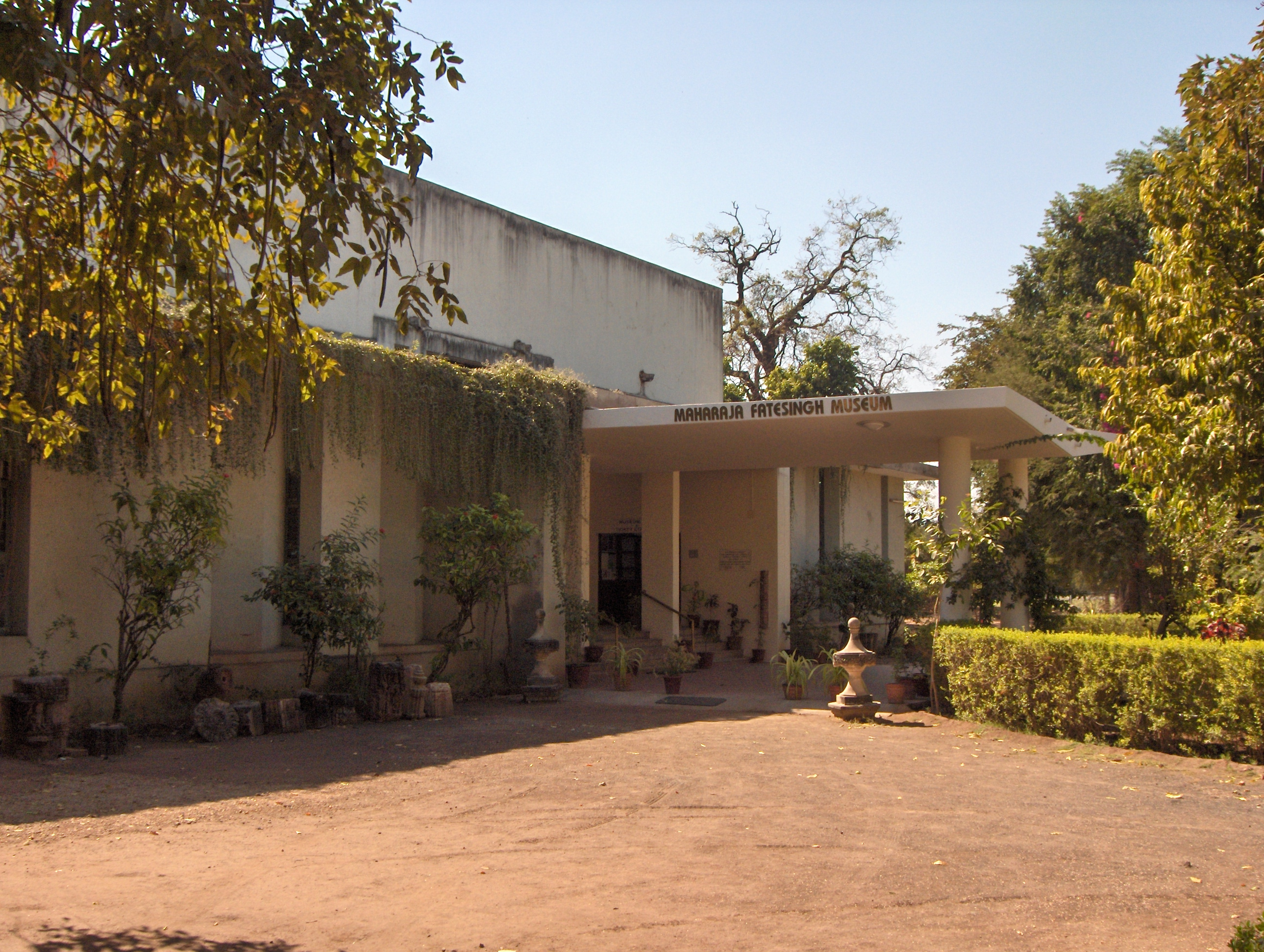
- Gateway
- Location: Vadodara, India
- Website: wayanadmuseum.com

Maharaja Fateh Singh Museum is a museum housed within the Maharaja's palace (the Lakshmi Vilas Palace) in Vadodara, India.

== Overview ==
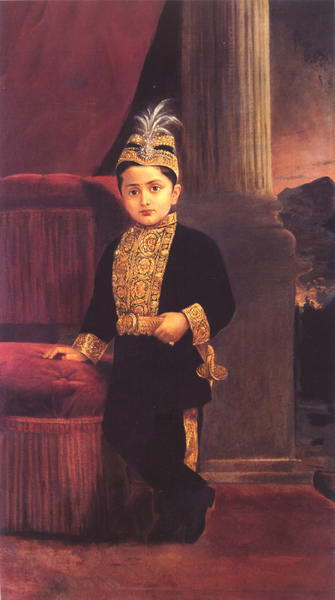
Maharaja fatehsingh rao Gaekwad as child

The building was constructed as a school for the Maharaja's children. Today a large number of works of art belonging to the Maratha royal family are displayed in the museum. The museum contains works of art collected by Maharaja Sir Sayajirao Gaekwad III during his numerous trips out of India. The major works of art in this museum are the paintings by European and Indian artists including a collection of the paintings of Raja Ravi Varma, who was specially commissioned by the then Maharaja of Baroda. The collection includes portraits of the royal family in addition to the paintings based on Hindu mythology for which Raja Ravi Varma was famous.

There is a collection of sculptures in marble and bronze. These include copies of great masters in bronze commissioned by the Maharaja and also originals by renowned artists. One of the artists commissioned by the Maharaja was an Italian artist Fellicci whose works adorn not only the museum but also the Lakshmi Vilas Palace. Some of Fellici's works can be seen on the Public Park ( Sayaji Garden also known as Kamati Baug by the locals).

The museum has an oriental gallery which houses Japanese and Chinese sculptures and other works collected by the Maharaja on his visits to these countries.
