= Lakshmi Vilas Palace, Vadodara =

Palace in Gujarat, India

Coordinates: 22.2939°N 73.1914°E

Lakshmi Vilas Palace
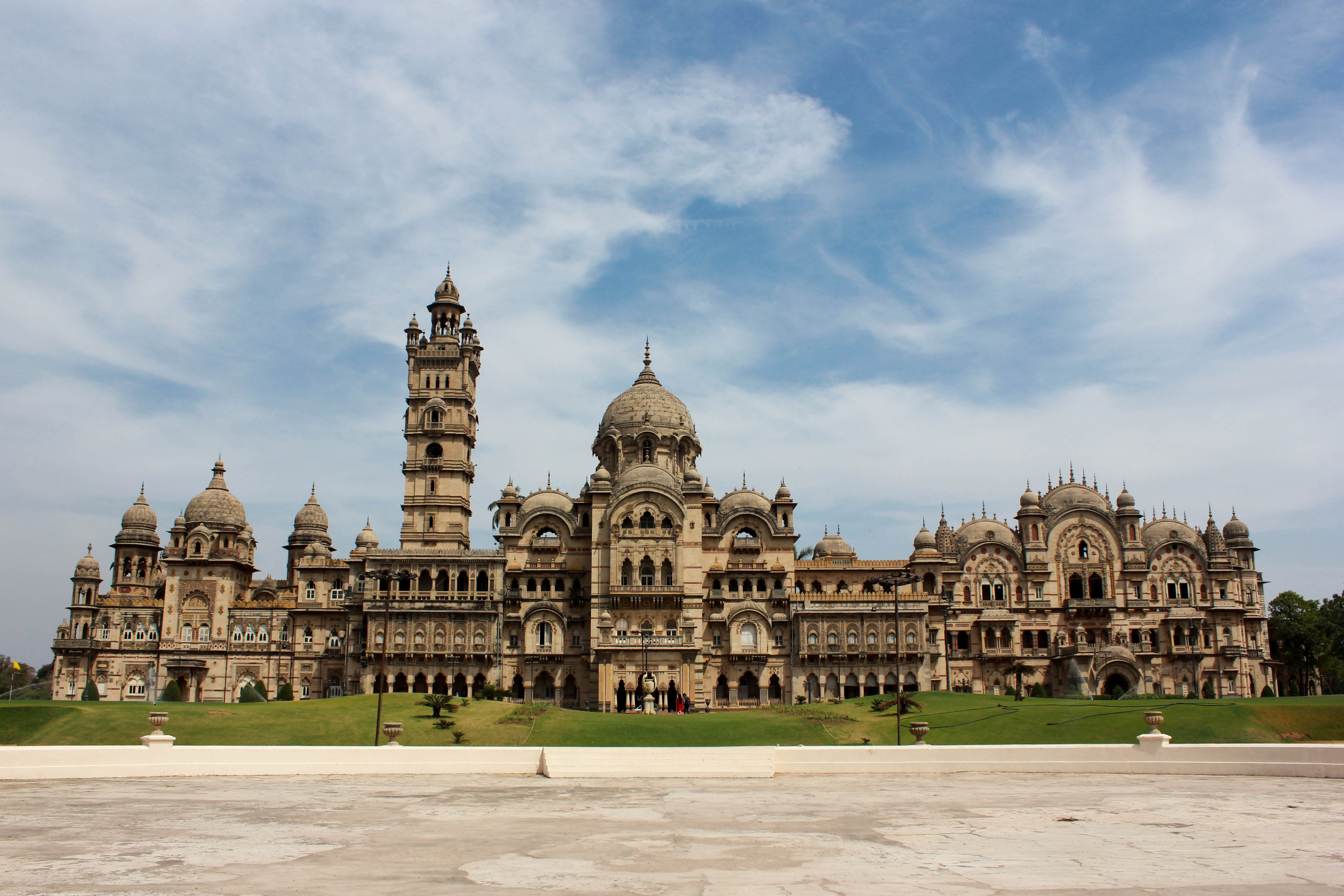
- Panoramic view of the palace
- Interactive map of the Lakshmi Vilas Palace area

General information
- Architectural style: Indo-Saracenic
- Location: Vadodara, India
- Construction started: 1878
- Completed: 1890
- Cost: Rs. 6 million

Design and construction
- Architects: Robert Chisholm, Charles Mant

Website
- gaekwarenterprise.com

Lakshmi Vilas Palace (Gujarati: લક્ષ્મી વિલાસ મહેલ) is a historic palace and royal residence located in Vadodara, Gujarat, India. The palace was commissioned in 1878 by Sayajirao Gaekwad III, the ruler of Baroda State, and constructed in 1890 by British architects Charles Mant and Robert Chisholm. The royal family lived in the Maharaja Palace and the Nazarbaug Palace, before taking up residence in the Lakshmi Villas Palace. Named after Sayajirao's first wife Lakshmibai, it served as the royal residence of the Gaekwad dynasty, a Maratha family which ruled the princely state of Baroda until its accession to the Dominion of India in 1947. With a complex spanning over 500 acres, the palace is the world's largest private residence, and is a prominent example of Indo-Saracenic architecture, combining elements from Indo-Islamic and Renaissance architectural styles.

Constructed at a cost of Rs. 6 million, the palace featured several technologically advanced amenities at the time of its completion, including indoor elevators and a telephone exchange. The main palace houses the Maharaja Fateh Singh Museum and serves as the living quarters of Samarjitsinh Gaekwad, the current ceremonial head of the Gaekwad dynasty. In addition to the palace, the overall building complex encompasses multiple gardens, the Gaekwad Baroda Golf Club, and the Moti Bagh Stadium. In 2024, Samarjitsinh announced plans to convert the palace into a hotel and tourist resort.

== Overview ==
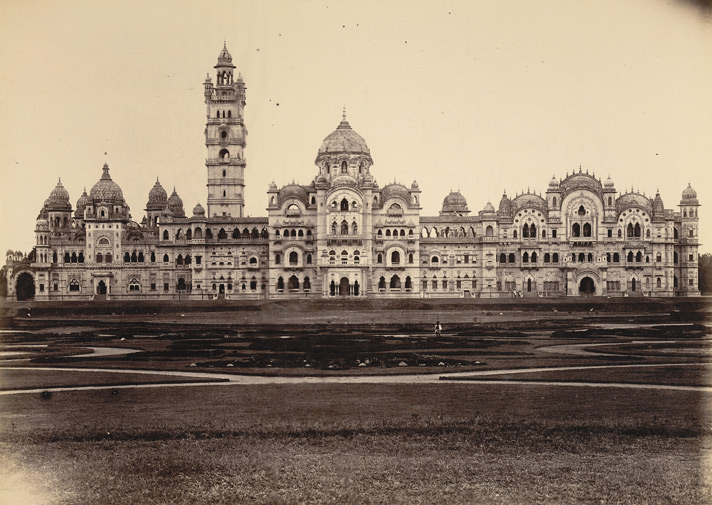
The palace in 1890

At the time of its construction, Lakshmi Vilas boasted several modern amenities, including elevators and a private electrical generator. It remains the residence of the erstwhile Gaekwad royal family. The palace compound covers over 500 acres and houses a number of buildings, including the cricket grounds at the Moti Bagh Stadium and the Maharaja Fateh Singh Museum. The palace has a 5,000 square foot Darbar Hall where royal family hosted concerts and dinners. The latter features the private art collection of the Gaekwads, including several works by Indian painter Raja Ravi Varma.

In the 1930s, Pratap Singh Rao Gaekwad constructed a golf course for the use of his European guests. Pratap Singh's grandson Samarjitsinh renovated the course in the 1990s, and opened it to the public as the Gaekwad Baroda Golf Club.

== Gallery ==
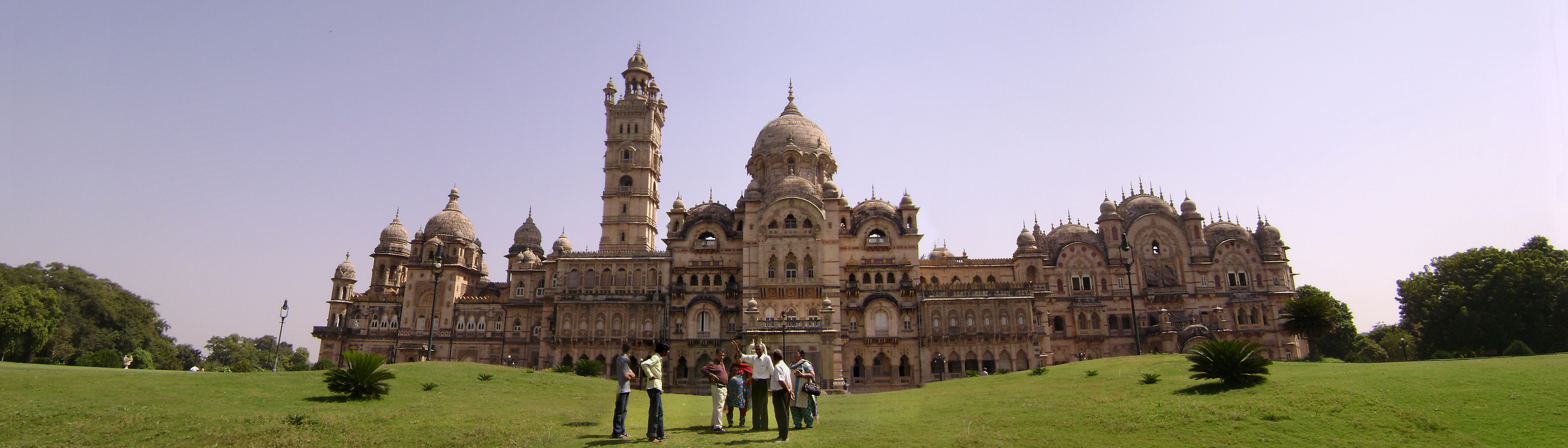
Lakshmi Vilas Palace

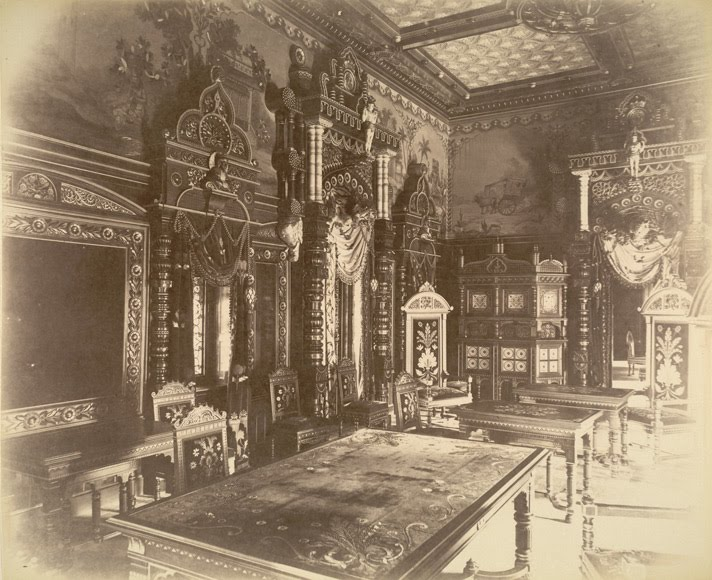
An 1890 photograph of the palace library

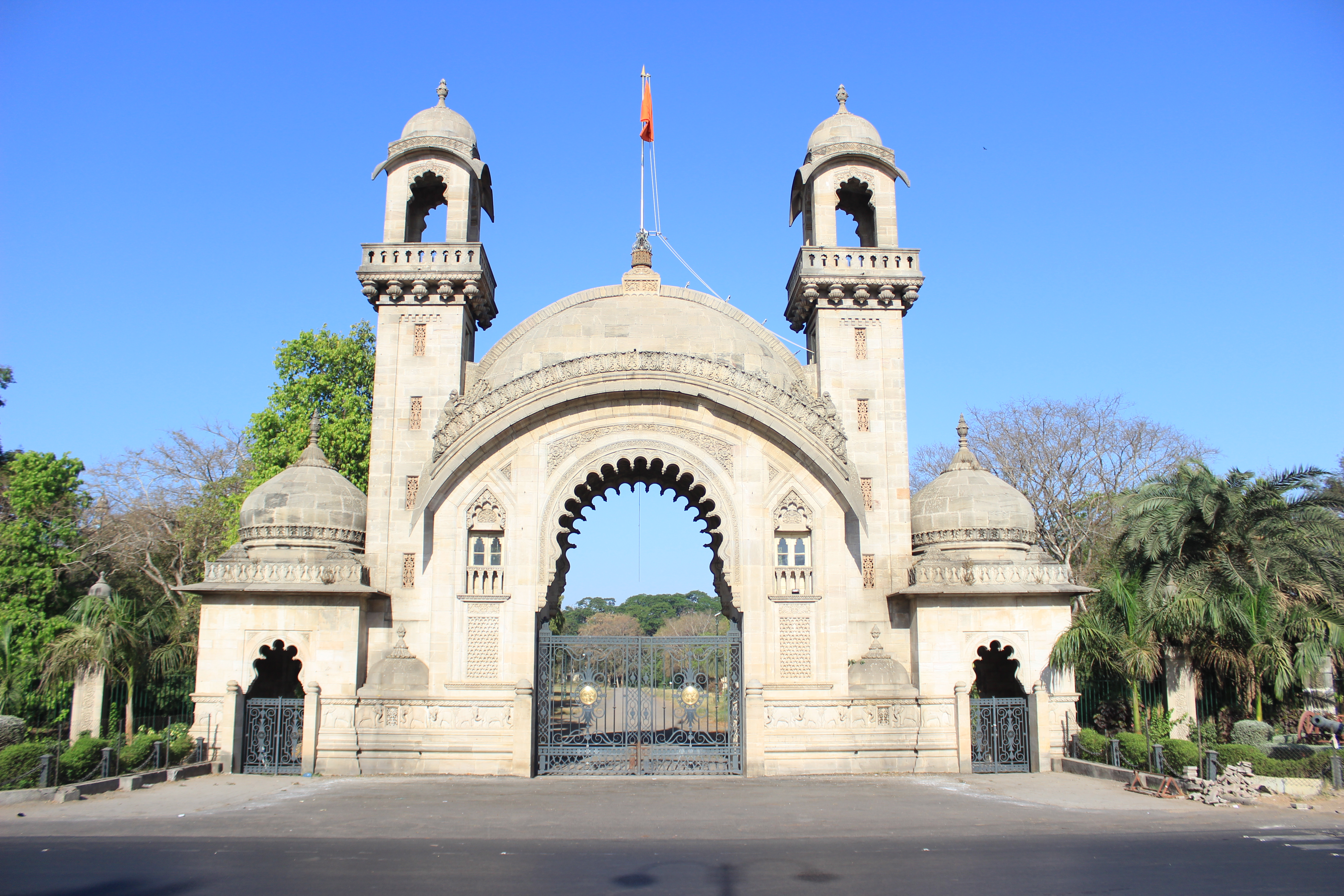
The palace gate

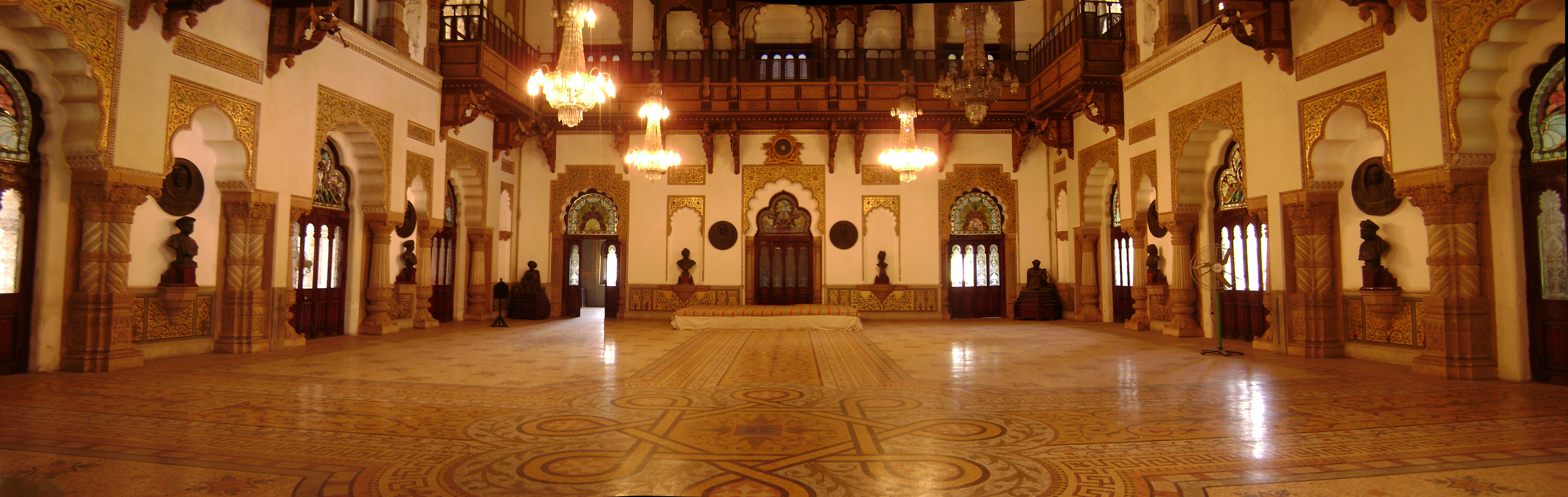
Darbar Hall

== In popular culture ==
Scenes from the following movies were filmed at Lakshmi Vilas Palace:

- Prem Rog in 1982
- Dil Hi Toh Hai in 1993
- Grand Masti in 2013
- Sardaar Gabbar Singh in 2016
- Satyaprem Ki Katha in 2023
- Indian 2 in 2024

== See also ==
- Sayaji Baug, also known as Kamati Baug.
- New Palace, Kolhapur
- Jai Vilas Mahal
- Rajwada
- Shaniwar Wada
- Thanjavur Maratha Palace
- Narmada Kothi
