= Rajwada =

Historic building in Indore, India

Coordinates: 22.7184°N 75.8552°E

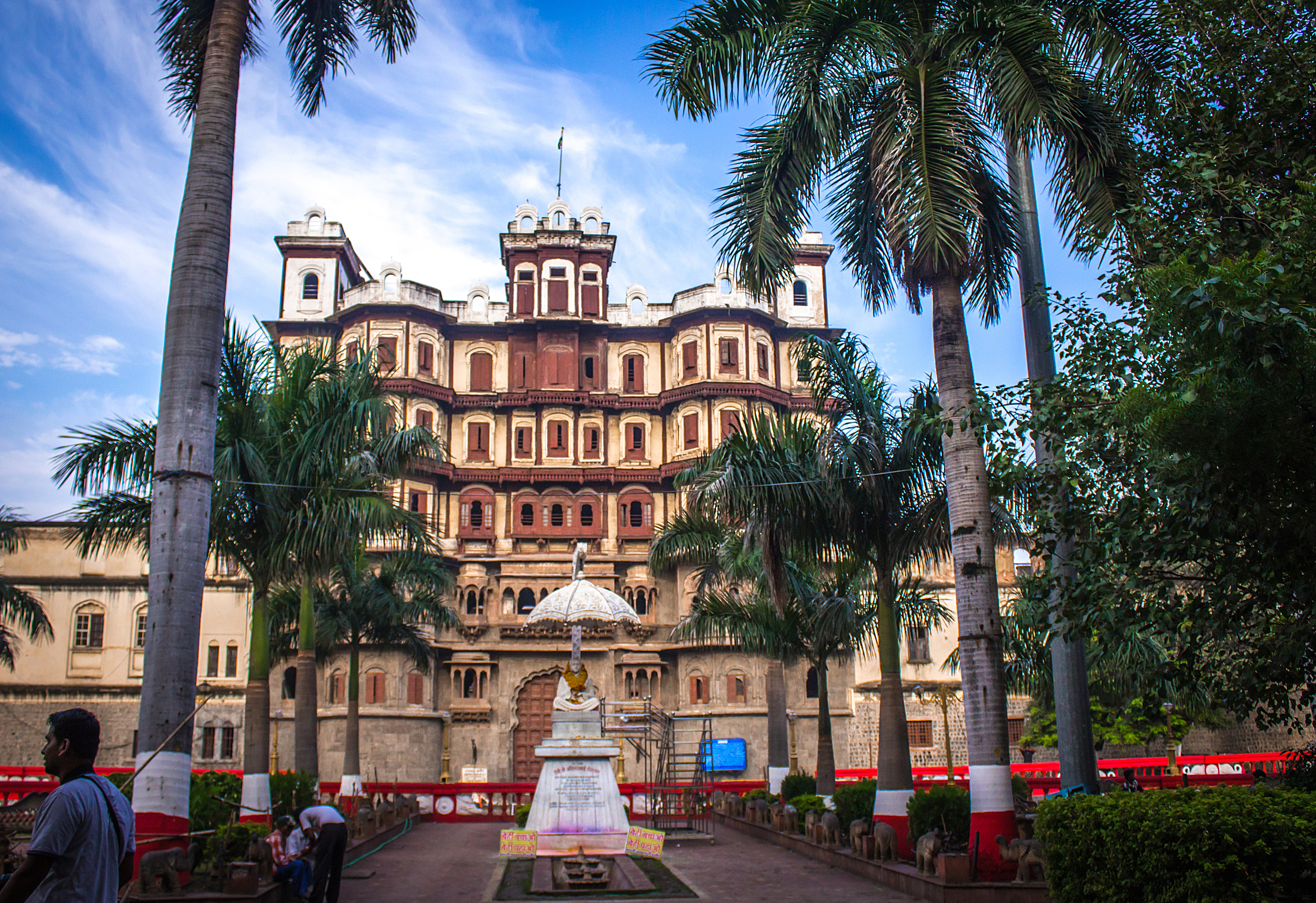
- Main entrance of Rajwada
- Interactive map of the Rajwada area

General information
- Type: Residential royal palace
- Architectural style: Mixed, Maratha style
- Location: Indore, MP, India
- Elevation: 553 m (1,814 ft)
- Construction started: 1747
- Completed: 1766
- Renovated: 4 times, latest being February 2023 By Indore Municipal Corporation
- Owner: Government of Madhya Pradesh (Directorate of Archaeology, Archives and Museums- Grade A protected monument)

Technical details
- Floor count: 7

Rajwada, also known as the Holkar Palace or Old Palace, is a historical palace in Indore that was constructed by the Holkars of the Maratha empire around 2 centuries ago. An example of the architecture of the time, the palace is a 7-story structure that is placed near the Krishnapura Chhatri. The structure has gained the attention of tourists due to its size and age.

The construction of the palace was started by Malhar Rao Holkar, the founder of Holkar Dynasty, in the year 1747 A.D. This structure is placed in Khajuri Bazaar, near the center of the city. The palace has the Shiv Vilas Palace (New Palace) on the right and faces a garden with a statue of Maharani Ahilya Bai Holkar, fountains, and an artificial waterfall.

During the tenure of the Shyama Charan Shukla government, Narayan Prasad Shukla, then Home Minister from Indore, played a key role in securing Rajwada Palace under the ownership of the Government of Madhya Pradesh, preventing its continuation as private property and enabling its protection as a state-owned heritage monument.

== Structure ==
The structure comprises two parts with one near the center of the city and the other in an older section. Both parts utilize Maratha architectural styles. The entrance itself is marked with a large wooden door, supported by iron studs. Inside the entryway, there is a courtyard that consists of a Maratha arched Ganesha hall and a number of balconies, windows, and corridors that link to galleried rooms. The lower three floors are made of stone and the upper floors are made of wood.

The existing building is rectangular with cylindrical bastions at the four corners. It was originally constructed in 1766, and the southern part was later rebuilt in the years 1811–1833 after being damaged by fire. The front bay has forecourt assessed by a large fenestration in the front façade. The Rajwada building is now state property under Archeology, which granted special permission for restoring the old wada (residence) after the main building was damaged during the 1984 riots. This building was restored by H.H Usha Raje Holkar with the assistance of architects Himanshu Dudwadkar and Shreya Bhargava who used the 200-year-old blueprint. Additionally, the same material & finishes were used while adhering to modern seismic structural requirements. The restoration was designed to be identical to its previous state which was constructed with thin bricks in lime mortar with lime plaster, wooden columns with stone bases, rough black basalt flooring, and a brick paved courtyard. The only departure from the original building was a concealed pipe frame for structural stability which was necessary because the building lies in an earthquake prone area. This modification was also required to obtain relevant building permissions.

After renovation of palace by H.H. Usharaje S Holkar in March 2007, another renovation was conducted by Indore Municipal Corporation from 2017 to 2023. Firstly it was scheduled for completion in 2019 but postponed due to budget related issues and COVID-19 pandemic in India. Rajwada was open after almost 6 years in February 2023.

== Gallery ==
Image Gallery

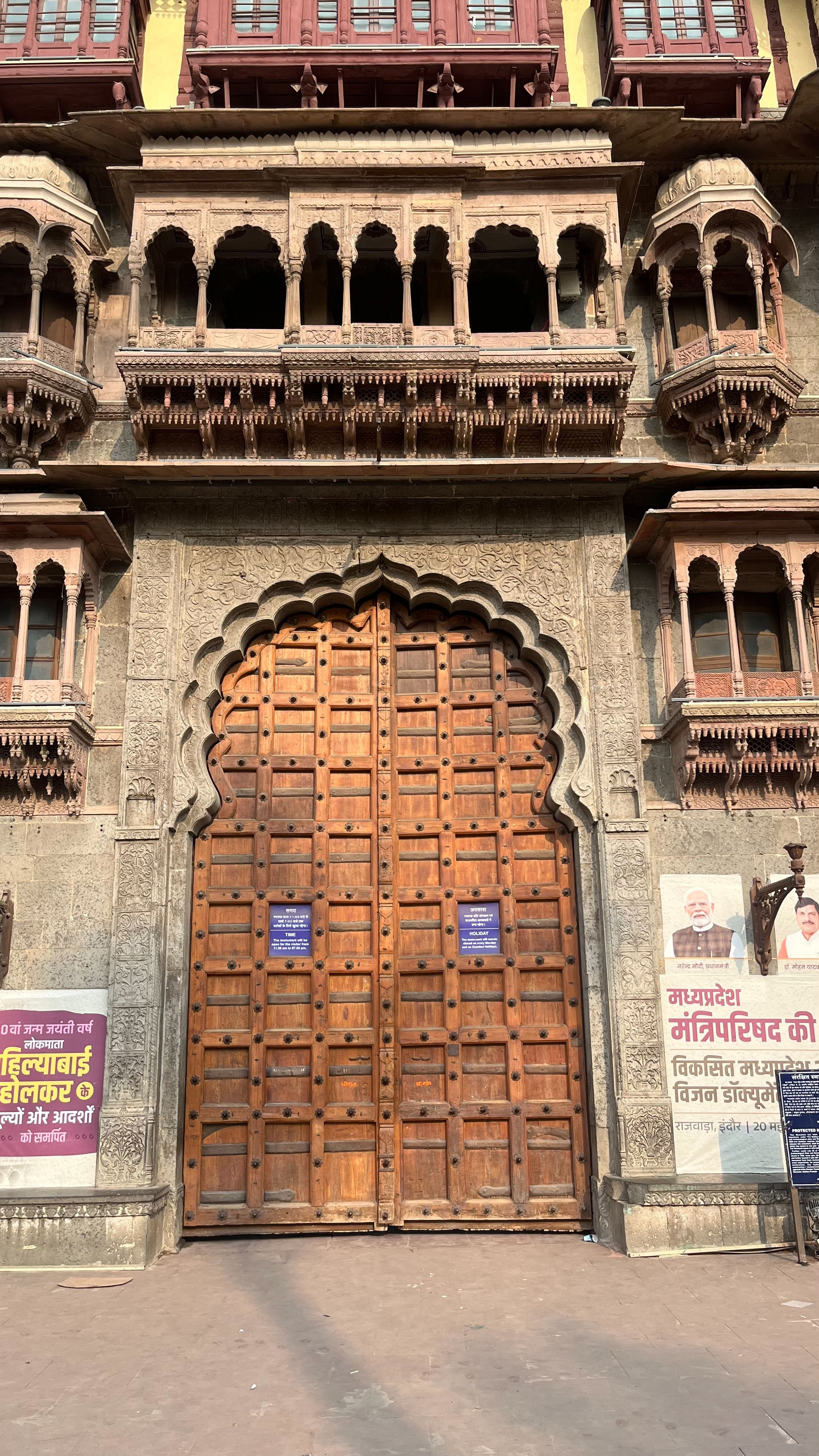
Gate

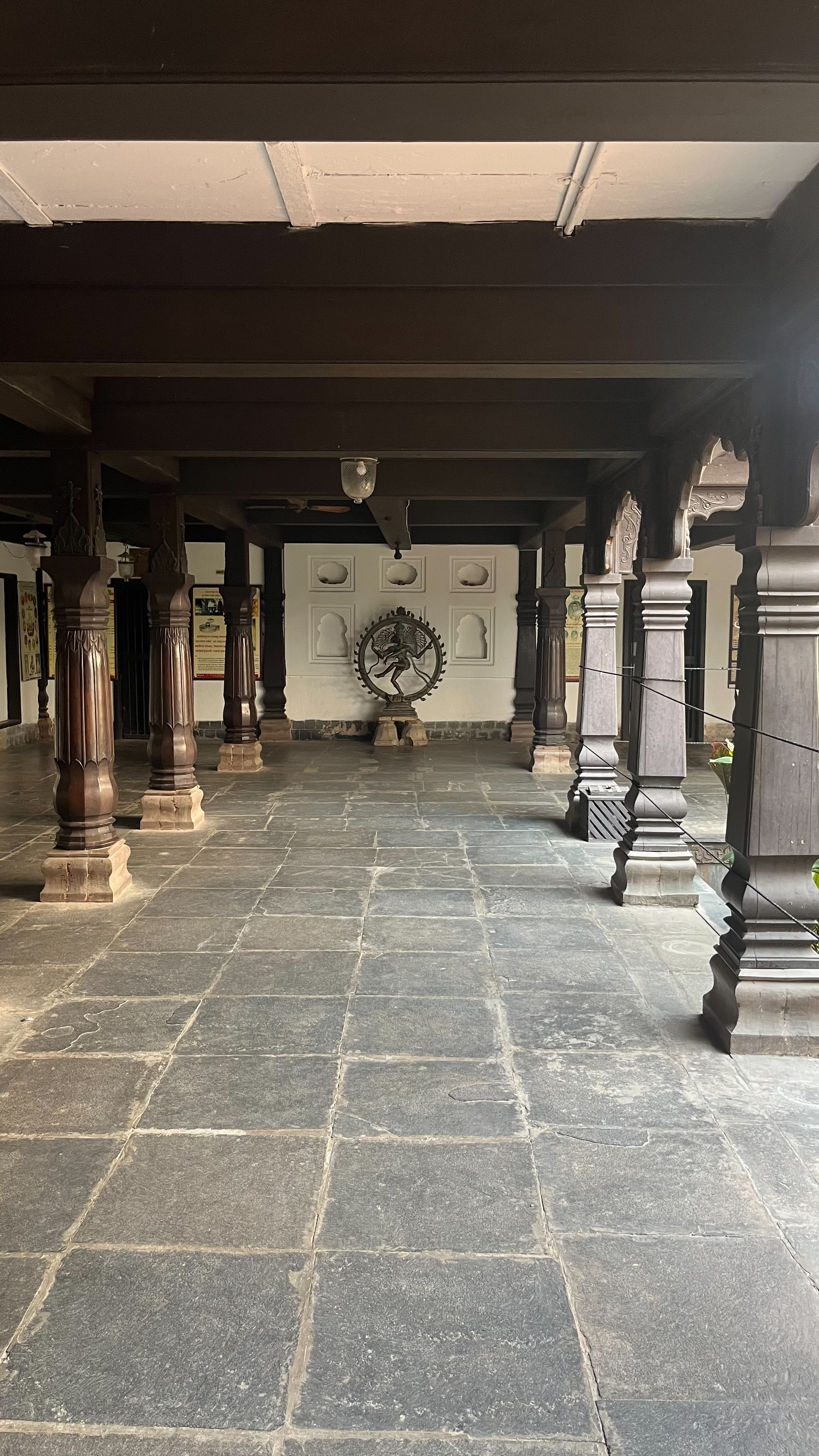
Hall

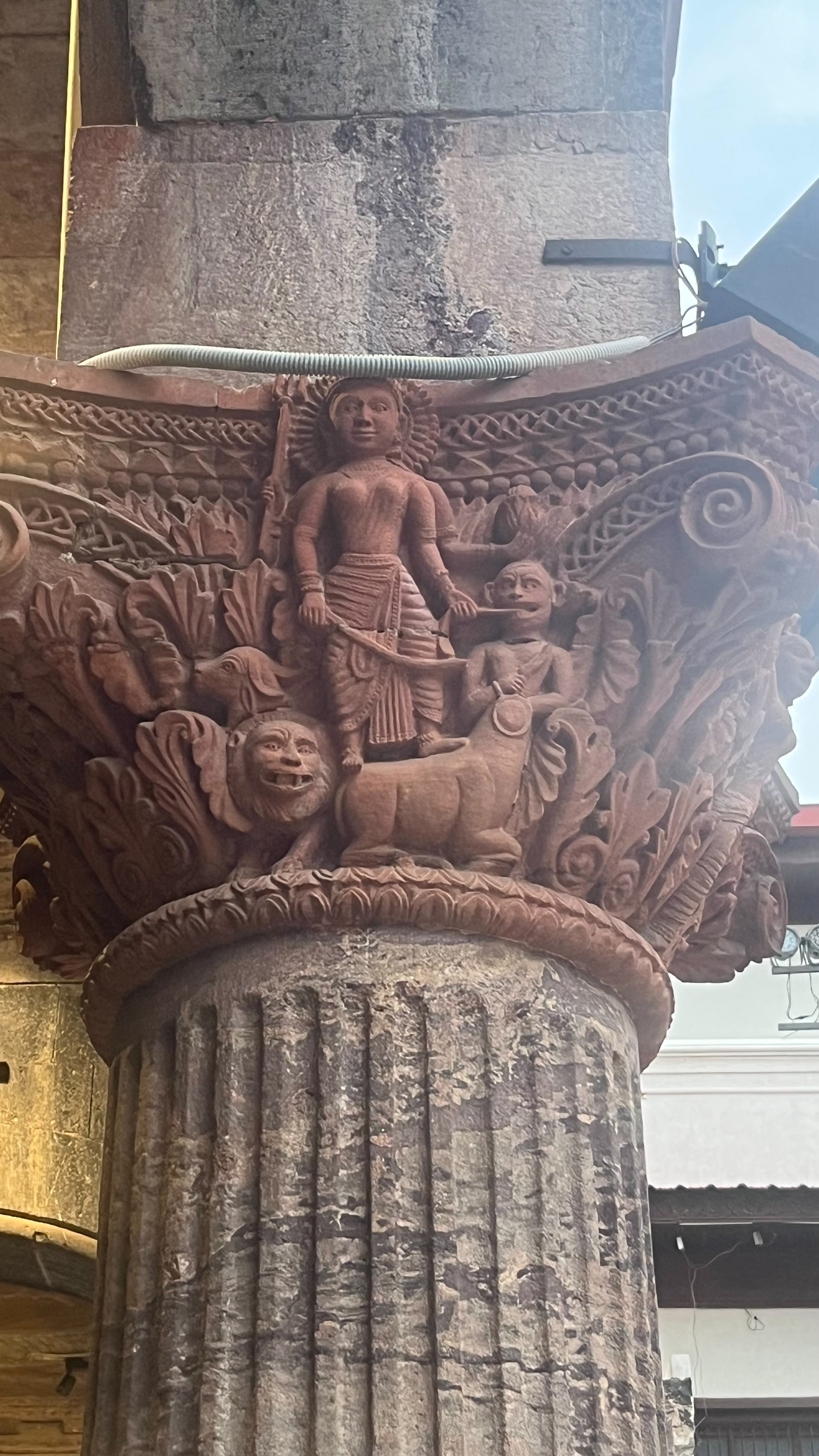
Detailed wood carving

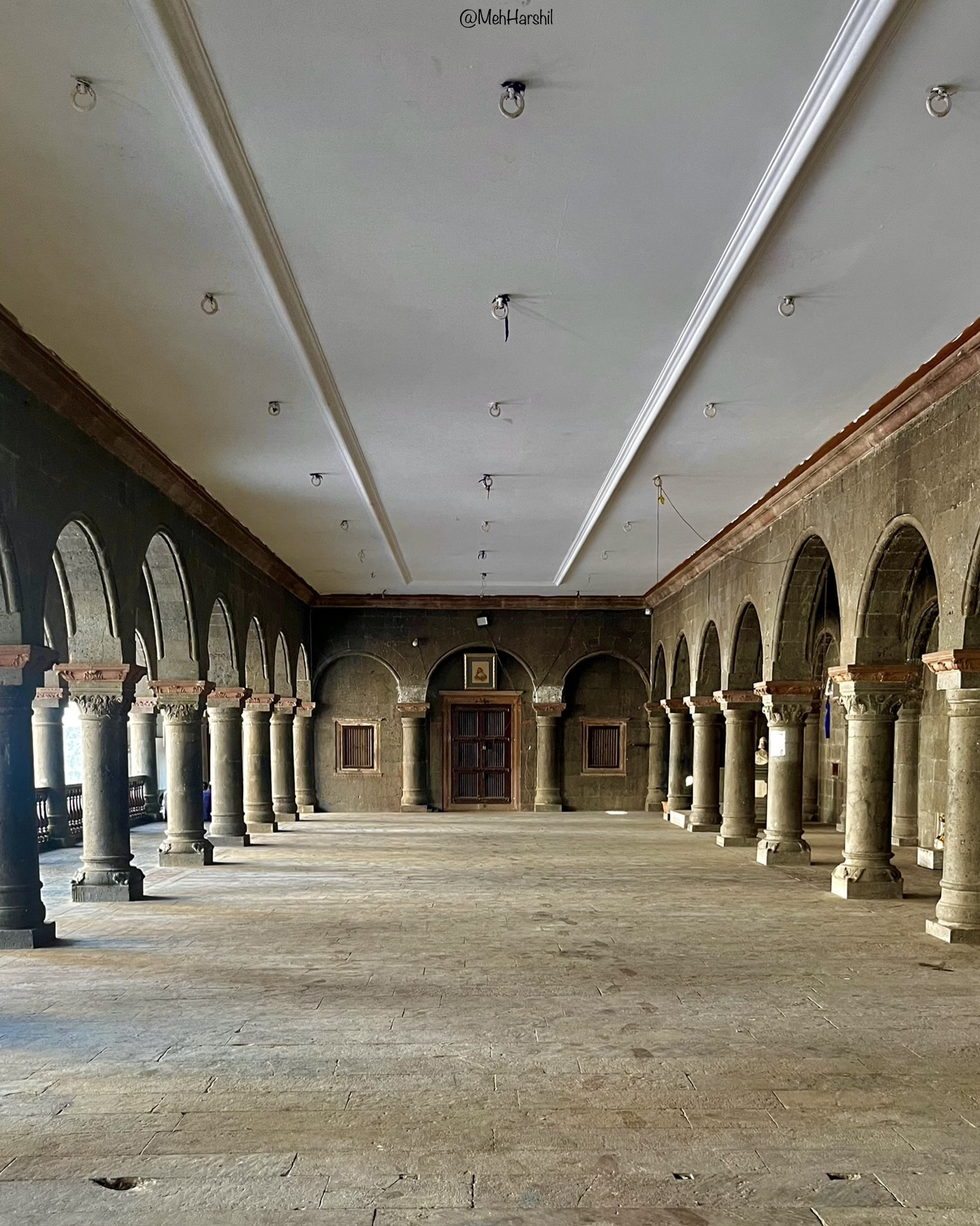
Another hall

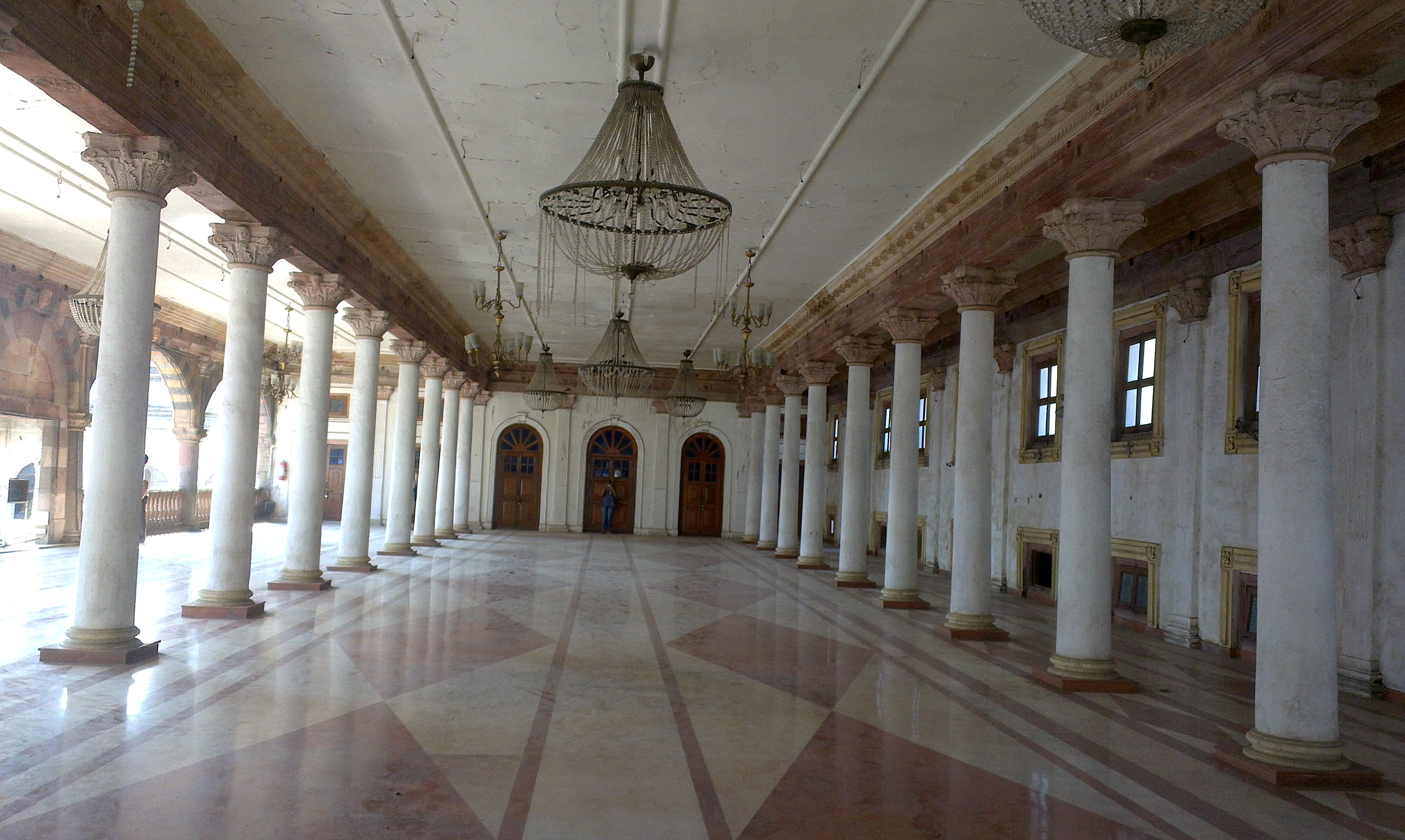
One of the main halls

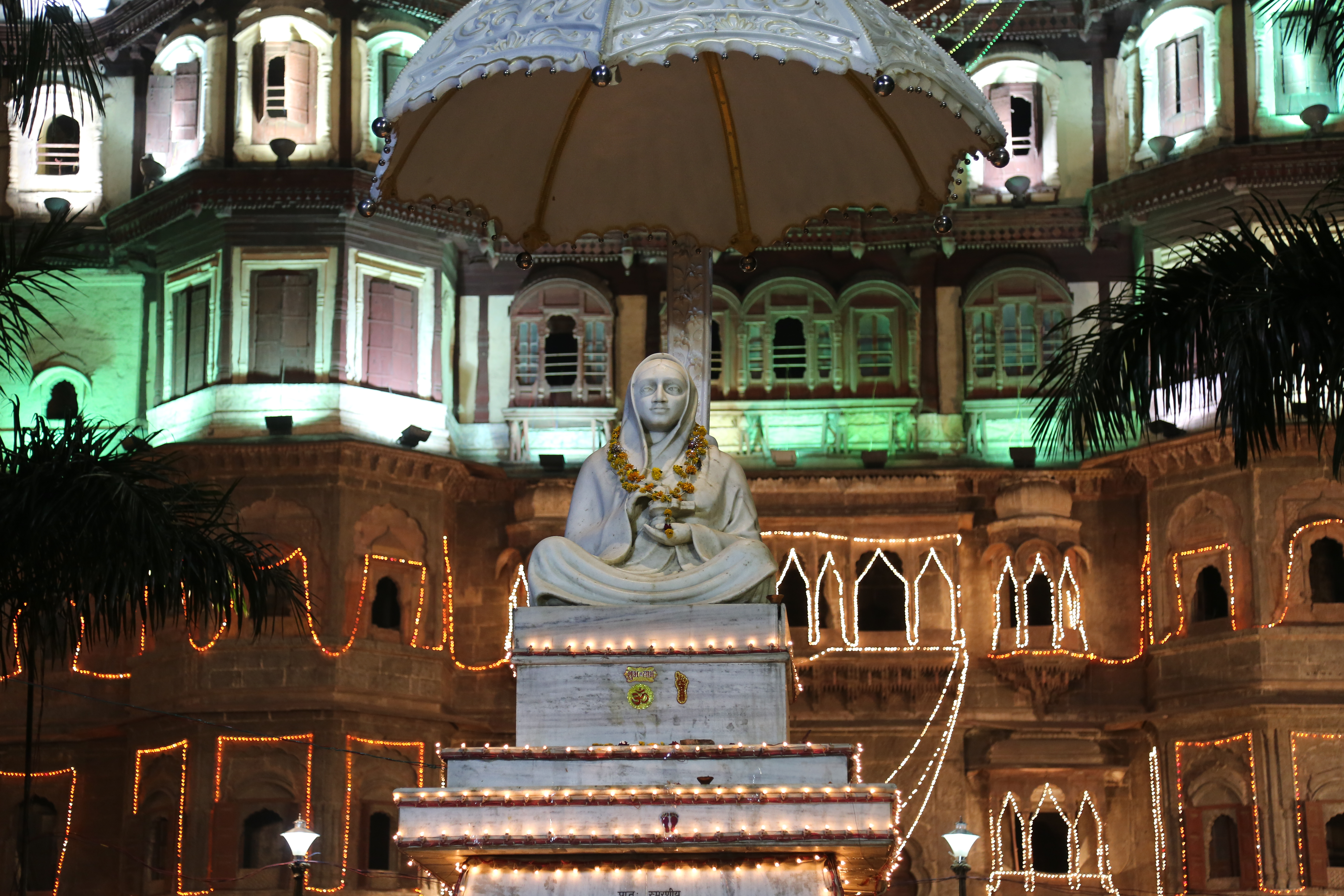
Ahilyabai Holkar statue in front

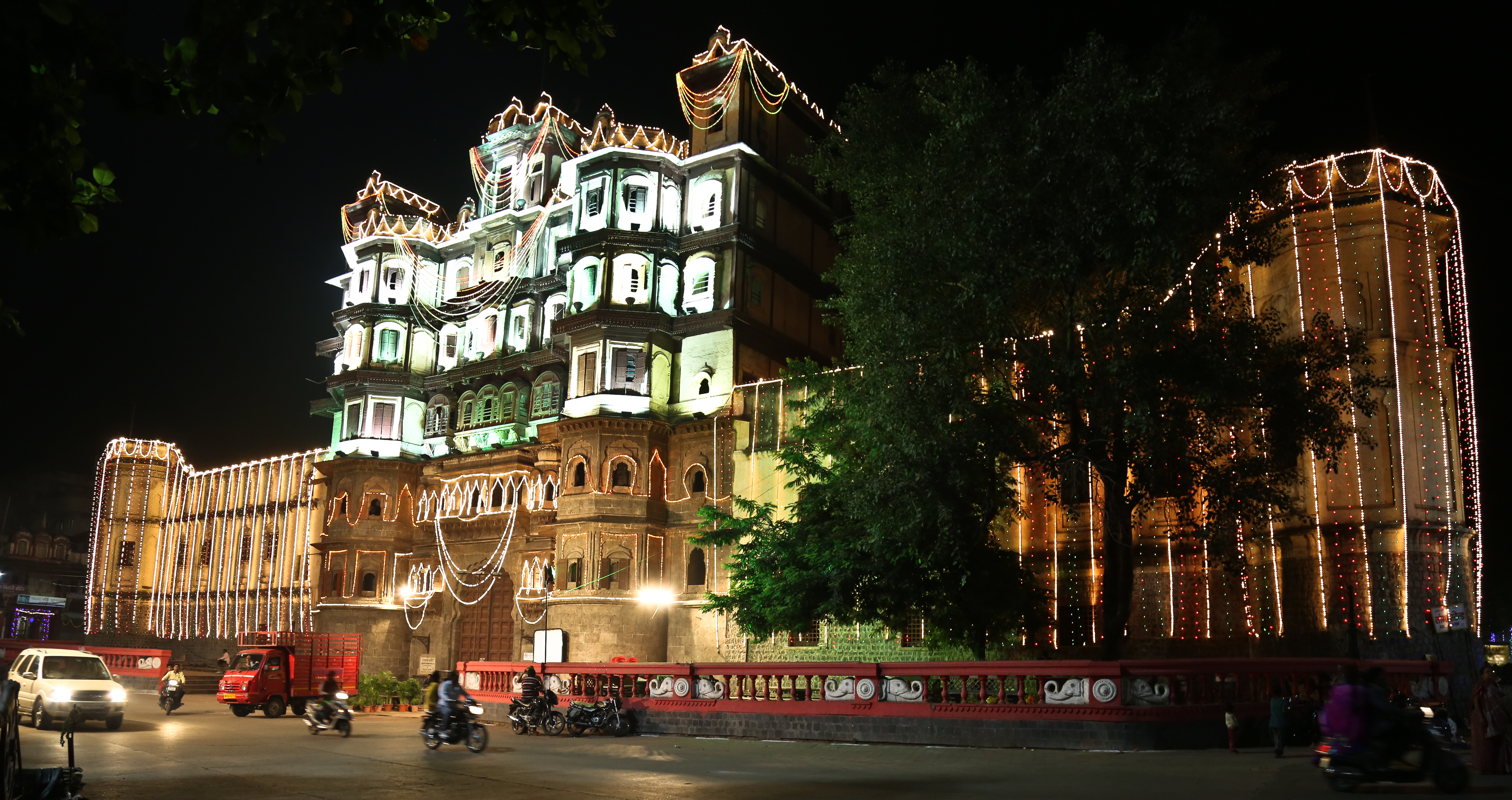
Rajwada Palace as seen on Diwali 2014

== See also ==
- Lalbagh Palace
- Manik Bagh
- Shiv Vilas Palace, Indore
- Yeshwant Club, Indore
- New Palace, Kolhapur of the Bhonsle Chhatrapatis
- Laxmi Vilas Palace, Vadodara of the Gaekwads
- Jai Vilas Palace, Gwalior of the Scindias
- Shaniwar Wada, Pune of the Peshwas
- Thanjavur Maratha palace of the Bhonsles
- Narmada Kothi (Maharajah of Indore Retreat Palace), Barwaha
