= Narmada Valley Development Authority =

Indian government organization

Narmada Valley Development Authority नर्मदा घाटी विकास प्राधिकरण
- Type: Government Organization
- Founded: 1985-08-09
- Headquarters: Bhopal, Madhya Pradesh
- Area served: Madhya Pradesh
- Key people: Shri Mohan Yadav, Chief Minister (ex-officio Chairman); Shri E. Ramesh Kumar, IAS (VC)
- Website: www.mpsdc.gov.in/nvda/

Narmada Valley Development Authority (NVDA) concerns Narmada River, the river of Madhya Pradesh. With 87% of its catchment area lying in Madhya Pradesh, it becomes all the more important for the state to exploit this enormous water resource. It was with this motto in mind that the Narmada Valley Development Authority (NVDA) was formed by the government of MP on 9 August 1985. NVDA oversees all major development projects in the Narmada Basin. The body also ensures that proper rehabilitation is provided to the displaced, and the negative impacts on environment are minimized by taking appropriate measures.

== History ==
Narmada being one of the major rivers in Central India, there has been a large number of studies aiming at exploiting the abundant water resource. This has also led to various disputes between Madhya Pradesh, Maharashtra and Gujarat, the three states through which a major portion of Narmada flows. One such dispute was regarding the construction of Navagam dam in Gujarat, which would submerge areas in Madhya Pradesh and Maharashtra. To resolve the dispute between the states in sharing the Narmada water, the Narmada Water Disputes Tribunal was formed by the Government of India in 1969. In 1979, 10 years after its formation, Narmada Water Disputes Tribunal awarded 18.25 Million Acre Feet (MAF) out of the total 27 Million Acre Feet (MAF) of water to Madhya Pradesh. This was however under the condition that the state has to completely utilize the allocated water by 2025. If it failed to do so, the un-utilized water will be reallocated to other states. Madhya Pradesh government formed Narmada Valley Development Authority in 1985 to oversee the progress of the projects being planned in the Narmada Basin.

== Narmada Basin ==
Narmada is the fifth largest river in India. It is also the largest West flowing river in India, with a total length of 1312 km. Known as the 'Life Line of Madhya Pradesh', 87% of Narmada lies in Madhya Pradesh, covering the districts Shahdol, Balaghat, Rajnandgaon, Mandla, Seoni, Dindori, Katni, Jabalpur, Damoh, Sagar, Narsinghpur, Chhindwara, Betul, Hoshangabad, Harda, Raisen, Sehore, Khandwa, Indore, Dewas, Khargone, Dhar, Jhabua & Barwani. Besides Madhya Pradesh, the river also flows through minor parts of Gujarat and Maharashtra. Narmada has a potential of irrigating over 60,000 square kilometres (23,000 sq mi) of land along with a capacity to generate about 3 gigawatts of hydro electric power. Narmada Water Disputes Tribunal (NWDT) had allocated fixed share of water for each of the four states as follows:

State	Millions of Acre-feet	Billions of cubic metres
Madhya Pradesh	18.25	14,407
Gujarat	9.00	7,105
Rajasthan	0.50	395
Maharashtra	0.25	197
Total	28.00	22,104

Each state has to utilize its share of water allocated by 2025, when failing, it will get reallocated to other states. So as to completely utilize the allocated share of water of 18.25 MAF, Madhya Pradesh government came up with 29 major, 135 medium and over 3,000 minor projects which are scheduled to be completed by 2025.

Table below provide details on the major dams and canals being planned on the Narmada Basin by NVDA

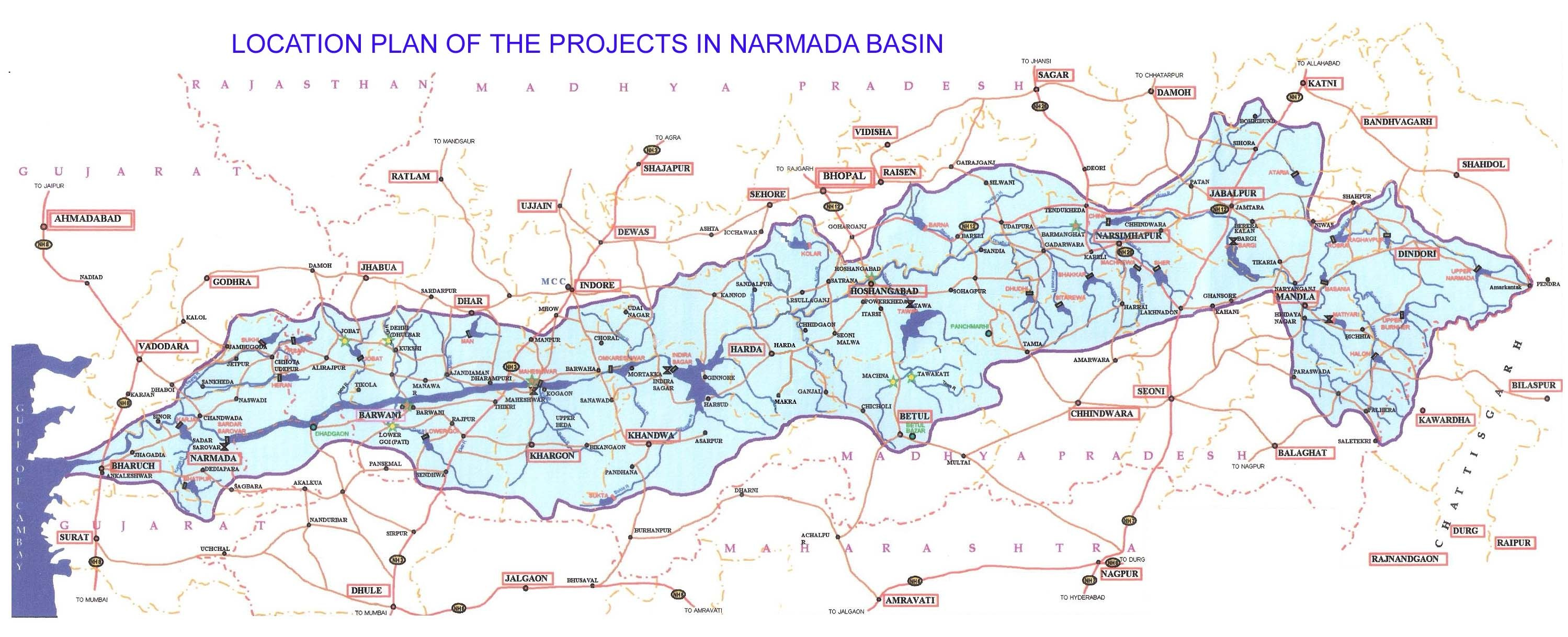
Layout of Water Resources Development Projects in the Narmada Basin in Gujarat & Madhya Pradesh

S. No.	Name of Project	Benefits (ha.)	Power (MW)	Irrigation (m^{3}))
Completed Projects
1	Tawa	2.469	13.50	2386.72
2	Barna	0.548	—	559.82
3	Kolar	0.451	—	435.90
4	Sukta	0.166	—	170.57
5	Matiari (Dhobatoria)	0.101	—	88.38
6	Man Project	0.15		140.00
7	Jobat Project	0.098		112.00
Ongoing Projects
8	Rani Awanti Bai Sagar	1.57	100.00	1008.00
	Bargi Diversion	2.45		1853.10
9	Indirasagar Project	1.23	1000.00	1674.00
	Canal Power House of ISP		15.00
10	Omkareshwar Project	1.47	520.00	1300.00
11	Punasa lift	0.323		105.00
12	Upper Beda	0.099		90.00
Proposed Projects
13	Upper Narmada	0.185		178.93
14	Upper Burhner	0.098		82.72
15	Halon	0.117		134.00
16	Ataria	0.129		112.36
17	Chinki	0.708		1969.90
18	Sher	0.647		567.96
19	Machchrewa
20	Shakkar
21	Dudhi	0.506		444.49
22	Morand	0.522		465.48
23	Ganjal
24	Lower Goi	0.137		133.00
25	Raghavpur		20
26	Rosara		25
27	Basaniyar		20
28	Sitareva		15

== Major Projects ==
=== Indira Sagar Project ===
The Indirasagar Dam is a multipurpose key project on the Narmada River at Narmadanagar in the Khandwa district of Madhya Pradesh in India. The foundation stone of the project was laid by Indira Gandhi, former Prime Minister of India, on 23 October 1984. Construction of the main dam started in 1992. The downstream projects of ISP are Omkareshwar, Maheshwar and Sardar Sarovar Project.

The project envisages construction of a 92 m high and 653 m long concrete gravity dam. It provides irrigation for 1,230 square kilometers of land with annual production of 2700 million units in the districts of Khandwa and Khargone in Madhya Pradesh and power generation of 1000 MW installed capacity (8x125). The reservoir of 7,900,000 acre-feet (9.7 km^{3}) live storage capacity was created. The dam, built as a joint venture between Madhya Pradesh Irrigation Project and National Hydroelectric Power Corporation, is the source of the Indra Gandhi canal. It was commissioned in May 2005.

== See also ==
- Narmada Kothi (Maharajah of Indore Retreat Palace), Barwaha (NVDA Circle No. 8)
