= Lalbagh Palace =

Residence of the Holkar Maharaja of Indore, Madhya Pradesh, India

Coordinates: 22.7001°N 75.8471°E

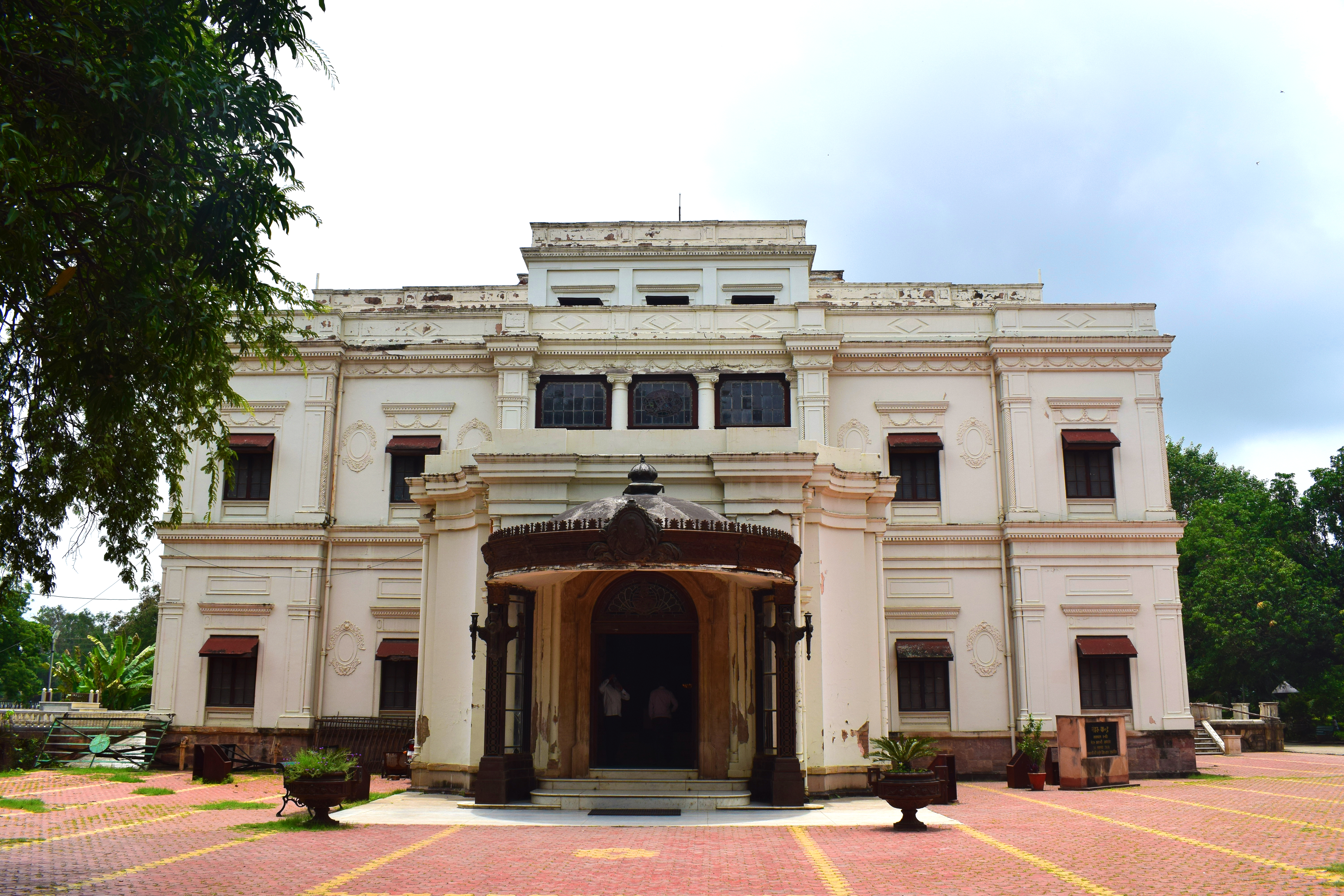
Lalbagh palace, Indore

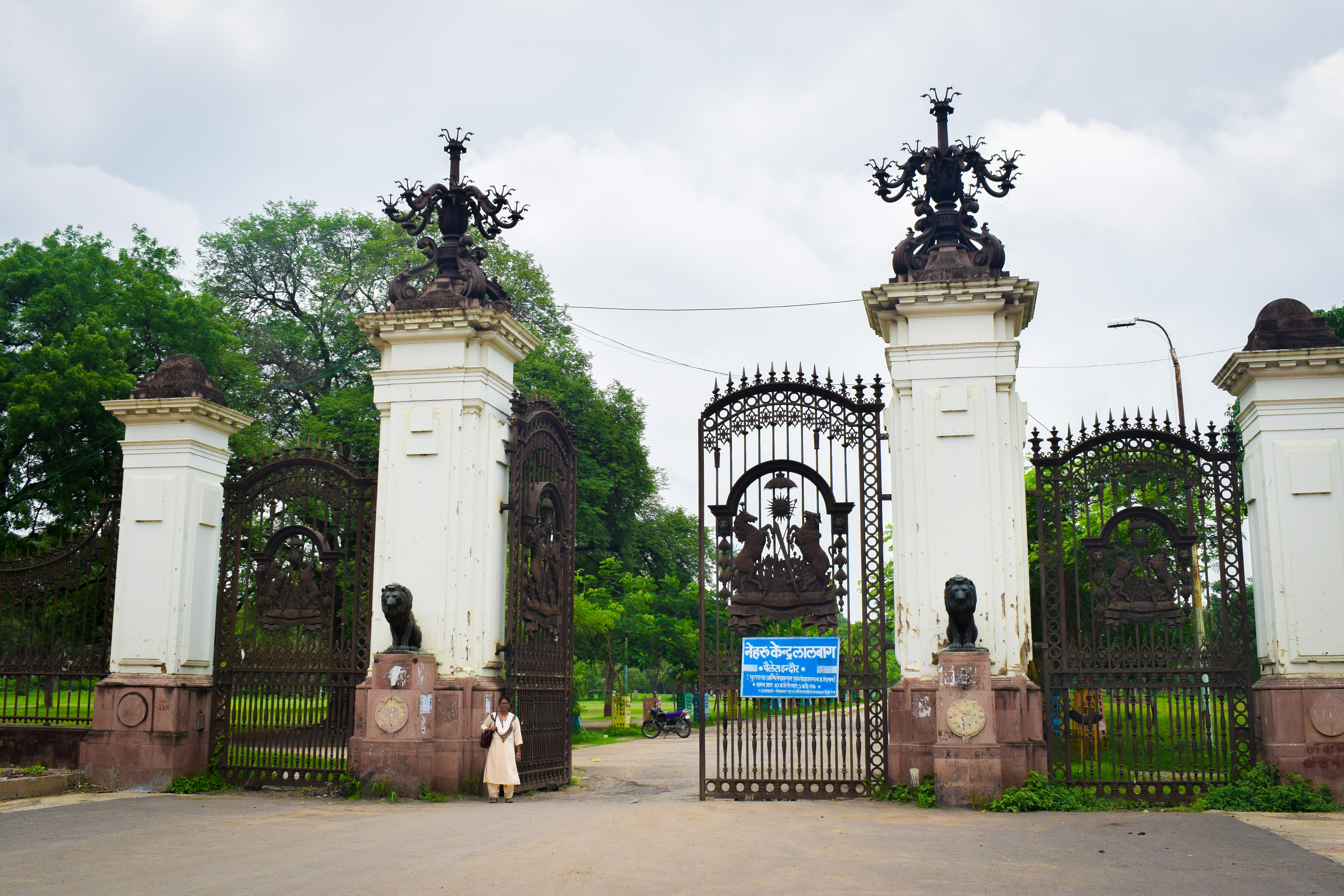
Main gate of Lalbagh Palace

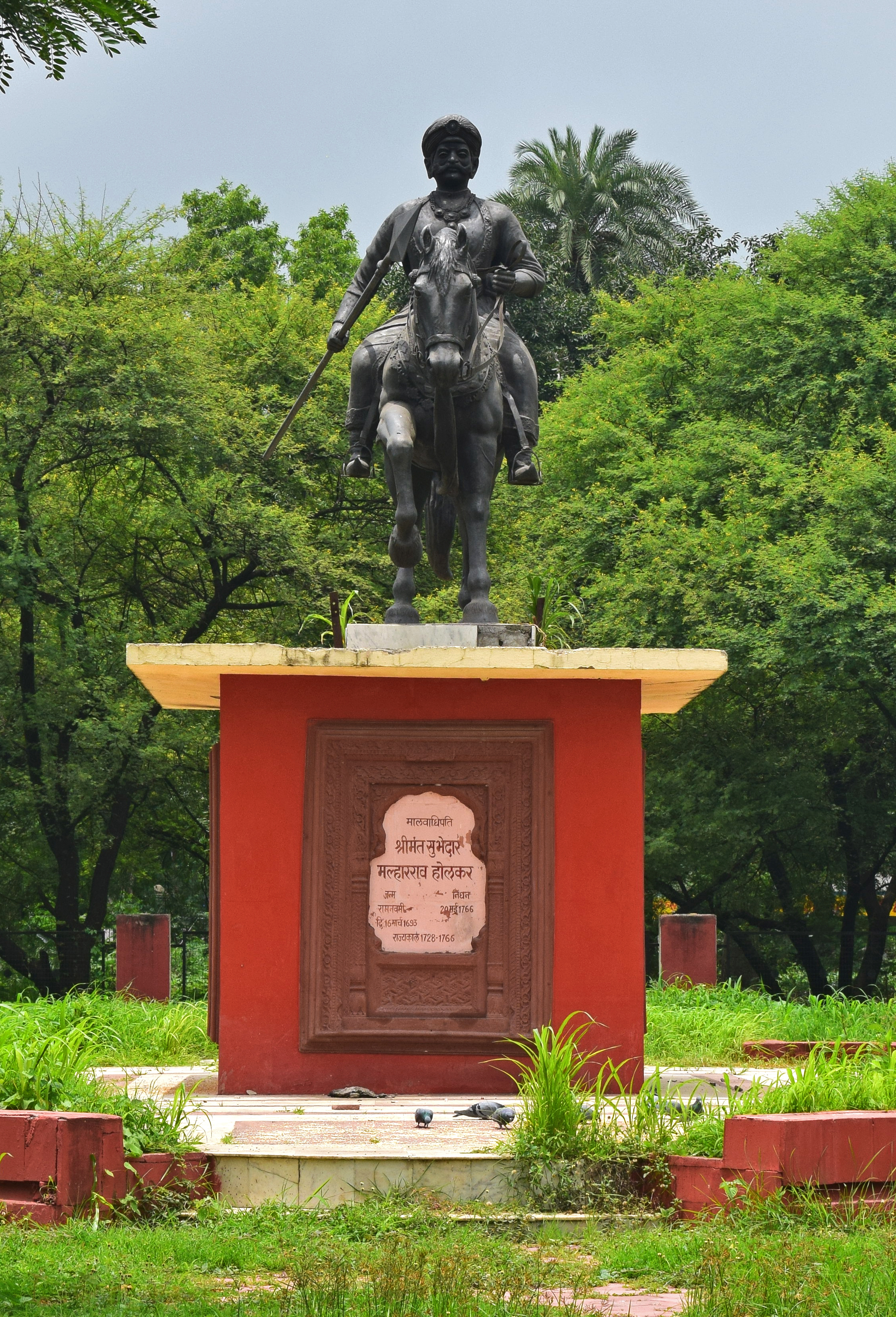
A statue of Subedar Malhar Rao Holkar (1693–1766)

Lalbagh Palace was built by the Holkar Dynasty, and is situated in Indore, Madhya Pradesh, India.

The Holkar family resided in the palace up to 1978. After the death of Tukojirao Holkar III, his granddaughter Usha Raje established a trust and looked after the estate. Later, the former Chief Minister of Madhya Pradesh Arjun Singh brought it under the control of the state government.

== History ==
The palace was home to the powerful Maratha Holkar dynasty. Spread over 76 acres of property, the construction of the 45-room palace happened in three phases. It is built in the Italian Renaissance Revival architecture style and once had a 20-acre rose garden, while its main gates are modelled after those at the Buckingham Palace, by Triggs of Calcutta. Panelling, bronze work, decorative plaster, stonework, and furniture for the palace were provided by H.H. Martyn & Co. of Cheltenham, England.

Tukojirao Holkar II in 1886, built this palace, his son Shivajirao Holkar continued building it and his grandson, Tukojirao Holkar III in 1926, further expanded it. After the death of Tukojirao Holkar III in 1978, his third wife, an American, Sharmishtha Devi (formerly Nancy Anne Miller) moved out and subsequently, much of the first floor was destroyed in a fire.

In the 1980s, the palace fell into disrepair and was prone to theft of its antiques before the state government acquired the property in 1987 for Rs 64.46 lakh.

Lalbagh Palace Indore, now serves as a museum.

== Current status ==
It is inscribed by the Archaeological Survey of India (ASI) as a protected monument.

It will be renovated by the World Monuments Fund under the aegis of the Madhya Pradesh state Government.

Amongst others, parts of Hindi film Kalank (2019) with Varun Dhawan, Alia Bhatt, and Madhuri Dixit, were shot here.

== Gallery ==
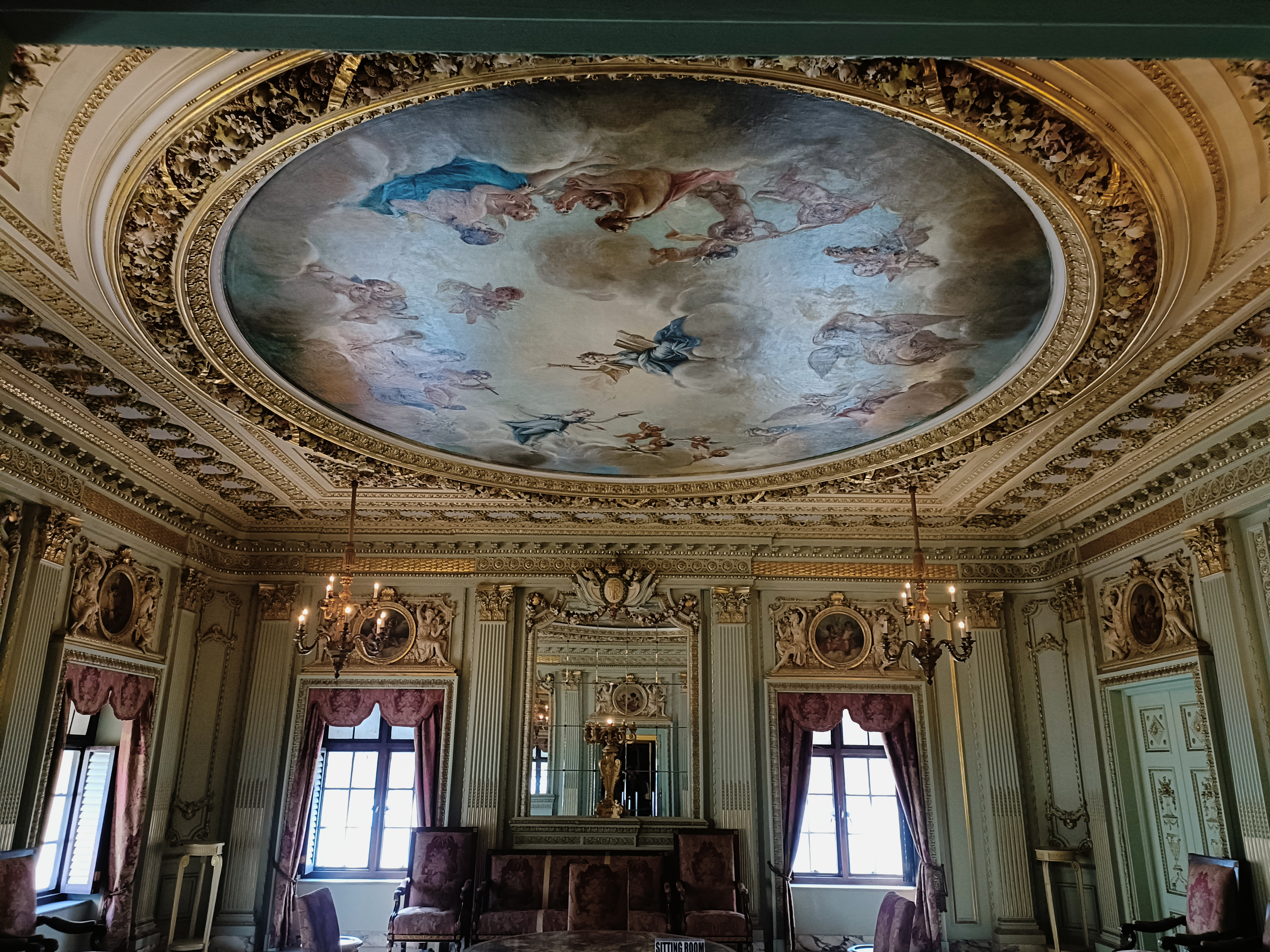

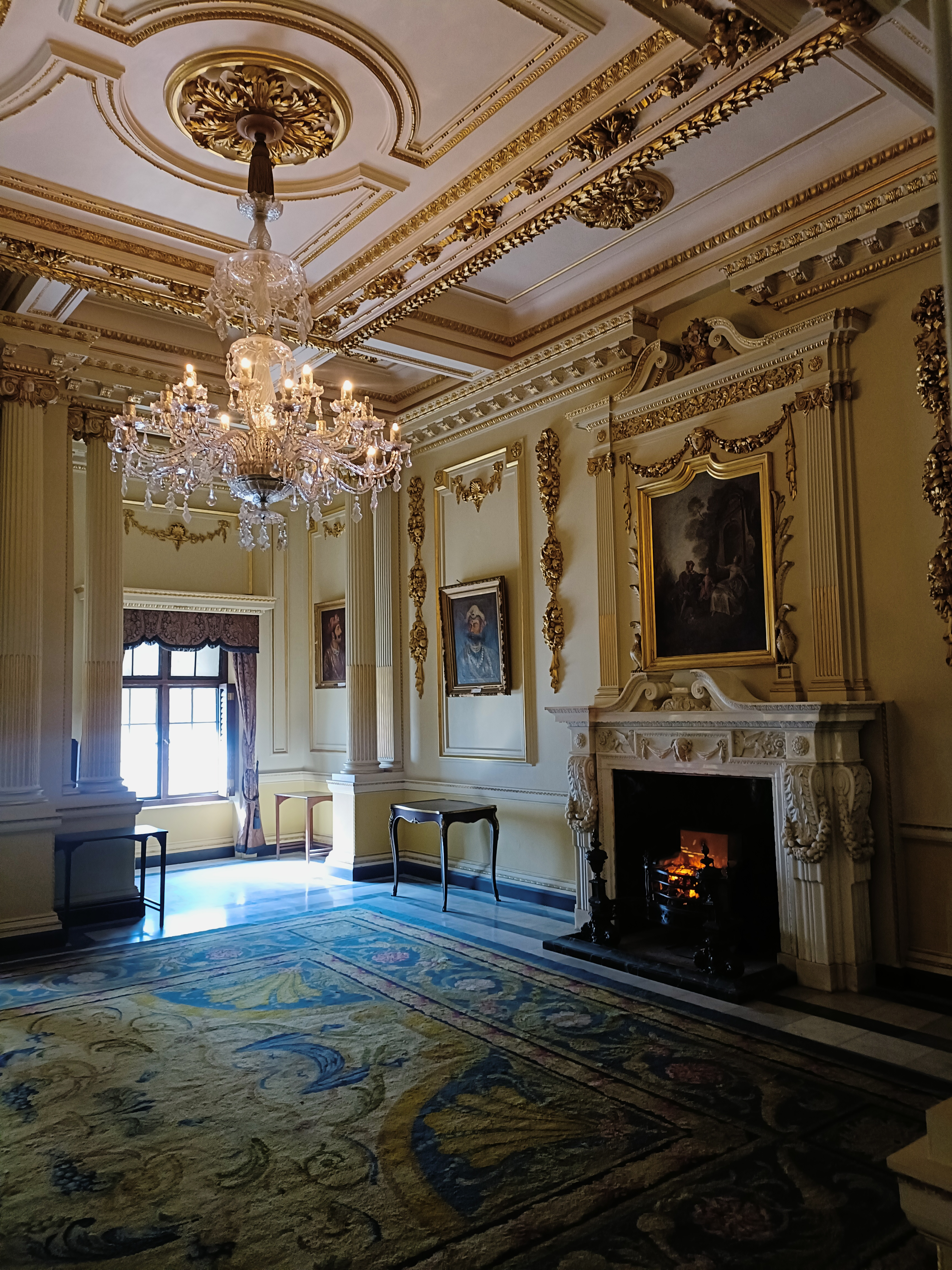

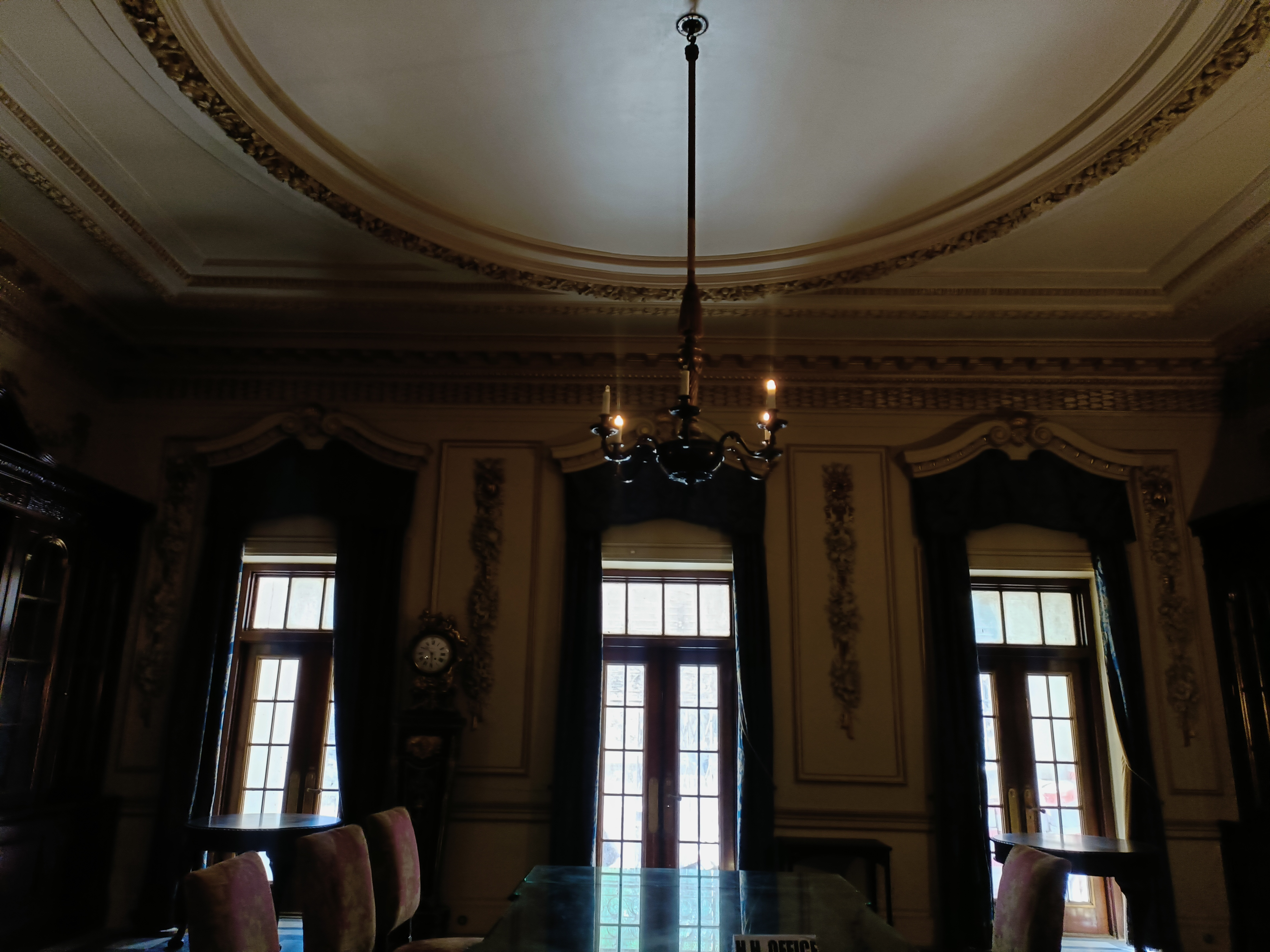

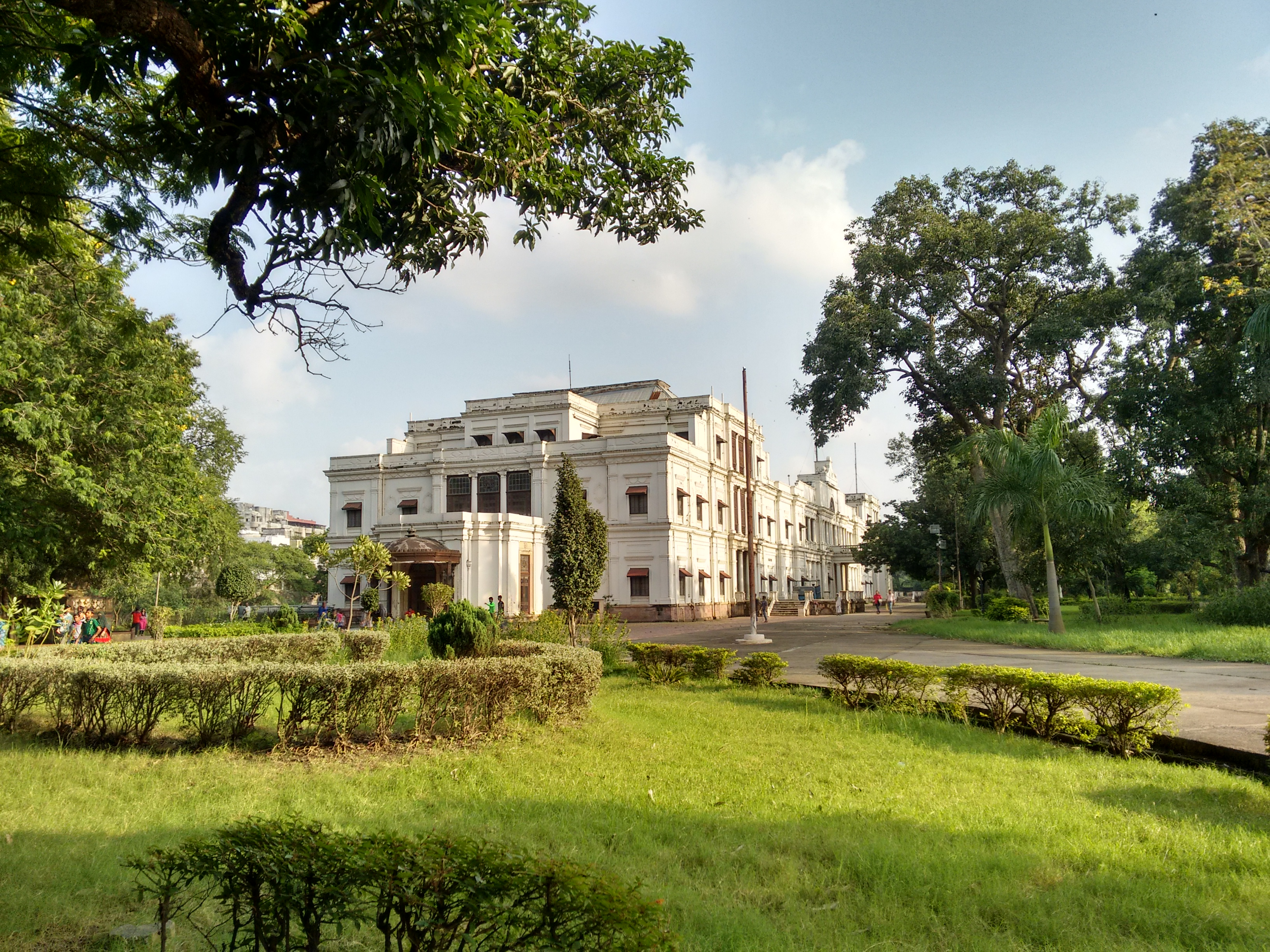
View of the palace from the palace gardens

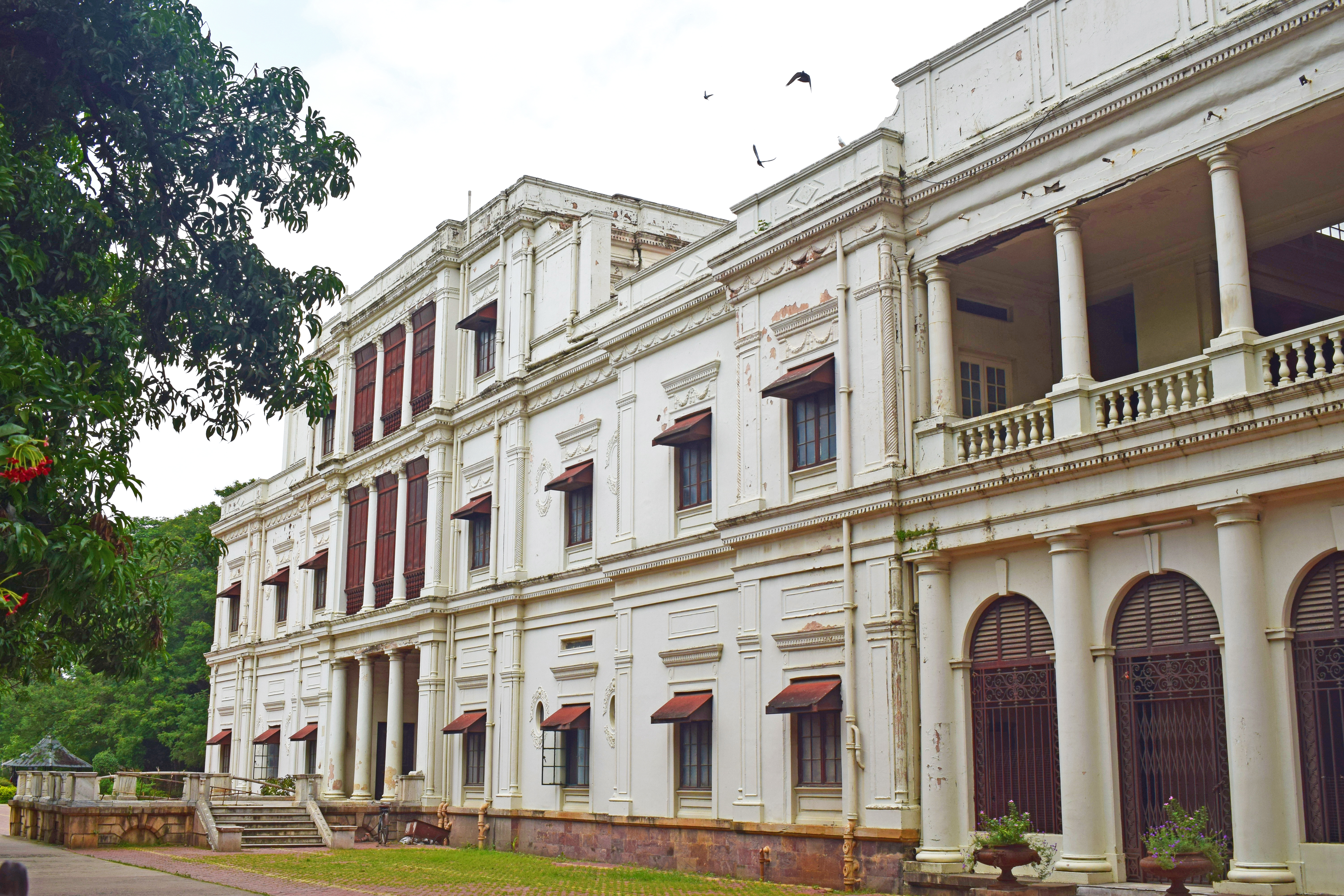
Side View

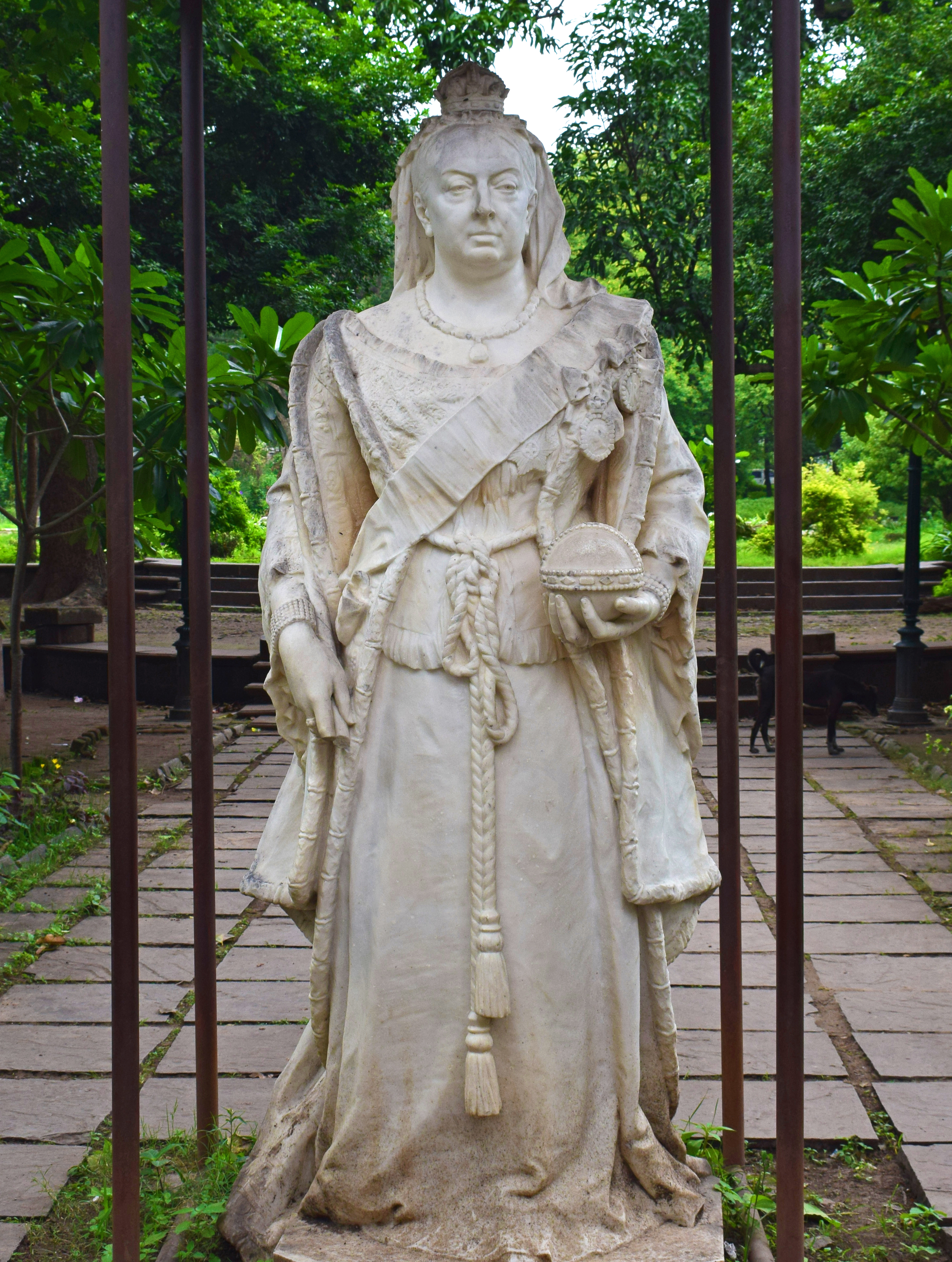
A statue of Queen Victoria in the premises of the palace

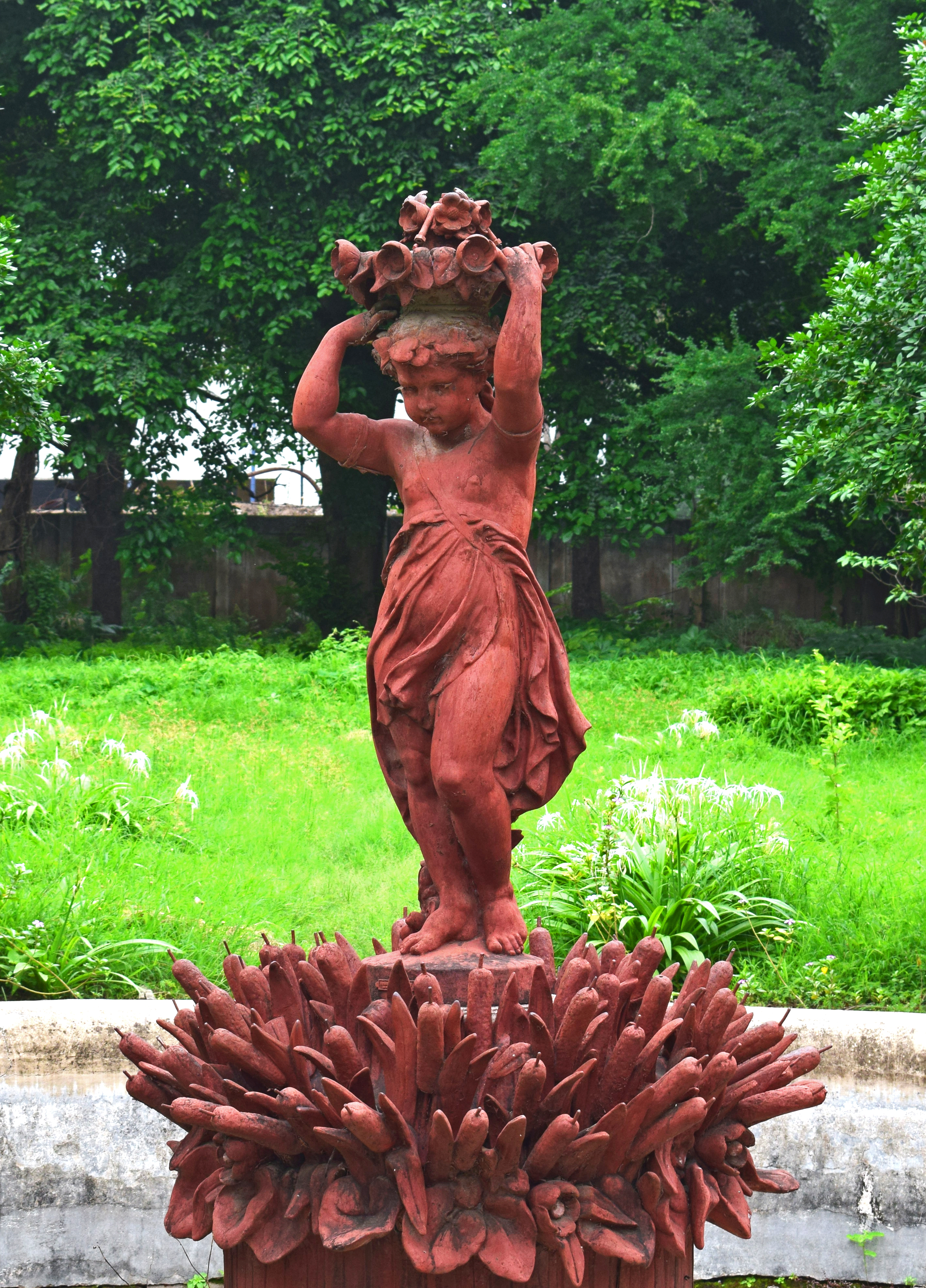
Statue of a Putto

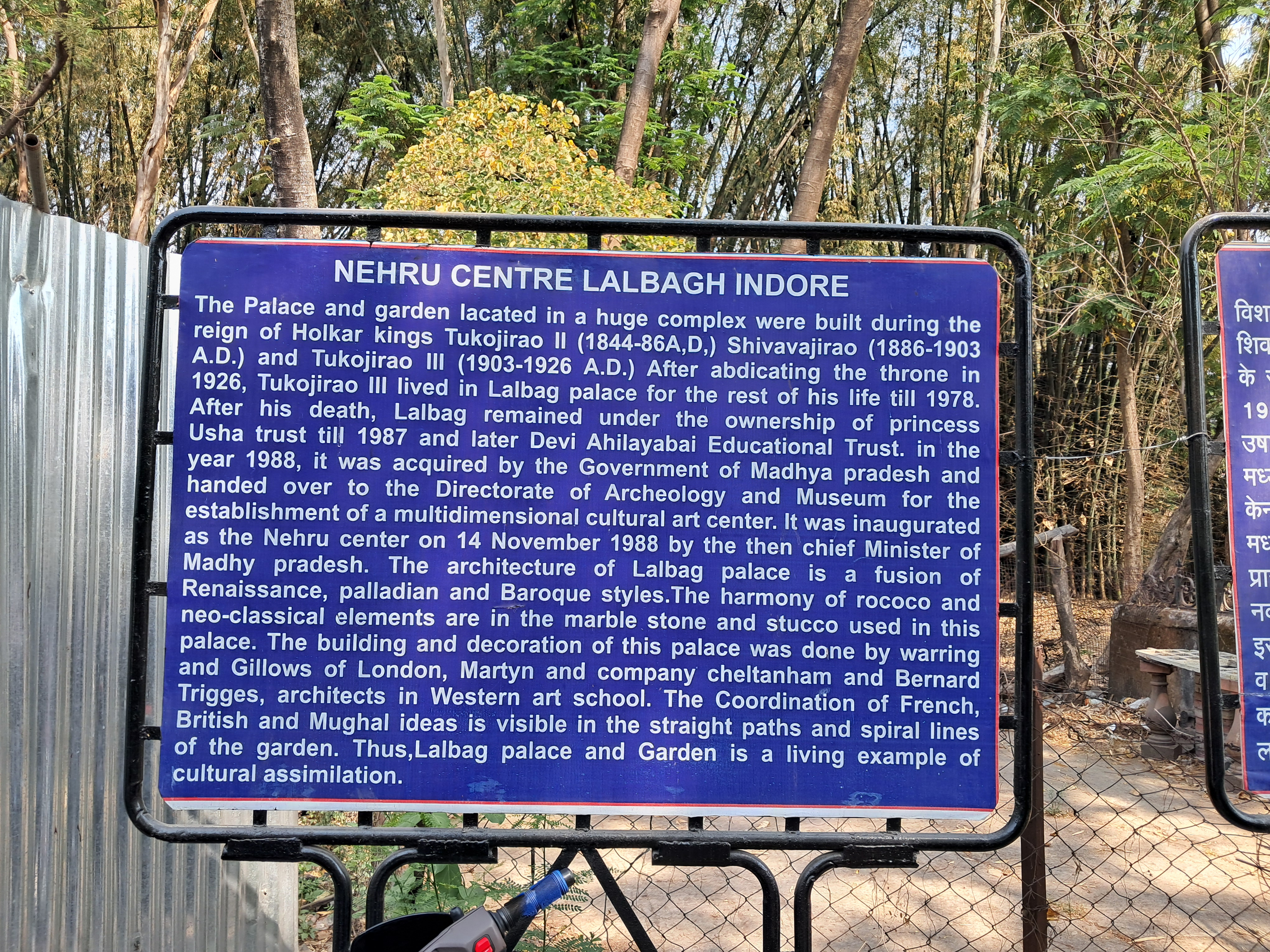
Information Board displayed at the Nehru Centre in Palace

== See also ==
- Rajwada, main palace
- Manik Bagh
