= Daly College =

Coordinates: 22.7012°N 75.8933°E

The Daly College, Indore
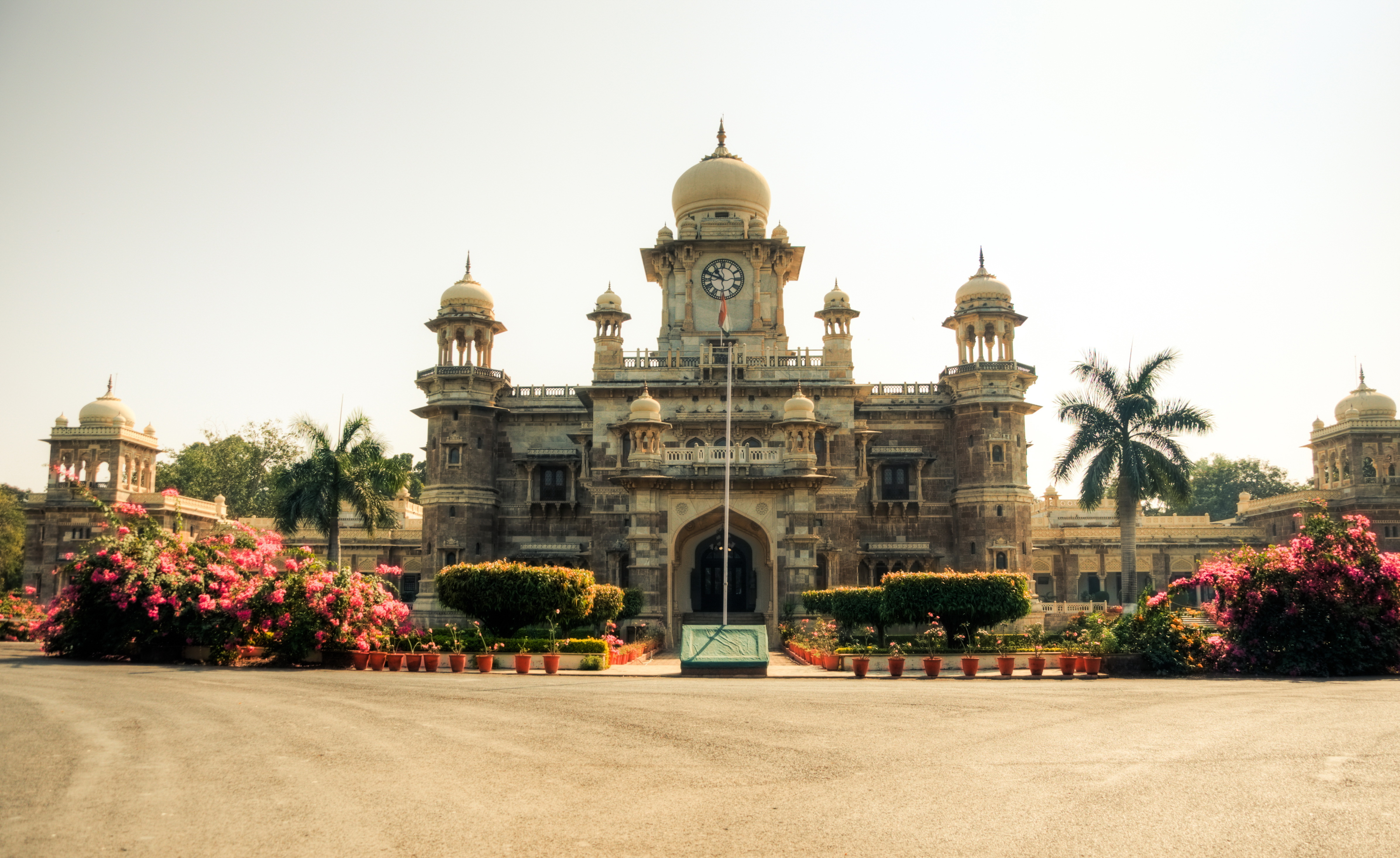
- The Daly College main building
- Indore, Madhya Pradesh; India

Information
- Type: Private boarding school Day school
- Motto: "Gyanamev Shakti" ("Knowledge itself is Power ")
- Established: 1870; 156 years ago (as Residency School); 1882; 144 years ago (as The Daly College)
- Principal: Gunmeet Singh Bindra
- Grades: Pre Primary – 12th Boarding: 4th to 12th
- Enrollment: 2000 appx.
- Campus size: 118.8 acres (0.481 km^{2})
- School fees: ₹4 lakh per annum (day school) ₹7.5 lakh per annum (boarding)
- Affiliation: Central Board of Secondary Education
- Website: dalycollege.org

The Daly College is a group of institutions consisting of a co-educational private boarding, day school, a private junior school, an undergraduate management school and a postgraduate business school, located in Indore, Madhya Pradesh, India. It was founded by Sir Henry Daly of the British Indian Army during India's colonial British Raj, following an English public school model. The school started in 1870 as the Residency School. It was then renamed as the East Rajkumar College in 1876, and in 1882, it came to be known as The Daly College. It was established by the Resident Governor of the erstwhile Presidency, to educate the children of the royalty, nobility and aristocracy of Central Indian Princely States of the 'Marathas', 'Rajputs', 'Mohameddans' and 'Bundelas'. It is one of the oldest co-educational boarding schools in the world.

As of 2015 the school has more than 2,000 students. It is ranked 1st in India by Educationworld India for the year 2015 in the category day-cum-boarding schools.

Daly College is affiliated to the Central Board of Secondary Education (CBSE) and CIE. In 2007, the first International Round Square Conference was held at Daly College, and was attended by former King Constantine II of Greece as its president. In December that year, a commemorative stamp on the college was released by India Post. The school is a member of the G20 Schools Group. The Daly College also has an undergraduate management school — the Daly College of Business Management (DCBM) which is affiliated to Devi Ahilya Vishwavidyalaya (informally abbreviated DAVV, formerly University of Indore), and provides a Bachelor of Business Administration degree in different disciplines. Daly College also has a Business School under its umbrella – the Daly College Business School (DCBS), affiliated to AICTE, DCBS offers a Post Graduate Diploma in Management (PGDM) in various disciplines.

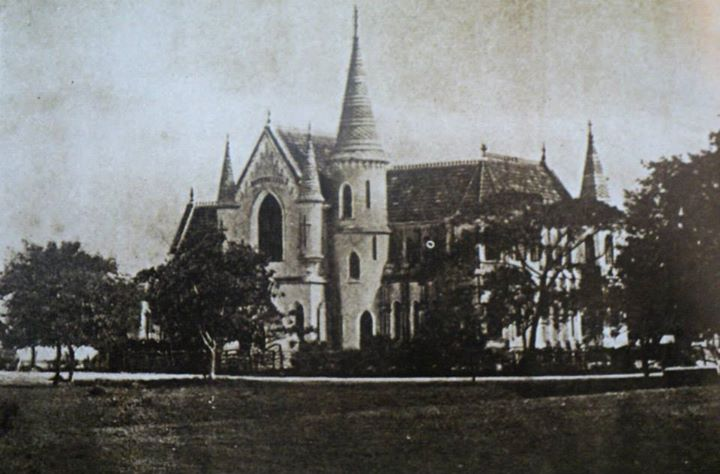
Old Campus of The Daly College, Indore

== History ==
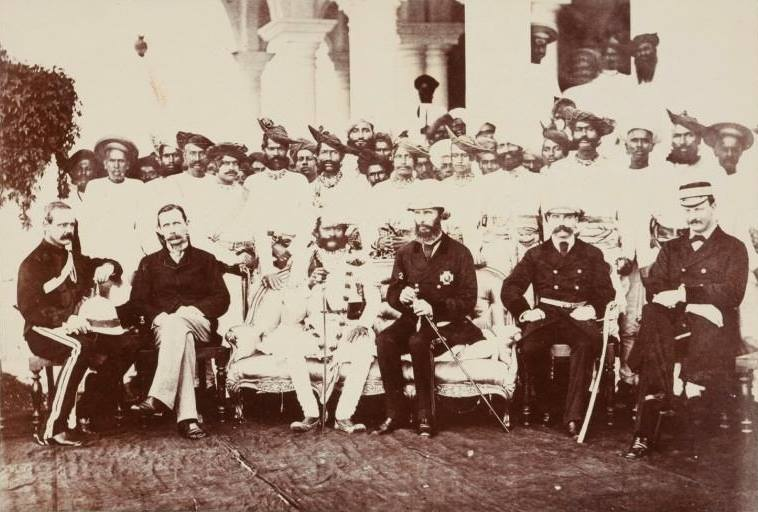
HH Maharaja Sir Jayaji Rao Scindia of Gwalior State, General Sir Henry Daly (Founder of The Daly College), with British officers and Maratha nobility (Sardars, Jagirdars & Mankaris) in Indore, Holkar State, c. 1879.

The school has its origins in the Residency School, founded by Sir Henry Daly Governor General of India's Agent to Central India Agency in 1870, as a school for the children of nobility and aristocrats in the Indore Residency. It was later renamed as the East Rajkumar College in 1876, and in 1882 the school received its present name, The Daly College, after its founder. The school was visited by Lord Northbrook (1st Earl of Northbrook) Viceroy and Governor-General of India in 1875, thereafter it was renamed "Indore Residency College" in 1876. In 1882 the Chiefs named the school "The Daly College" to honour the contribution of Sir Henry Daly.

The foundation stone of the new building was laid on 14 November 1885 by Lord Dufferin (1st Marquess of Dufferin and Ava) Viceroy and Governor-General of India, as a memorial in the honour of Sir Henry Daly. In 1891 the two Maratha Maharajas, Sir Shivaji Rao Holkar of Indore (Hokar State) and Sir Madho Rao Scindia of Gwalior donated the two student houses, 'Gwalior House' and 'Indore House'. In 1898 the "Rajkumar School", which had opened at Nowgaon near Chhatarpur (Bundelkhand) in 1872, was amalgamated with the Daly College. Later Lt. Gen. Maharajadhiraja Sir Madho Rao Scindia, Maharaja of Gwalior unveiled a bust in the honour of Sir Henry Daly in the main building of the school.

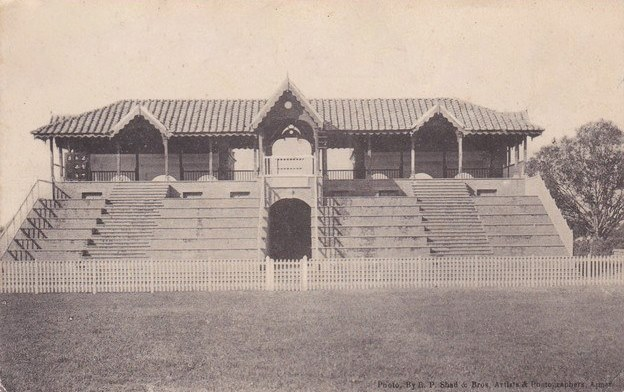
The Scindia Pavilion, Circa 1910s

In 1905, Sir Henry's son, Sir Hugh Daly, was appointed agent to the Governor-General for Central India at Indore, to the position previously occupied by his father. He took great interest in the Daly College and made it flourish it as a Chief's College. Maharajadhiraja Sir Tukojirao Holkar III, Maharaja of Indore (Hokar State) then donated 118 acres (0.48 km^{2}) of land east of the old campus and rulers contributed to build on the newly acquired land. Construction started in 1906 on two student houses, a temple, a mosque and the Principal's residence. The main building was constructed with marble from the Udaipur quarries and was designed in the Indo-Saracenic architecture by Col. Sir Samuel Swinton Jacob. The clock tower was donated by Maharaja Sir Sayaji Rao III Gaekwad of Baroda.

The main building was officially inaugurated on 8 November 1912 by Lord Hardinge (1st Baron Hardinge of Penshurst) Viceroy and Governor-General of India, after which the old campus was given up. For the next 28 years the college was open exclusively to the sons of the Princes and Chiefs of Central India as well as the rest in the Indian Empire. In 1940 the Board of Governors decided to prepare students for a modern and free India. The Daly College came together with a few other institutions and started the Indian Public Schools Conference. Its doors were thrown open to admissions on merit, regardless of caste or creed. Recently, the school added an 1100+ seat auditorium to its infrastructure.

The school became coeducational residential in 1997, and in 2005 it became a member of the Round Square. It was proclaimed the second best school in India in 2013. The school won the prestigious "Kasliwal Trophy" for a record 20 times (1992–2012).

== The College Coat of Arms ==
Coat of arms of the Daly College

Motto – The Sanskrit motto "Gyanamev Shakti" or "Knowledge is power".

Coat of arms – The arms represent the main section of the Central Indian Community Maratha, Rajput, Bundela and Mohammedan. The arms have been devised in great measure from those given to chiefs on the Delhi, banners of 1877.

1st Quarter – 'Tenne' is the nearest Heraldic colour to 'Bhagwa', the colour of Maratha standard and of Saivite devotee: the wings and flame represent the Pawars (Puars of Dewas Junior, Dewas Senior & Dhar), who derived descent from the Parmars, the worldwide Sovereignty of clan being proverbial (Wings), while they were also Aganikulas (Flame), the play of 6 argent and gules gives the well known Holkar banner, while the horse of Khandoba is the emblem, the chief azure is for Scindia, and the cobra is the mark of the house.

2nd Quarter – A Barry of fives is the Pachranga of the Rajputs: the sun representing the Suryavanshis and the moon the Chandravanshis, the flame the Agnivanshis.

3rd Quarter – Green is the Mohammedan colour and the crescent their badge: the tower represents Bhopal and its fort of Fatehgarh, the spear and 'talwar' the Pindari element, and the fish, the Mani Martib- the sacred emblem.

4th Quarter – Purpure or murrey is given to all Bundela Arms, the Chevron 'gutty de sang' refers to the traditional origin from 'bund' a drop, the fort on a hill to the famous Ath-kot of Bundelkhand, and to the Vindhyas whence also (Vyandhyelkhand) they derive their name: Devi Vindhyvasini of Mirzapur is the Tutelary goddess of the clan.

The Daly arms are commemorative of General Sir Henry Daly, from whom the college derives its name. All these symbols of different states are brought together by a common motto 'Gyanameva Shakti'.

The Supporters – On the right a Maratha prince and on the left Rajput Prince. Below the barley refers to Bundelkhand and the poppy to Malwa, thus designating the east and the west of the Region. And the British Lion is seated on top.

== Patrons of the Institution ==
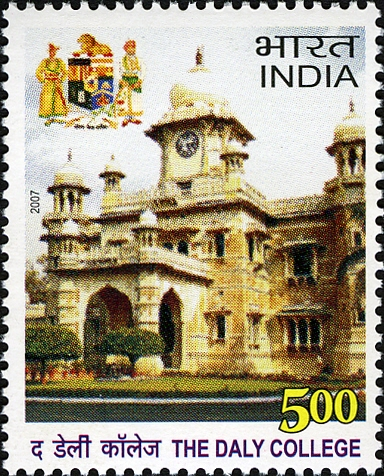
Daly College on a 2007 stamp of India

Honorary

- Freeman Freeman-Thomas, 1st Marquess of Willingdon, Viceroy of India
- Victor Hope, 2nd Marquess of Linlithgow, Viceroy of India
- Archibald Wavell, 1st Earl Wavell, Viceroy of India
- Louis Mountbatten, 1st Earl Mountbatten of Burma, Viceroy of India

Hereditary

- Maharaja Shrimant Sir Jivaji Rao Scindia of Gwalior State
- Maharaja Shrimant Sir Yeshwant Rao II Holkar of Indore (Hokar State)
- Nawab Sir Muhammad Hamidullah Khan of Bhopal
- Maharaja Sir Gulab Singh Baghel Ju Deo, Maharaja of Rewa

(Post-independence)

- Maharaja Shrimant Sir Yeshwant Rao II Holkar of Indore (Holkar State)
- Maharaja Shrimant Madhav Rao II Scindia of Gwalior State
- Nawab-Begum Saleha Sultan of Bhopal
- Maharaja Martand Singh Baghel Ju Deo of Rewa

Alive

Hereditary -

- Maharaja Jyotiraditya Madhavrao Scindia of Gwalior State
- Maharani Usha Devi Holkar of Indore (Hokar State)
- Maharaja Pushpraj Singh Baghel Ju Deo of Rewa

Life -

- Raja Digvijay Singh of Raghogarh (Gwalior State)
- Mukesh Ambani
- Anil Ambani
- Jyotiraditya Scindia

== Presidents of the Board of Governors ==
British Raj

- Charles Hardinge, 1st Baron Hardinge of Penshurst: (1910–1916)
- Frederic Thesiger, 1st Viscount Chelmsford : (1916–1921)
- Rufus Isaacs, 1st Marquess of Reading: (1921–1925)
- Victor Bulwer-Lytton, 2nd Earl of Lytton: (1925–1926)
- Lord Irwin: (1926–1929)
- George Goschen, 2nd Viscount Goschen: (1929–1931).
- Freeman Freeman-Thomas, 1st Marquess of Willingdon: (1931–1933)
- Maharaja Shrimant Sir Yeshwant Rao II Holkar of Indore (Hokar State) : (1933–1940).
- Nawab Sir Muhammad Hamidullah Khan of Bhopal : (1940–1942).
- Maharaja Sir Vir Singh II of Orchha (Tikamgarh) : (1942–1946).

Union of India

- Maharaja Shrimant Sir Vikram Singh Rao Puar of Dewas State [Senior] : (1946–1948).
- Maharaja Shrimant Anand Rao IV Puar of Dhar State : (1948–1949).

Republic of India

- Maharaja Shrimant Sir Yeshwant Rao II Holkar of Indore (Hokar State) : (1949–1955).
- Raja Yashodhar Singh Chauhan of Khilchipur : (1955–1959).
- Maharaja Chhatrapati Sir Shahaji II Bhonsale of Kolhapur State : (1959–1965).
- Maharaja Shrimant Krishnaji Rao III Puar of Dewas State [Senior] : (1965–1968).
- Raja Ajit Singh Rathore of Jhabua : (1968–1971).
- Raja Bhanu Prakash Singh Parmar of Narsingarh : (1971–1980).
- Raja Ajit Singh Rathore, of Jhabua : (1980–1983).
- Rana Surendra Singh Rathore of Alirajpur : (1983–1987).
- Maharaja Shrimant Krishnaji Rao III Puar of Dewas State [Senior] : (1987–1991).
- Thakur Jayendra Singh Jadon of Kathiwada {Honorary} : (1991–1995).
- Maharaja Shrimant Krishnaji Rao III Puar of Dewas State [Senior] : (1995–1997).
- Thakur Narendra Singh Rathore of Bidwal (Dhar State) {Honorary} : (1997–2004).
- Maharaja Shrimant Tukoji Rao IV Puar of Dewas State [Senior] : (2004–2007).
- Raja Narendra Singh Rathore of Jhabua : (2008–2010).
- Maharaja Shrimant Tukoji Rao IV Puar of Dewas State [Senior] : (From 2010 to 2015).
- Maharaja Shrimant Tukoji Rao IV Puar of Dewas State [Senior] : (From 14 June 2015 to 19 June 2015) (re-elected but died).
- Rajmata Shrimant Gayatri Raje Puar of Dewas State [Senior] : (2015–2017)
- Raja Narendra Singh Rathore of Jhabua : (2018–2022).
- Maharaja Shrimant Vikram Singh Rao II Puar of Dewas State [Senior] : (2022–Present)

== Notable alumni ==
- Arun Subhashchandra Yadav
- Deepak Obhrai
- Digvijay Bhonsale
- Digvijaya Singh
- Shahryar Khan
- Pradeep Bhandari
- G. S. Sareen
- Hanumant Singh
- K. M. Cariappa
- Kiran Kumar
- Lakshman Singh
- Martand Singh
- Prabhat Patnaik
- Raj Singh Dungarpur
- Tukoji Rao Pawar
- Vijayendra Ghatge
- Vikram Singh Rao II Puar

== See also ==
- Scindia School, Gwalior
- Mayo College, Ajmer
- Yeshwant Club, Indore

== Bibliography ==
- Foundations of Daly College, Indore [India], by David Michael Litster. Published by Institution of Civil Engineers, 1889.
- Memoirs of General Sir Henry Dermot Daly, G.C.B.C.I.E., Sometime Commander of Central India, by Hugh Daly. Published 1905.
- Report of the working of the Daly college, by Indore Daly college. Published 1916.
- A short history of the Daly College, by Daly College (Indore, India). Published by (s.n.), 1932.
- Colonial childhoods: the juvenile periphery of India, 1850–1945, by Satadru Sen. Anthem Press, 2005. ISBN 1-84331-177-1.
- The Daly Chronicle, Dermot Daly, The Irish Genealogist, volume II, part i, 2002, p. 3 of pp. 3–12.
