= Shahaji II =

Maharaja of Kolhapur from 1947 to 1983

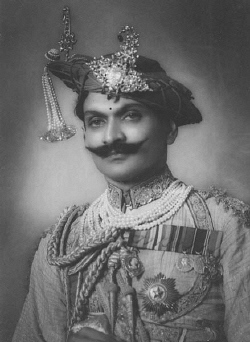

Maharaja of Kolhapur
- Reign: 31 March 1947 – 9 May 1983
- Predecessor: Shivaji V
- Successor: Shahu II

Maharaja of Dewas (Senior)
- Reign: 21 December 1937 – 23 March 1947
- Coronation: 18 March 1938
- Predecessor: Tukojirao III
- Successor: Krishnajirao III
- Born: Vikramsinhrao; 4 April 1910
- Died: 9 May 1983 (aged 73); Bombay, Maharashtra, India
- Spouse: Pramila Raje (m. 1926)
- Issue: Krishnajirao III; Shalini Raje; Vijaya Raje; Urmila Raje; Shahu II
- House: Kolhapur (by adoption); Dewas (by birth)
- Dynasty: Bhonsle (by adoption); Pawar (by birth)
- Father: Tukojirao III
- Mother: Radha Bai
- Religion: Hinduism
- Education: University of Mumbai (BA)

Shahaji II (born Vikramsinhrao; 4 April 1910 – 9 May 1983) was Maharaja of Dewas (Senior) from 21 December 1937 until his abdication on 23 March 1947 and Maharaja of Kolhapur from 31 March 1947 until his death in 1983.

== Early life, family, and education ==
Shahaji was born on 4 April 1910 as Vikramsinhrao to Tukojirao III, the Maharaja of Dewas (Senior), and his wife, Radha Bai. His mother was the only daughter of Shahu, the Maharaja of Kolhapur. His family and close friends called him Nana Sahib, and as a child his guardians nicknamed him Vikky. He spent his early childhood between Dewas and Kolhapur. From the age of six onwards, he lived firstly with Malcolm L. Darling and then with P. E. Richards. He was educated privately and passed his matriculation in 1924 and his intermediate in 1926. Following that, he was educated at Christian College in Indore and at Rajaram College in Kolhapur. He passed the Bachelor of Arts examination of the University of Mumbai in 1932. He received his military training at O.T.C. in Indore and O.T.S. in Mhow. He married on 30 December 1926 to Pramila Raje, a daughter of Ramrao II Amritrao of Jath. By her, he had a son, Krishnajirao III, and three daughters: Shalini Raje, Vijaya Raje, and Urmila Raje. When his father moved to Pondicherry in 1933, the Government of India placed the administration of Dewas (Senior) in his hands on 26 July 1934, and from that date onwards until 21 December 1937 he continued to administer the affairs of the state as the President of the State Council. On 28 June 1962, he adopted Dilipsinh, eldest son of his daughter Shalini Raje and Rajaramsinhrao Bhonsle of Nagpur, as his heir and to succeed him in Kolhapur in due course of time. Upon adoption, Dilipsinh was renamed as Shahu II.

== Reign in Dewas (Senior) ==
Upon the death of his father on 21 December 1937, he immediately became the Maharaja of Dewas (Senior). However, it was not until 18 March 1938 that his coronation was performed. In 1939, he announced some constitutional reforms for the state. Due to the outbreak of World War II, these reforms were never introduced until February 1947, when he introduced a new constitution for the state which contemplated an elected assembly of thirty-two members. By this constitution, it was required of elected members to send three from among them to be members of the council of ministers of state.

He abdicated the throne of Dewas (Senior) on 23 March 1947 in favour of his son Krishnajirao III, and his abdication was approved by the then Viceroy and Governor-General of India.

== Regent of Indore ==
When Yashwant Rao Holkar II had to go to United States in 1942 for medical treatment, he requested him to oversee the administration of Indore in his stead. He accepted Maharaja Holkar’s request and continued to administer Indore affairs with complete administrative powers for a period of seven months until May 1943, when he relinquished the chargé d’affaires. While he remained in Indore, he served as President of the State's Council and Commander-in-Chief of the State Forces.

== Military career ==
Following completion of his military training, he went on active service during World War II. He was attached to the 2/5th Marathas in the Middle East. He undertook a trip on 23 January 1945 to visit the Central Mediterranean Indian Forces, especially Mahratta forces fighting on the Italian Front, and returned on 24 February 1945 after visiting units serving in Iraq and the Middle East. He was appointed a Major in the British Indian Army and the aide-de-camp to George VI in 1946, and was gazetted as an honorary Major-General of the Indian Army in 1962.

== Reign in Kolhapur ==
When Shivaji V died on 28 September 1946, he laid claim to the throne of Kolhapur which had become vacant. Tara Bai accordingly adopted him on 23 March 1947 as Shahaji II and requested the then Viceroy and Governor-General of India to approve this adoption. Her request was approved by the Viceroy in consultation with the Secretary of State for India, and Shahaji was recognised by him on behalf of George VI as the Maharaja of Kolhapur with effect from 31 March 1947. On 10 August 1947, he wrote to Vallabhbhai Patel that he was willing to accede to the Dominion of India on defence, external affairs, and communications, and asked him to issue a public statement that accession would not have financial liability to him or his state, and similarly for other rulers. Patel replied to Shahaji on 14 August 1947 and confirmed that his accession would not have any financial liability but declined to issue a public statement in this regard, and instead asked Shahaji to consider his letter as a guarantee of that. On 11 August 1947, he wrote a letter to Lord Mountbatten and through it informed him that he had decided to accede his state to the Dominion of India, and requested him to issue a formal clarification that his accession would involve no financial obligations, i.e., that in the future authorities would not misinterpret the instrument of accession to impose on him a duty to fund the Dominion's functions in the transferred subjects. But Mountbatten told him he could not promise him that. He signed a merger agreement on 1 March 1949, and by it he merged Kolhapur with Bombay. On 6 September 1970, he ceased to be recognised as the ruler of Kolhapur by the Government of India, after an order was issued in this regard by the then President of India.

== Death ==
He died on 9 May 1983 and was succeeded by Shahu II as the Maharaja of Kolhapur.

== Personal interests ==
Shahaji was an avid reader of books on wildlife, warfare and the history of the Marathas. His patronage of research into Maratha history led to the publication of a number of books. Shahaji was an excellent sportsman. He was an accomplished horse rider and a frequent player of tent-pegging and pig-sticking. Apart from playing, he used to avidly patronise the sports and was a patron of the Kolhapur Sports Association. Shahaji was also a patron of kushti and when he saw K. D. Jadhav win a wrestling tournament at Raja Ram College, he sponsored Jadhav’s trip to London for the 1948 Summer Olympics. He frequently took part in tiger hunting and had shot over a hundred of them; apart from them, he had also shot a number of other animals. In 1961, he undertook a safari to East Africa and that same year, with his wife Pramila, toured the world.

He donated his private property worth INR 60,00,000 to institute trusts for the patronage of sports and education.

== Titles, styles, and honours ==
=== Titles and styles ===
Shahaji held numerous titles throughout his life. Each is listed below; where two dates are shown, the first indicates the date of receiving the title, and the second indicates the date of its loss or renunciation:

- 4 April 1910 – 21 December 1937: Yuvaraj Shrimant Vikramsinhrao Tukojirao Maharaj Puar of Dewas (Senior)
- 21 December 1937 – 23 March 1947: His Highness Kshatriya Kulavatana Sapta Sahasra Senapati Pratinidhi Meherban Shrimant Maharaja Vikramsinhrao Tukojirao Puar, Maharaja of Dewas (Senior)
- 31 March 1947 – 9 May 1983: His Highness Kshatriya-Kulawatasana Sinhasana-dhishwar Shrimant Rajashri Shahaji II Chhatrapati Maharaj Sahib Bahadur, Maharaja of Kolhapur

=== Honours ===
For his services to Indore, he was invested with the Order of Ahilya Holkar Sultanat. He was created Knight Commander of the Order of the Star of India on 3 October 1941 and was made its Knight Grand Commander in 1947.

== See also ==
- Maratha Empire
- List of Maratha dynasties and states
- List of Indian princely states
- Krishnajirao III
- Tukojirao IV
- Vikram Singh Rao II Puar
- Dhar State

Shahaji II Bhonsle Born: 4 April 1910 Died: 9 May 1983
Regnal titles
Preceded by Shivaji V	Maharaja of Kolhapur; 1947–1983	Succeeded by Shahu II
Preceded by Tukojirao III	Maharaja of Dewas (Senior); 1937–1947	Succeeded by Krishnajirao III
