= Dewas =

- City
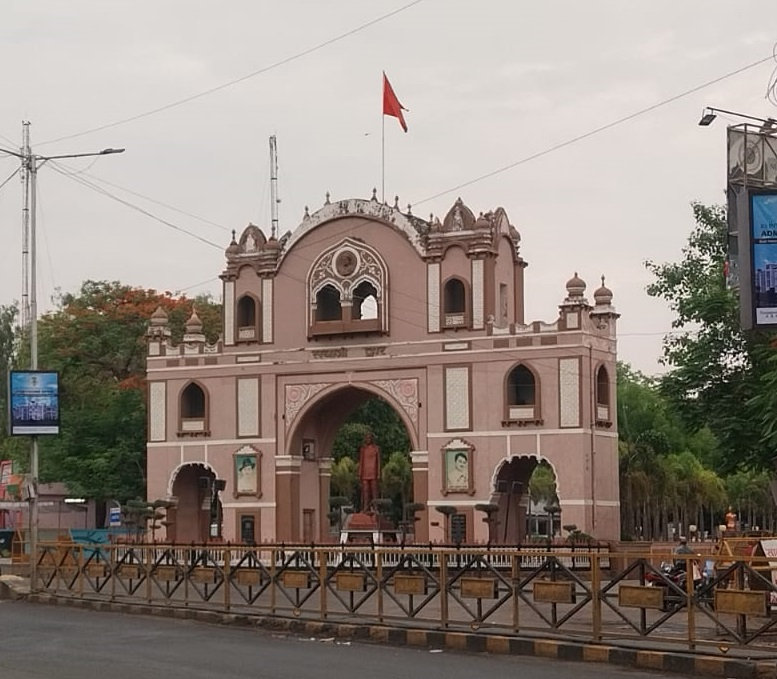
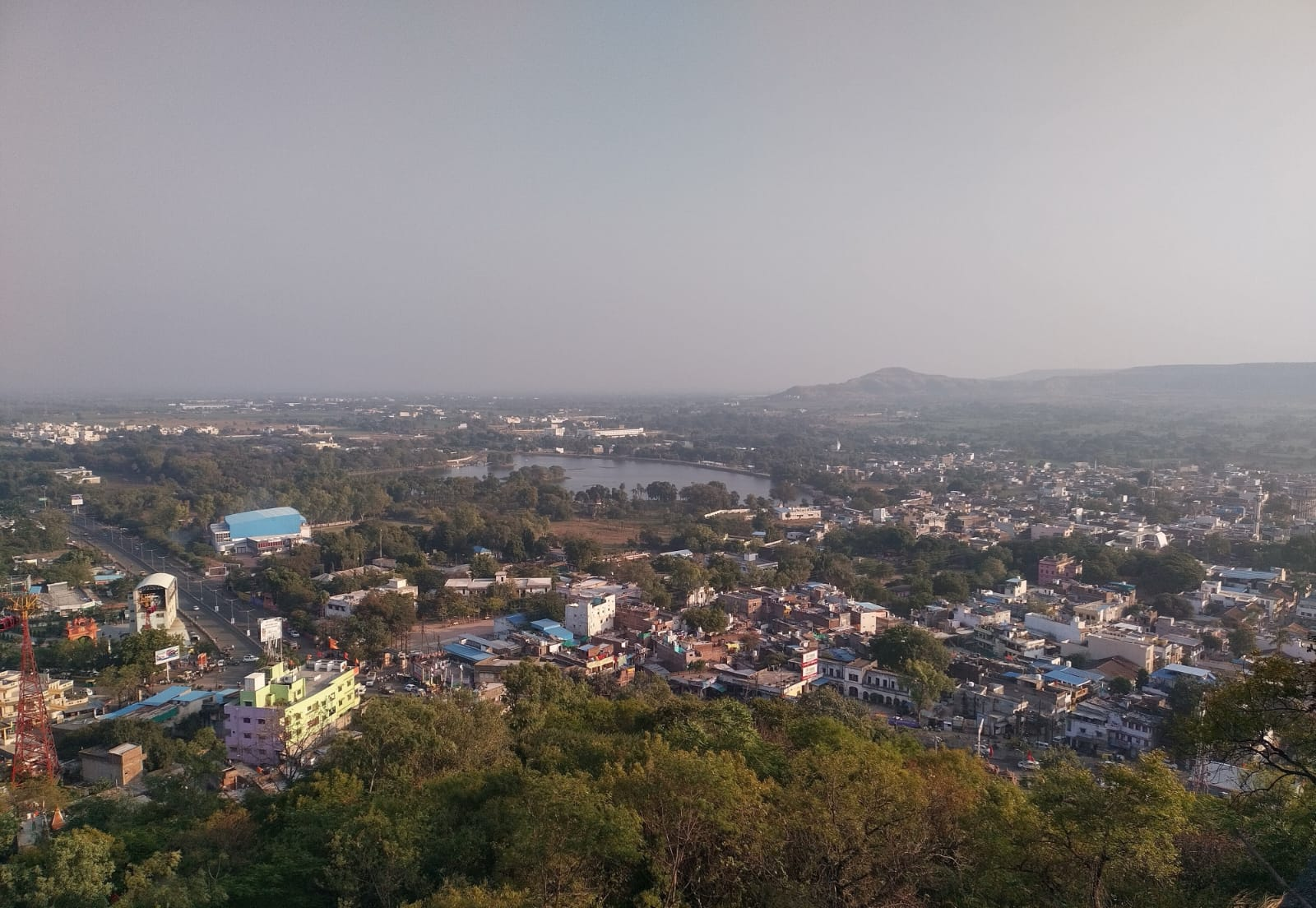
- Sayaji-Dwar, Dewas Dewas City View From Tekri Hilltop

- Location within Madhya Pradesh Location within India
- Coordinates: 22.96°N 76.06°E
- Country: India
- State: Madhya Pradesh
- District: Dewas
- Tehsil: Dewas

Government
  - Type: Municipal Corporation
  - Body: Dewas Municipal Corporation

Area
  - Total: 50 km^{2} (19 sq mi)
  - Rank: 900th
- Elevation: 535 m (1,755 ft)

Population (2011)
  - Total: 289,550
  - Rank: 6th (in Madhya Pradesh)
  - Density: 5,800/km^{2} (15,000/sq mi)
- Demonym: Dewasi

Language
  - Official: Hindi
- Time zone: UTC+5:30 (IST)
- PIN: 455001 to 455005
- Telephone code: 91-(0)727
- ISO 3166 code: MP-IN
- Vehicle registration: MP-41
- Website: dewas.nic.in

Dewas is a city in the Malwa region of the Indian state of Madhya Pradesh. The municipality was formerly the seat of two 15-Gun Salute state princely states during the British Raj, Dewas Junior state and Dewas Senior state, ruled by the Pawar clan of the Marathas. The city is the administrative capital of Dewas district. Dewas is an industrialised city and houses a government bank note press.

== Etymology ==
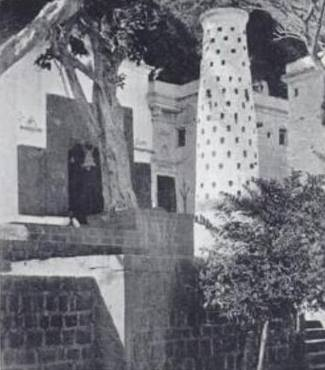
A 1931 photograph of Chamunda Mata's temple on Dewas Tekri (Hill).

The name Dewas is derived from the Devi Vashini hill in the city, commonly known as Tekri. The hill has a temple of the deities Devi Tulja Bhawani, Chamunda Mata and Kalika Mata. The word Dewas is believed to be a sandhi of the words Dev (deity) and Vas (abode in Marathi), so Dewas means abode of the gods. Swami Shivom Tirtha wrote the history of the hill (Tekri ) of Dewas in his book, Sadhan Shikhar. Inspired by the area, E.M. Forster wrote The Hill of Devi in 1953.

== History ==
Dewas was originally established as a sovereign Maratha territory in the first half of the 18th century. While it later became the capital of two princely states during the British era, its foundations were laid by the brothers Tukoji Rao (Senior) and Jivaji Rao (Junior) of the Pawar clan. The Pawar dynasty of Dewas emerged as a prominent military power during the expansion of the Maratha Empire. Members of the clan served with distinction as early as the reign of Chhatrapati Shivaji Maharaj, participating in the foundational battles for Swarajya. Their role grew significantly under Chhatrapati Shahu, during which they fought in numerous campaigns against the Nizams , Mughals and the Portuguese on the western coast. In recognition of their unwavering loyalty and valor in these conflicts, the family was honored with the hereditary titles 'Sena Sapt Sahasri' (Commander of Seven Thousand) and 'Vishwas Rao' (The Trustworthy).

In 1901, the senior branch had an area of 446 sq mi (1,160 km^{2}) and a population of 62,312, while the area of the junior branch was 440 sq mi (1,100 km^{2}) and had a population of 54,904. Both Dewas states were in the Malwa Agency of the Central India Agency.

Dewas Junior and Dewas Senior durbars (courts) were composed of Sardars, Mankaris, Istamuradars, Thakurs and Jagirdars.

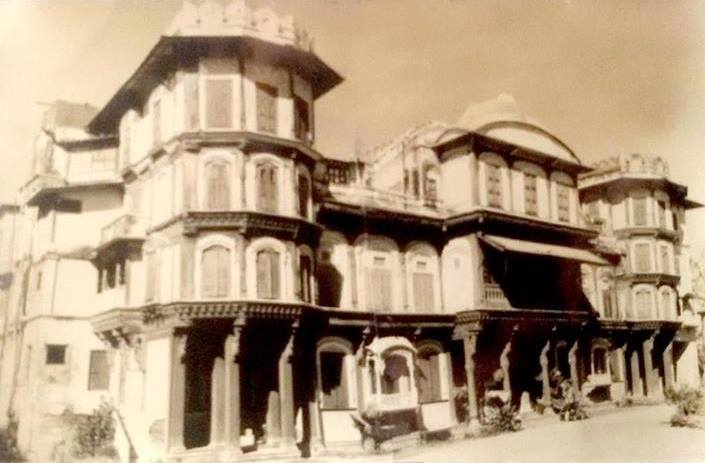
The Old Palace (Rajwada) of Dewas Junior.

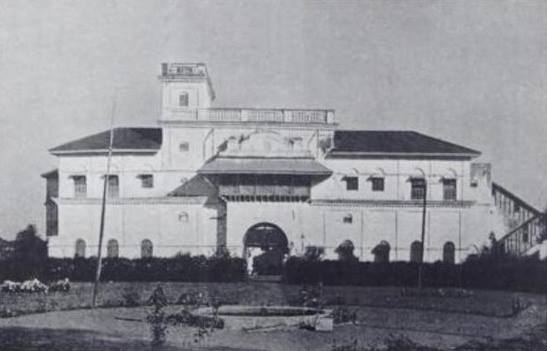
The Durga Bagh Palace, Dewas Junior State.

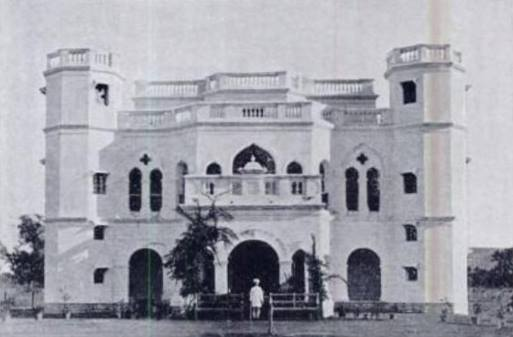
Shree Lakshmi Narayan Bhawan Club, Dewas Junior State.

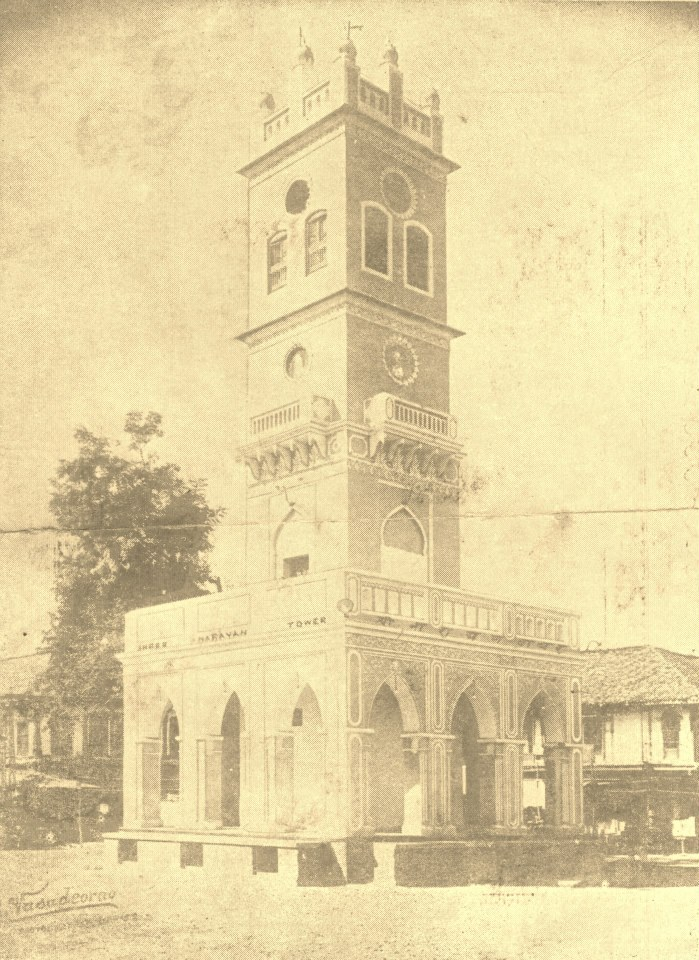
Shree Narayan Tower, Dewas Junior State. The Clock Tower is named after HH Raja Srimant Narayanrao (Dada Sahib) Puar of Dewas Junior State.

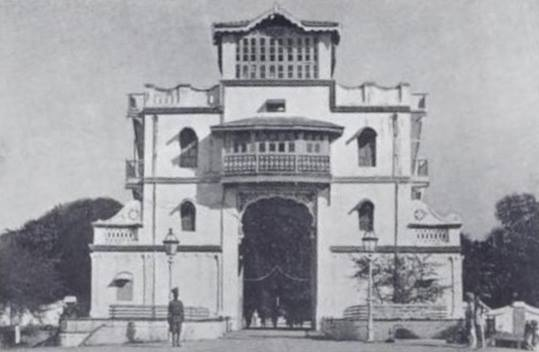
The Gate at Shree Malhar, The Residence of His Holiness Shri Shilnath Maharaj.

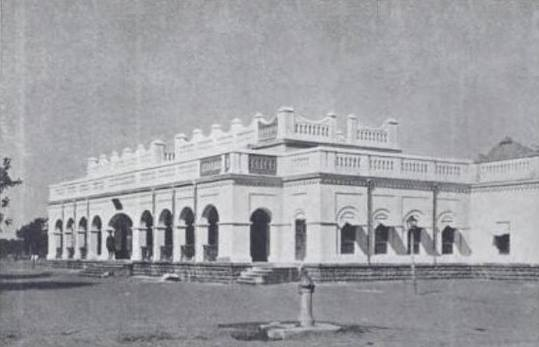
The Law Courts, Dewas Junior State.

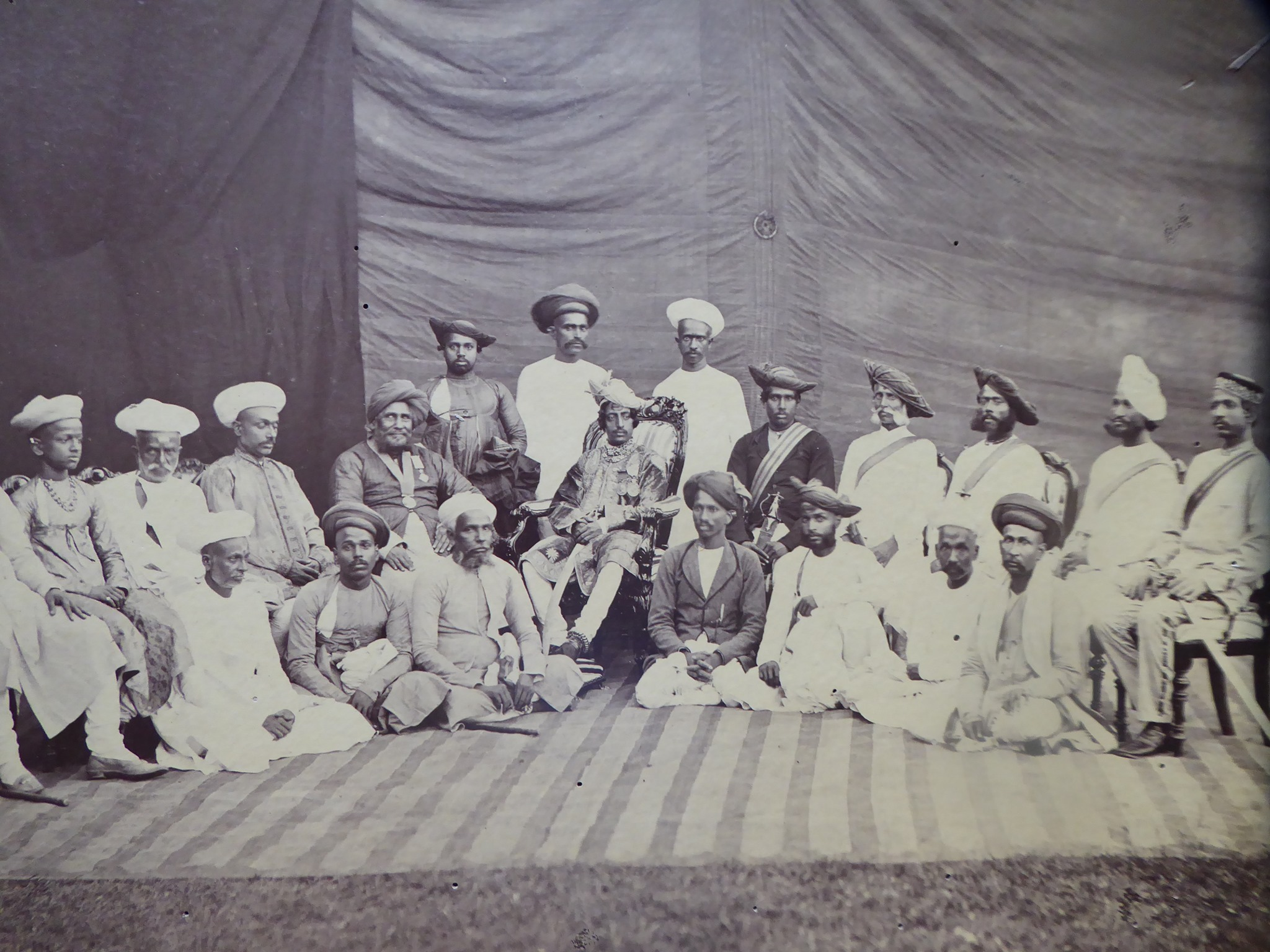
HH Raja Narayan Rao Pawar with Dewas Junior Nobility (Sardars, Mankaris, Thakurs and Jagirdars).

After India's independence in 1947, the Maharajas of Dewas (Jr. & Sr.) acceded to India, and their states were integrated into Madhya Bharat, which became a state of India in 1950. Later, in 1956, Madhya Bharat was merged into the state of Madhya Pradesh.

== Geography ==
Dewas lies northeast of Indore, southeast of Ujjain, and southwest of Shajapur. The city is located on the level plains of the Malwa plateau; to the south, the land rises gently to the Vindhya Range, which is the source of the Chambal and Kali Sindh rivers that flow north through the district on their way to the Ganges. The main river in Dewas is Kshipra.

Climate data for Dewas
Month	Jan	Feb	Mar	Apr	May	Jun	Jul	Aug	Sep	Oct	Nov	Dec	Year
Record high °C (°F)	26.5 (79.7)	29.3 (84.7)	34 (93)	38.1 (100.6)	40.4 (104.7)	36.3 (97.3)	29.7 (85.5)	28.5 (83.3)	29.7 (85.5)	31.7 (89.1)	29.3 (84.7)	27.1 (80.8)	40.4 (104.7)
Daily mean °C (°F)	18.3 (64.9)	20.5 (68.9)	25.1 (77.2)	29.7 (85.5)	33 (91)	30.6 (87.1)	26.3 (79.3)	25.4 (77.7)	25.6 (78.1)	24.7 (76.5)	21 (70)	18.7 (65.7)	24.9 (76.8)
Record low °C (°F)	10.2 (50.4)	11.8 (53.2)	16.2 (61.2)	21.3 (70.3)	25.6 (78.1)	24.9 (76.8)	22.9 (73.2)	22.3 (72.1)	21.5 (70.7)	17.7 (63.9)	12.7 (54.9)	10.4 (50.7)	10.2 (50.4)
Average rainfall mm (inches)	9 (0.4)	2 (0.1)	7 (0.3)	3 (0.1)	7 (0.3)	122 (4.8)	327 (12.9)	274 (10.8)	240 (9.4)	30 (1.2)	13 (0.5)	5 (0.2)	1,039 (41)
Source: climate-data.org

== Demographics ==
Religion in Dewas city (2011)
Religion	Percent
Hinduism	77.98%
Islam	19.98%
Jainism	0.92%
Christianity	0.49%
Sikhism	0.43%
Other or not stated	0.20%

As of the census, Dewas had a total population of 289,550, of which 150,081 were males and 139,469 were females. Population within the age group of 0 to 6 years was 35,437. The total number of literates in Dewas was 215,088, which constituted 74.3% of the population with male literacy of 79.9% and female literacy of 68.3%. The effective literacy rate of 7+ population of Dewas was 84.6%, of which male literacy rate was 91.1% and female literacy rate was 77.7%. The Scheduled Castes population was 56,366, while the Scheduled Tribes population was 9,861. Dewas had 57,397 households in 2011.

Languages of Dewas (2011)
1. Hindi (76.6%)
2. Malvi (10.4%)
3. Urdu (5.82%)
4. Marathi (3.41%)
5. Others (3.79%)

== Administration ==
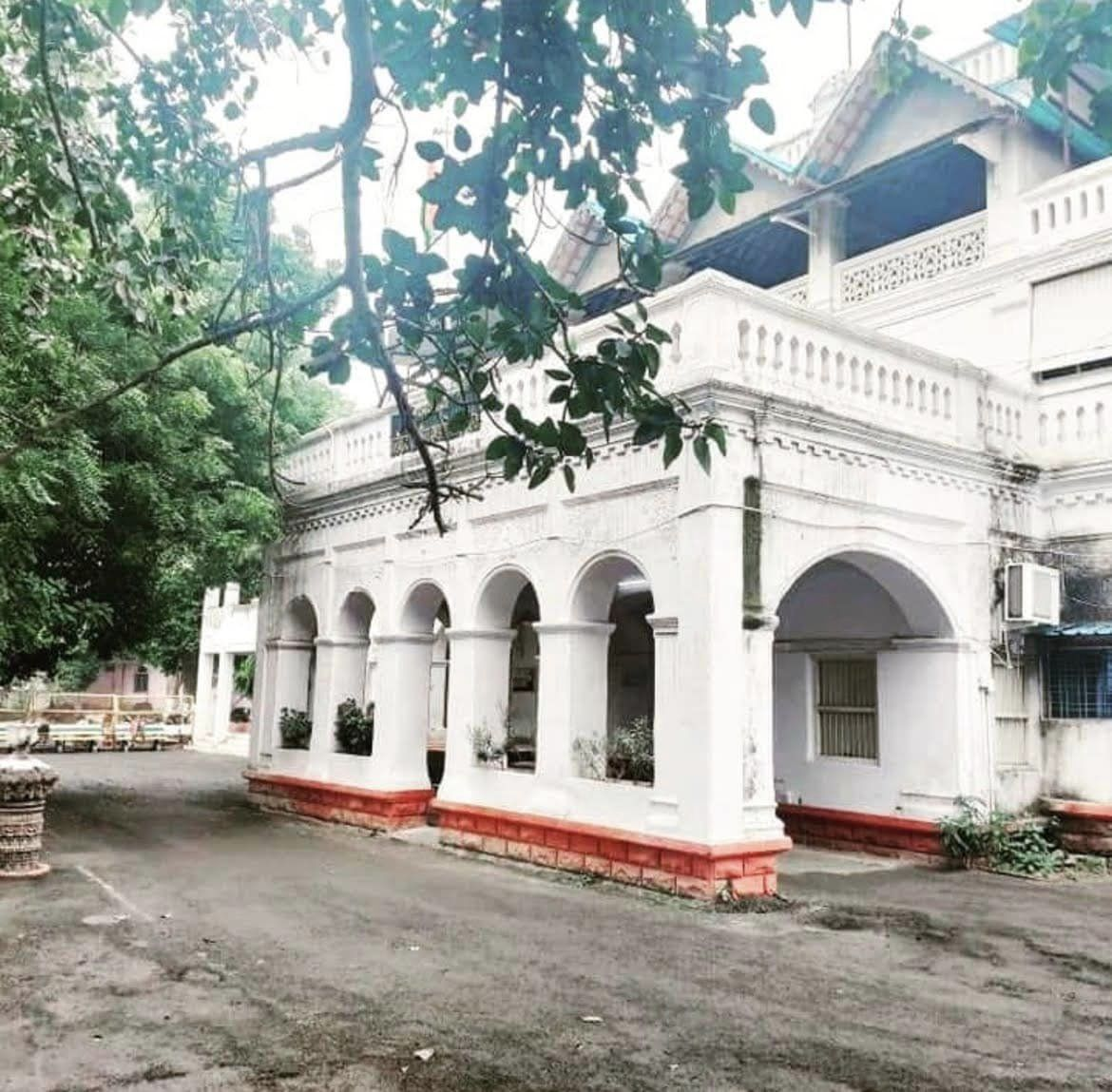
Dewas Collectorate (originally known as Lakshmi Niwas Palace of Dewas Junior)

The Member of Parliament from Dewas was Mahendra Singh Solanki of BJP as of the Lok Sabha Election 2019. As of the 2018 Madhya Pradesh Legislative Assembly election, the member of the Legislative Assembly for Dewas was Gayatri Raje Pawar.

== Awards ==
Dewas placed first nationwide out of 820 cities in the Swachh Survekshan 2024-2025 cleanliness rankings, in the category of Medium Cities (population of 50,000–300,000) and won the Presidential Award for it.

== Notable people ==
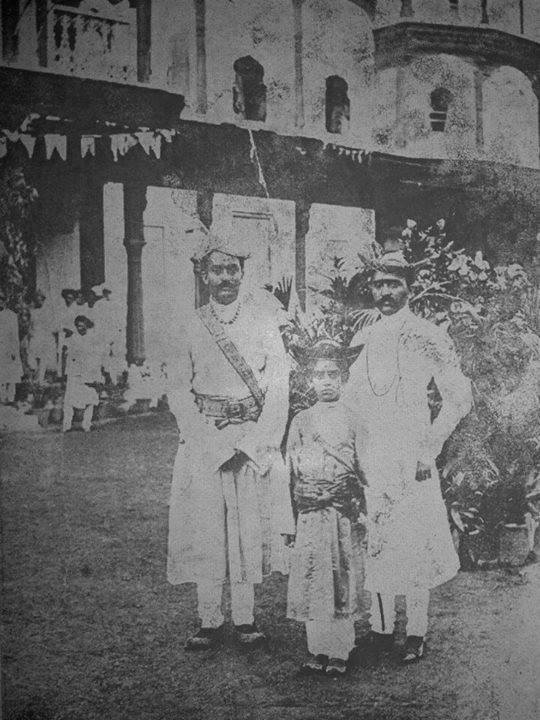
3 successive Maharajas of Dewas Junior State. (L-R: Sadashiv Rao Puar, Yeshwant Rao Puar, Malhar Rao Puar)

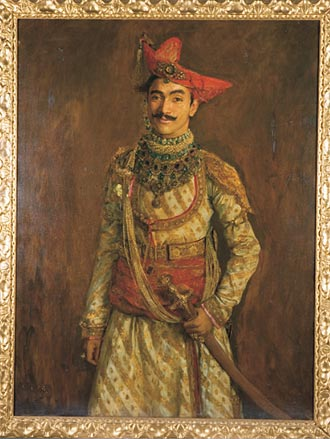
Maharaja Tukoji Rao III Puar of Dewas Senior
- Tukoji Rao III Puar, (Ruler of Dewas Senior State)
- Vikramsinh Rao I Puar, (Ruler of Dewas Senior State)
- Krishnaji Rao III Puar, (Ruler of Dewas Senior State)
- Tukoji Rao IV Puar, (Politician)
- Vikram Singh Rao II Puar, (Politician)
- Edward Morgan Forster, (English Author based in Dewas Senior State, who wrote 'Hill of Devi')
- Madhav Vinayak Kibe, (Statesman & Dewan of Dewas Junior State)
- Kumar Gandharva, (Indian Classical Singer)
- Digvijay Bhonsale, (Rock/Metal Musician)
- Neha Hinge, (Model & Actress)
- Anant Sadashiv Patwardhan, (Politician)
- Mukul Shivputra, (Indian Classical Singer)
- Kailash Chandra Joshi, (Politician)
- Sajjan Singh Verma, (Politician)
- Deepak Joshi, (Politician)
- Manoj Choudhary, (Politician)
- Tejsingh Sendhav, (Politician)
- Manohar Untwal, (Politician)
- Rajendrasingh Baghel, (Politician)
- Hukam Chand Kachwai, (Politician)
- Mahendra Solanki, (Politician)
- Ashif Shaikh, (Social Worker)
- Mishrilal Gangwal, (Politician)
- Bapulal Kishan, (Politician)

== See also ==
- Maratha Empire
- List of Maratha dynasties and states
