= Tukoji Rao Pawar =

Indian politician

Member of Madhya Pradesh Legislative Assembly
- In office 1990 – 2015
- Preceded by: Chandra Prabash Shekhar
- Succeeded by: Gayatri Raje Pawar
- Constituency: Dewas

Personal details
- Born: 17 November 1963
- Died: 19 June 2015 (aged 51)
- Party: Bharatiya Janata Party
- Spouse: Gayatri Raje Pawar
- Children: Vikram Singh Rao II Puar

Shrimant Tukoji Rao IV Pawar (17 November 1963 – 19 June 2015) was an Indian politician belonging to the Bharatiya Janata Party (BJP). Mr. Pawar was member of the Legislative Assembly of Madhya Pradesh.

He was a descendant of the Pawar dynasty of the Marathas. His father Krishnajirao III was the last ruler of Dewas (Senior) State which was a '15 Gun Salute' princely state in India. He was the titular Maharaja of Dewas (Senior) State until 1971 when in the 26th amendment to the Constitution of India promulgated in 1971, the Government of India abolished all official symbols of princely India, including titles, privileges, and remuneration (privy purses).

He was the Member of Legislative Assembly from Dewas for six terms from 1990 to 2015. He was inducted in the state cabinet for two terms serving as Minister for Higher Education, Technical Education and later Tourism, Sports and Youth Welfare. He was elected as the President of the Board of Governors of The Daly College, Indore in 2004, again in 2005, in 2010 and in 2015. His wife Gayatri Raje Pawar has been representing the assembly seat since his death.

He died in 2015 of brain haemorrhage. Vikram Singh Rao II Pawar is his son.

== See also ==
- Maratha Empire
- List of Maratha dynasties and states
- List of Indian princely states
- Shahaji II
- Tukojirao III
- Dewas Senior
- Dewas Junior
- Dhar State
- Hemendra Singh Rao Pawar of Dhar State

Tukoji Rao Pawar Puar Dynasty Born: 17 Nov 1963 Died: 19 June 2015
Titles in pretence
Preceded by Krishnajirao III	— TITULAR — Maharaja of Dewas (senior); 1999-2015; Reason for succession failure: Monarchy abolished in 1948	Succeeded by Vikram Singh Rao II Puar
