= Dewas State =

1728–1948 territory of two Maratha princely states in India

Coordinates: 22.96°N 76.06°E

Dewas State देवास छोटी पाती रियासत
- 1728–1948
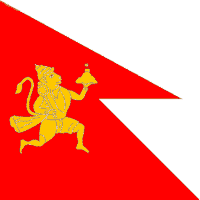
- Flag

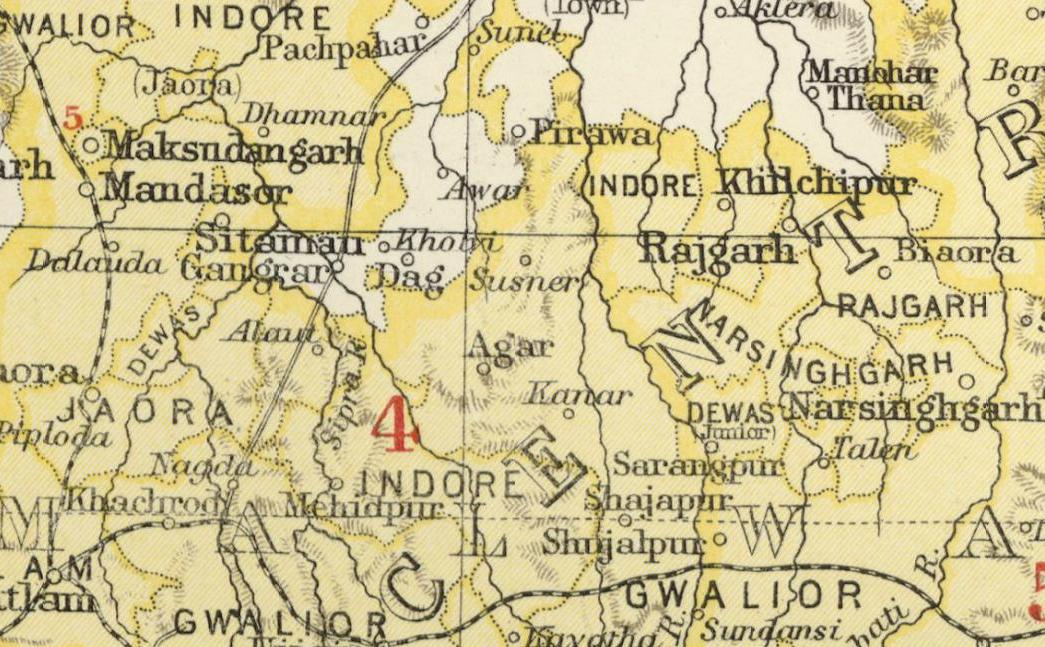
- Dewas Senior and Dewas Junior states in the Imperial Gazetteer of India
- Area
  - 1901: 2,260 km^{2} (870 sq mi)
- Population
  - 1901: 117,216
- History
  - Established: 1728
  - Independence of India: 1948
Preceded by	Succeeded by
Maratha Confederacy	India
- Today part of: India

Dewas State was a territory within Central India, which was the seat of two Maratha princely states during the British Raj. After the Maratha conquest of Central India, Dewas was divided into two states – Dewas Junior ruled by Jivaji Rao ('Dada Saheb') Puar and Dewas Senior ruled by Tukoji Rao ('Baba Saheb') Puar. On 12 December 1818, the two states became British protectorates.

== History ==
=== Foundation and being part of Maratha empire ===
The seats were established in 1728 by two brothers from the Maratha clan Puar, who advanced into Malwa with the Peshwa Baji Rao, and divided the territory among themselves after the Maratha conquest. Their descendants ruled as the senior and junior branches of the family. The Pawar (Puar) clan to which the rulers of Dewas belonged had long been associated with the military and administrative framework of the Maratha state. From the time of Chhatrapati Shivaji Maharaj, members of the Pawar clan served the Maratha polity in important civil, military, and advisory roles, contributing significantly to the expansion and consolidation of Swarajya.

Within the Maratha administrative hierarchy, Pawar nobles are traditionally recorded as holding ranks such as Sena Sapt Sahasri (a senior military commander responsible for troop organization and battlefield command) and Sena Bara Sahasri, a higher military–administrative position entrusted with strategic planning, revenue oversight linked to military needs, and coordination between forts and field armies. The title “Vishwas Rao”was used for trusted nobles and military officers who acted as close confidants of the ruling authority, often entrusted with sensitive diplomatic or military responsibilities.

Pawar clan consistently fought shoulder to shoulder with Maloji Raje Bhosale and later Shahaji Raje Bhosale, participating in campaigns against the Mughal forces, the Nizam of Ahmadnagar, and the Qutb Shahi Sultanate. They continued their service under Chhatrapati Shivaji Maharaj and later Chhatrapati Shahu Maharaj, taking part in Maratha operations against the Portuguese, Mughals, and the Nizam, particularly during campaigns in the Western Deccan, Malwa, and Central India.

With the Maratha expansion into Malwa in 17th century under Peshwa Baji Rao I, Tukoji Rao Pawar and Jivaji Rao Pawar, drawing upon this inherited military tradition, established themselves as powerful regional rulers. Their authority was not merely territorial but rooted in long-standing service to the Maratha state as commanders and administrators of the Chhatrapati and the Peshwa. This continuity of service explains the structured court system of Dewas, where institutions such as Jagirdars, Sardars, Istamuradars, and Mankaris formed the backbone of governance.

=== Princely states under British rule ===
After 1841, each branch ruled his own portion as a separate state, though the lands belonging to each were intimately entangled; in Dewas, the capital town, the two sides of the main street were under different administrations and had different arrangements for water supply and lighting.

The two Rajas heading Dewas states both lived in separate residences in the town of Dewas, and ruled over separate areas.

The Junior branch had an area of 440 sq mi (1,100 km^{2}) and had a population of 54,904 in 1901, while the Senior branch had an area of 446 sq mi (1,160 km^{2}) and a population of in 62,312 in the same year. Both Dewas states were in the Malwa Agency of the Central India Agency.

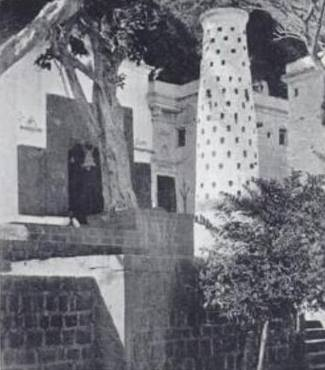
An old photograph of Goddess Chamunda Mata's Temple on Dewas Tekri (Hill).

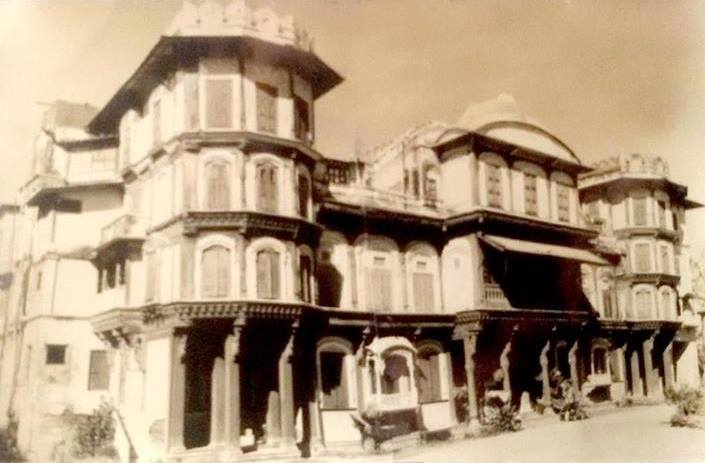
A rare photograph of the Old Palace (Rajwada) of Dewas Junior.

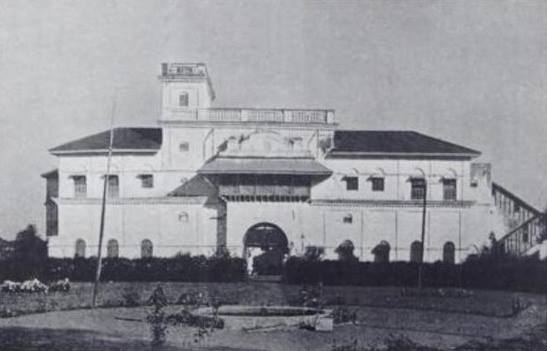
The Durga Bagh Palace, Dewas Junior State.

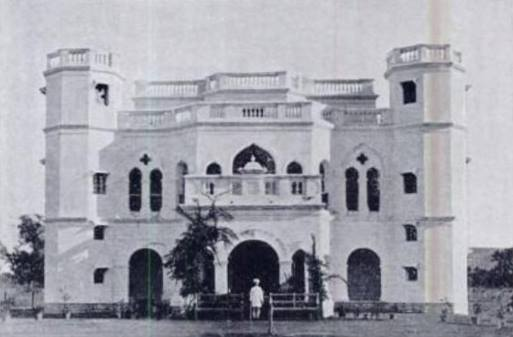
The Shree Lakshmi Narayan Bhawan Club, Dewas Junior State

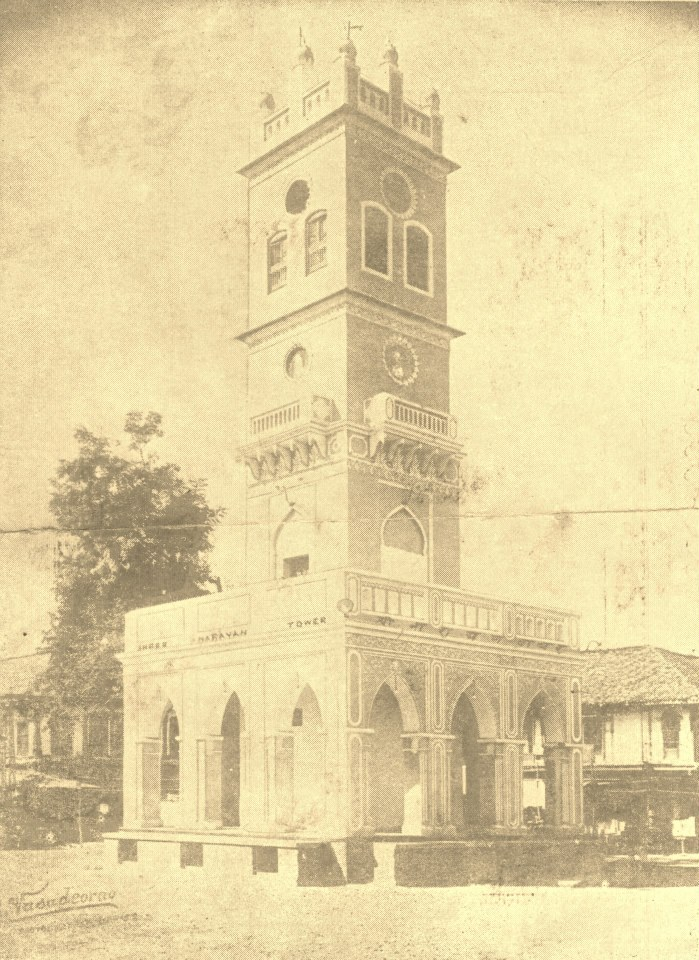
Shree Narayan Tower, Dewas Junior. The Clock Tower is named after HH Raja Srimant Narayanrao (Dada Sahib) Puar of Dewas (Junior).

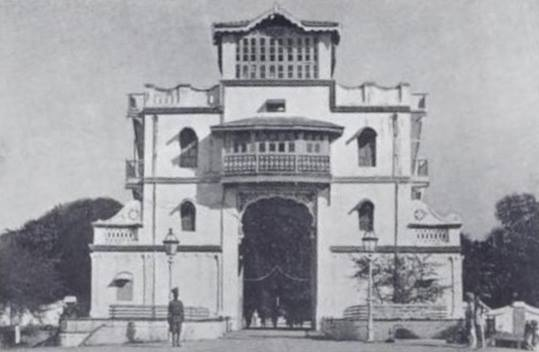
The Gate at Shree Malhar, The Residence of His Holiness Shri Shilnath Maharaj.

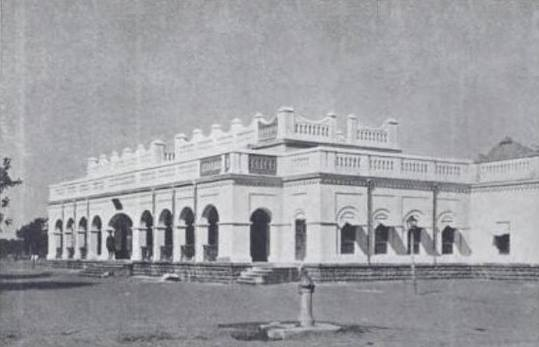
The Law Courts, Dewas Junior State.

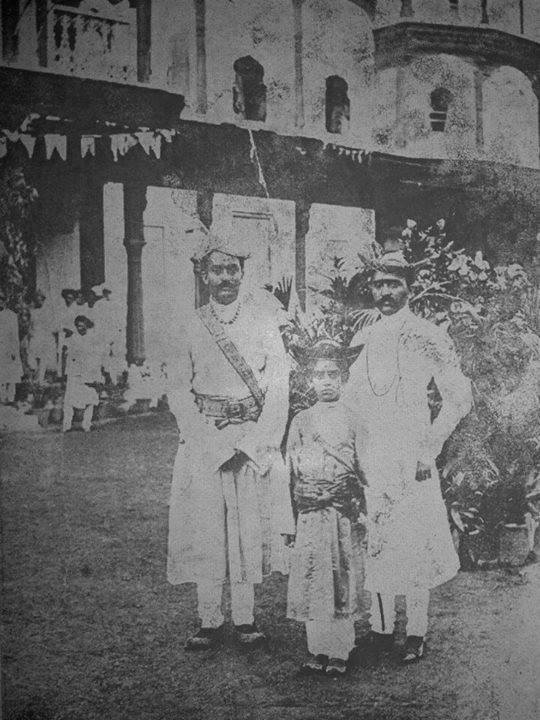
A rare photograph of the 3 successive Maharajas of Dewas Junior State (L to R - HH Maharaja Sadashiv Rao Puar, HH Maharaja Yeshwant Rao Puar and HH Maharaja Malhar Rao Puar).

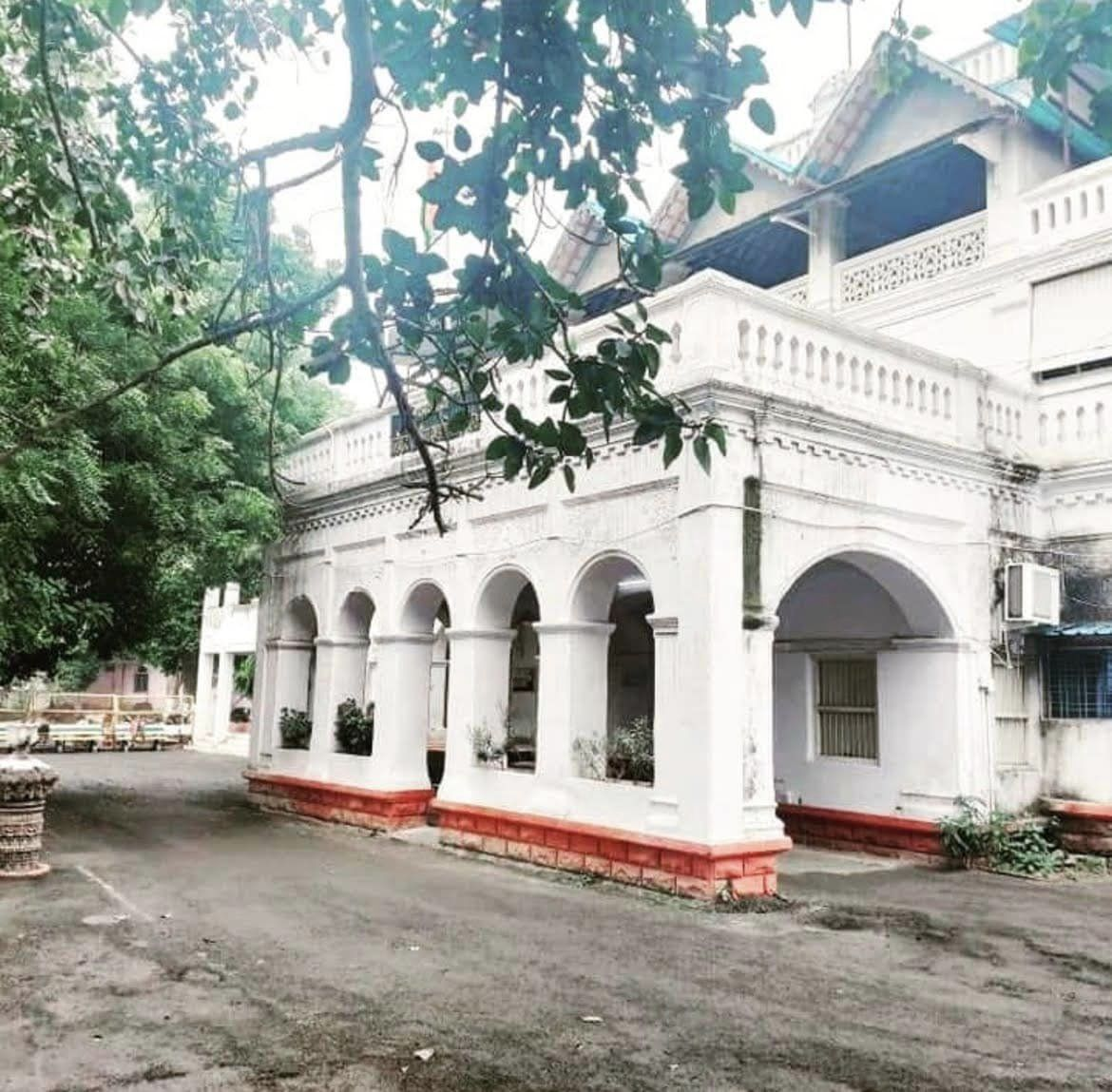
Dewas Collectorate Building (originally known as Lakshmi Niwas Palace of Dewas Junior). This was illegally demolished by the local administration in March 2023, despite an ongoing case and strong opposition by the citizens of Dewas.

Dewas Junior & Senior Darbars (Court) was composed of Sardars, Mankaris, Istamuradars, Thakurs and Jagirdars.

=== Accession to Indian Union ===
After India's independence in 1947, the Maharajas of Dewas acceded to India, and their states were integrated into Madhya Bharat, which became a state of India in 1950. In 1956, Madhya Bharat was merged into Madhya Pradesh state.

== See also ==
Dhar State
