= Krishnajirao III =

Last Maharaja of Dewas State (senior) from 1947–1948

Krishnajirao III (12 May 1932 – 21 January 1999) was an Indian royal, belonging to the Puar dynasty of the Marathas, was the third and last reigning Maharaja of Dewas State (senior), reigning from 23 March 1947 to 27 June 1948.Krishnajirao III Puar was the Maharaja of Dewas State (Senior Branch) from 1947 to 1948. The only son of Sir Vikramsinhrao, Maharaja of Dewas, he was 15 years old when his father abdicated to become Chhatrapati Shahaji II Bhonsle, Maharaja of Kolhapur. As such, he ruled Dewas under the regency of his mother, Maharani Pramilabai (born 4 August 1910) for the brief time between his succession and Indian independence on 15 August 1947. On 27 June 1948, Dewas and other Maratha kingdoms merged to form the Madhya Bharat Union. Derecognised by the Government of India in 1971 as a ruler, he lived a quiet life until his death at the age of 66 on 21 January 1999. He was succeeded by his only son, Tukojirao IV.

== Titles ==
- 1932-1947: Yuvaraja Shrimant Krishnajirao Vikramsinhrao Maharaj Puar
- 1947-1999: His Highness Kshatriya Kulavataunsa Sena Sapta Sahasri Senapati Pratinidhi, Maharaja Shrimant Krishnajirao III Puar, Maharaja of Dewas (Senior)

== Honours ==
- Indian Independence Medal-1947

== See also ==
- Maratha Empire
- List of Maratha dynasties and states
- List of Indian princely states
- Shahaji II
- Tukojirao III
- Dewas State
- Dhar State

Krishnajirao III Puar Dynasty Born: 12 May 1932 Died: 21 January 1999
Regnal titles
Preceded by Vikramsinhrao (as Maharaja of Dewas (senior))	Maharaja of Dewas (senior); 1947-1948	Succeeded by Monarchy abolished succeeded by India
Titles in pretence
Preceded by None	— TITULAR — Maharaja of Dewas (senior); 1948-1999; Reason for succession failure: Monarchy abolished in 1948	Succeeded by Tukojirao IV
