= Tukojirao III =

Maharaja of Dewas from 1900 to 1937

Tukojirao III Pawar
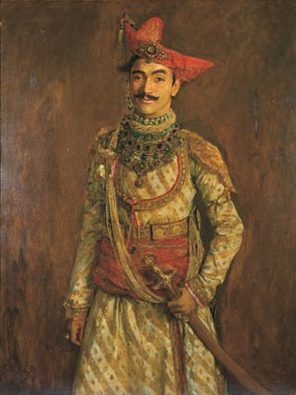
- Portrait of Maharaja Tukoji Rao III Pawar
- Born: Keshavrao Anandrao Pawar; 1 January 1888
- Died: 21 December 1937 (aged 49); Pondicherry
- Title: Maharaja of Dewas Senior princely state
- Children: Vikramsinhrao

Tukojirao III Pawar KCSI (1 January 1888 – 21 December 1937) was the ruling Maharaja of the Maratha princely state of Dewas from 1900 to 1937. He succeeded to the royal throne of Dewas following the death of his uncle, Raja Krishnajirao II. His tutor and guardian from 1907 was Malcolm Lyall Darling.

The first Maharaja of Dewas, he was granted the title by the British Government on his thirtieth birthday in 1918. The novelist E.M. Forster served as his secretary for a period in 1921. In 1934, Tukojirao fled from the British to Pondicherry in French India, leaving his only son Vikramsinhrao to take charge of the state's affairs. He was essentially forced out by the British and taking his wife and daughter he fled to Pondicherry. Before leaving he bequeathed many high value pieces of jewelry, keeping his family afloat before and after his death. He died in exile in Pondicherry three years later at the age of 48, and was succeeded by Vikramsihnrao, who himself exchanged the throne in 1946 to become Chhatrapati Shahaji II Bhonsle, Maharaja of Kolhapur.

== Titles ==
- 1888-1900: Shrimant Keshavrao Anandrao Puar
- 1900-1911: His Highness Kshatriya Kulavatana Sena Sapta Sahasri Senapati Pratinidhi, Raja Shrimant Tukojirao III Puar, Raja of Dewas (Senior)
- 1911-1918: His Highness Kshatriya Kulavatana Sena Sapta Sahasri Senapati Pratinidhi, Raja Shrimant Sir Tukojirao III Puar, Raja of Dewas (Senior), KCSI
- 1918-1937: His Highness Kshatriya Kulavatana Sena Sapta Sahasri Senapati Pratinidhi, Maharaja Shrimant Sir Tukojirao III Puar, Maharaja of Dewas (Senior), KCSI

== Honours ==
- Delhi Durbar Gold Medal-1903
- Delhi Durbar Gold Medal-1911
- Knight Commander of the Order of the Star of India (KCSI)-1911
- King George V Silver Jubilee Medal-1935

== See also ==
- List of Maratha dynasties and states
- List of Indian princely states
- Krishnajirao III
- Tukojirao IV
- Dhar State

== Sources ==
Tukojirao III Puar dynasty Born: 1 January 1888 Died: 21 December 1937
Regnal titles
| Preceded by Krishnajirao II (as Raja of Dewas (senior)) | Raja of Dewas (senior); 1900-1918 | Succeeded by Himself (as Maharaja of Dewas (senior)) |
| Preceded by Himself (as Raja of Dewas (senior)) | Maharaja of Dewas (senior); 1918-1937 | Succeeded by Vikramsinhrao |
