= The Hill of Devi =

1953 book by E.M. Forster

- First edition
- Author: E. M. Forster
- Genre: Memoir
- Publisher: Harcourt Brace
- Publication date: 1953

The Hill of Devi is an account by E. M. Forster of two visits to India in 1912–1913 and 1921, during which he worked as the private secretary to Tukojirao III, the Maharaja of the state of Dewas Senior. The book was first published in 1953 and is dedicated to Forster's friend, the Indian Civil Service administrator Malcolm Lyall Darling with whom he had been a contemporary at King's College, Cambridge as a student.

Forster derived inspiration for the book from Dewas's famous hill-top temple Dewas Tekri of the Hindu Mother Goddess "Devi". The story is based in pre-independence India in an undistinguished kingdom in the central part of the country, Dewas. The book offers an insight into the life of Indian royalty as it skillfully revolves around the internal feud between two scions of the ruling family of Dewas. The 1924 novel A Passage to India could be read along with this book.

The hill is immediately north of the old town in Dewas, at 22.97 degrees north, 76.06 degrees east.
