= Vikram Singh Rao II Puar =

10th Maharaja of Dewas State

Vikram Singh Rao II Pawar (born 3 May 1989), is the present titular and the 10th Maharaja of Dewas Senior . He is a descendant of the Maratha Pawar (Parmara) dynasty. He ascended the 'Gadi' of Dewas Senior as the Maharaja, after the death of his father late HH Maharaja Tukoji Rao IV Pawar at the Anand Bhawan Palace, Dewas. His mother Gayatri Raje Pawar represents Dewas in Madhya Pradesh assembly, having won the election in 2018.

== See also ==
- List of Maratha dynasties and states
- Maratha Empire
- Maratha
- Dhar State
- Dewas Junior
- Dewas Senior
- Dhar State
- Hemendra Singh Rao Pawar
