= Dewas Assembly constituency =

Constituency of the Madhya Pradesh legislative assembly in India

Coordinates: 22.96°N 76.05°E

Dewas
- Constituency No. 171 for the Madhya Pradesh Legislative Assembly

Constituency details
- Country: India
- Region: Central India
- State: Madhya Pradesh
- District: Dewas
- Lok Sabha constituency: Dewas
- Established: 1957
- Reservation: None

Member of Legislative Assembly
- 16th Madhya Pradesh Legislative Assembly
- Incumbent Gayatri Raje Pawar
- Party: Bharatiya Janata Party
- Elected year: 2023
- Preceded by: Tukoji Rao Pawar

Dewas Assembly constituency is one of the 230 Vidhan Sabha (Legislative Assembly) constituencies of Madhya Pradesh state in central India. It is a segment of Dewas (Lok Sabha constituency). Since 1990, the constituency has been continuously held by members of the Dewas (Senior) Royal Family, first Tukoji Rao Pawar and then his wife Gayatri Raje Pawar after his death.

== Members of Legislative Assembly ==
=== Madhya Bharat Legislative Assembly ===
Election	Name	Party
1952	Anant Sadashiv Patwardhan	Indian National Congress
1952	Bapulal Kishan	Indian National Congress

=== Madhya Pradesh Legislative Assembly ===
Year	Member	Party
1957	Bapulal Kishan	Indian National Congress
1957	Anant Sadashiv Patwardhan	Indian National Congress
1962	Bapulal Kishan	Indian National Congress
1967	Hate Singh	Indian National Congress
1972	Dhirajsingh Mohansingh	Indian National Congress
1977	Shankar Kanungo	Janata Party
1980	Chandra Prabash Shekhar	Indian National Congress (Indira)
1985	Chandra Prabash Shekhar	Indian National Congress
1990	Tukoji Rao Pawar	Bharatiya Janata Party
1993	Tukoji Rao Pawar	Bharatiya Janata Party
1998	Tukoji Rao Pawar	Bharatiya Janata Party
2003	Tukoji Rao Pawar	Bharatiya Janata Party
2008	Tukoji Rao Pawar	Bharatiya Janata Party
2013	Tukoji Rao Pawar	Bharatiya Janata Party
2015^	Gayatri Raje Pawar	Bharatiya Janata Party
2018	Gayatri Raje Pawar	Bharatiya Janata Party
2023	Gayatri Raje Pawar	Bharatiya Janata Party

^ denotes bypoll

== Election results ==
=== 2023 ===
2023 Madhya Pradesh Legislative Assembly election: Dewas
Party	Candidate	Votes	%	±%
BJP	Gayatri Raje Pawar	117,422	55.33	+0.26
INC	Pradeep Choudhary	90,466	42.63	+2.46
NOTA	None of the above	1,422	0.67	−0.33
Majority		26,956	12.7	−2.2
Turnout		212,211	75.24	−0.57
BJP hold		Swing		

=== 2018 ===
In December 2018, one news outlet erroneously reported that sitting MLA Gayatri Devi had lost. She was trailing for a long time but managed to turn the tide.

2018 Madhya Pradesh Legislative Assembly election: Dewas
Party	Candidate	Votes	%	±%
BJP	Gayatri Raje Pawar	103,456	55.07	
INC	Thakur Jaysingh	75,469	40.17	
Independent	Dilip Bangar	2,362	1.26	
BSP	Shaikh Qutubuddin	1,827	0.97	
NOTA	None of the above	1,871	1.0	
Majority		27,987	14.9	
Turnout		187,874	75.81	
BJP hold		Swing		

=== 1962 ===
- Bapulal (INC): 10,708 votes
- Nand Ram (Jana Sangh): 5,695

== See also ==
- Dewas
- Dewas (Lok Sabha constituency)
