= Malcolm Lyall Darling =

Member of the Indian Civil Service (1880-1969)

Malcolm Lyall Darling, a 1942 photo by Walter Stoneman

Sir Malcolm Lyall Darling KCIE (10 December 1880 – 1 January 1969) was a member of the Indian Civil Service (ICS) who was appointed Assistant Commissioner of the Punjab, British India, in 1904. Having held numerous other posts, he became Financial Commissioner of the same province in 1936 and retired from the ICS in 1940. Thereafter, he was engaged in various roles, including as chairman of the Horace Plunkett Foundation, and was for some time head of the BBC India Section.

Recognised as something of a maverick in comparison to most of his colleagues in India, Darling sought to improve the life of rural villagers and was an expert on the subject of peasant agriculture. He wrote several books, including some that are considered to be classic studies and which have been republished with introductions from academic writers in the 21st century.

== Early life ==
Malcolm Lyall Darling was born on 10 December 1880 into a wealthy literary family. His parents were the Reverend Thomas Darling, the Rector of the church of St Michael Paternoster Royal in London, and Mildred, née Ford, whose father, Richard, had been president of the Law Society of England and Wales. Alfred Comyn Lyall, who was an administrator in India and literary figure, was his uncle, guardian and a significant influence on his humanist education. He was educated at Eton College and King's College, Cambridge, prior to joining the ICS in 1904 after sitting the competitive examination.

== Career summary ==
Appointed as an Assistant Commissioner, Darling was initially posted to the Punjab. He was a subdivisional officer in Rajanpur in 1906 and then from 1907 was tutor and guardian to the Raja of Dewas State (Senior), Tukojirao III. Darling later wrote about these early years in his book Apprentice to Power, in which it is apparent that his appointment as tutor and guardian to the 19-year old was a stroke of luck that significantly affected his future activities in the country. He learned as much, if not more, from the raja than he taught. It was while acting as tutor that he invited E. M. Forster to India, with whom he had been friends at college in Cambridge. While in Dewas, Forster wrote The Hill of Devi, which he dedicated to Darling, and his stay also inspired much of A Passage to India. Forster noted in the former that Dewas

transformed [Darling]. When he arrived, he had the feeling of racial superiority which was usual among Englishmen at the time. In a few months he lost it, and it never returned.

Somewhat in contradiction to this, Lynn Zastougil sees Darling as preferring Indian society to that of the "conservative, racist opinions" that prevailed in the ICS precisely because of his humanist upbringing, and says that he subsequently became disenchanted with the behaviour of his royal charge.

In 1911, Darling was appointed as an undersecretary in the Political Department before moving to Sirsa in 1913 as a subdivisional officer. He joined the Co-operative Department as an assistant registrar in 1916, working with the new rural co-operative credit movement, and became registrar of co-operative societies in 1927.

In 1930, Darling was appointed to chair a commission of inquiry — the Punjab Banking Inquiry Committee — following a series of banking failures in the province. He became a commissioner in Rawalpindi in 1931 and in 1935 was put on special duties with the Government of India to report on the co-operative movement. He was Finance Commissioner of the Punjab between 1936 and 1939, and acted as chairman of the Punjab Land Revenue Board in 1938. He was twice appointed vice-chancellor of the University of the Punjab, in 1931 and 1937, and in 1934 spent some time in Burma investigating co-operative farming movements.

Upon his retirement from the ICS in 1940, Darling headed the Indian Section of the BBC Eastern Service between 1940 and 1944, where he worked with both Forster and George Orwell. In 1947 he became chairman of the Horace Plunkett Foundation, which was involved with agricultural co-operation, and between 1951 and 1960 he was involved with missions to Egypt, Greece, India, Pakistan and Yugoslavia.

== Work in India ==
Darling, who has been described as a pioneer of community development, was not typical of the ICS administrators in Punjab during his time. A variety of changes, such as understaffing by financial pressures after the World War and an increasing preference by talented people to seek opportunities in Britain rather than abroad, together with political changes in Delhi and London, meant that, according to historian Christopher Harding, "most civil servants in Punjab [were] striving simply to hold the provincial administration together and [were] generally cynical of any grand plans that harked back to the "good old days" of the early Punjab administrators". That was not the case with Darling. Tensions were high because the British authorities were desperately trying to stem the tide of nationalism with piecemeal reforms, and communal disputes between Hindus, Muslims and Sikhs were increasing. In the toxic environment, where the authorities were almost entirely concerned with maintaining law and order, Darling and a colleague, Frank Lugard Brayne, stood out as mavericks for their attempts to improve the conditions in rural villages.

In Darling's case, he was affected by the knowledge of the debt burden that was carried by many peasant farmers, some of whom owed more than 20 times their annual incomes. He believed that the perceived necessity of holding elaborate and expensive celebrations for life events such as birth, circumcision, marriage and death lay at the heart of the indebtedness. Debt was also affected by matters of prestige such as land ownership itself, which caused people to buy tracts that were uneconomic, and the role of Bania moneylenders, who also acted as agents for the payment of taxes and often dealt with those matters, without reference to the peasant. A cycle of increasing debt resulted from heavy interest payments on existing debt, which forced the cash-poor peasant to take on even more debt. The more prosperous the peasant was, the more credit-worthy they were and so the more debt they accrued.

Darling thought that moneylenders were exploiting the situation and that the peasants were particularly exposed to problems should they suffer some natural or personal calamity, with debts sometimes doubling within a space of five years because of interest charges and families potentially being faced with repayments over several generations. He want to expand the co-operative credit facilities to improve the situation as well as to set up courts for arbitration and to introduce measures to increase prosperity without recourse to debt, such as animal breeding centres. He estimated that the number of moneylenders and dependants in Punjab had quadrupled between 1868 and 1911, and the decline in prices for agricultural produce that followed the end of World War I made the repayment of debt even more difficult. He noted that the moneylenders were generally Hindus and the peasants were mostly Muslim, a situation that prevailed despite the intent of the Punjab Land Alienation Act, 1901. His attitude to the moneylenders was not, however, entirely negative: he recognised the significance of their accessibility and the historic good that they had brought to regional development. At the same time, he was criticising their usurious nature, which, he thought, was being implicitly accepted by the unwillingness of the Raj authorities to intervene. His 1925 book, The Punjab Peasant in Prosperity and Debt, is a classic work of research, analysis and prescription, which demonstrated, according to D. N. Dhanagare, that he was "far ahead of his time".

It was while working with the Punjab Banking Inquiry Committee that Darling was able to persuade the introduction of co-operative credit in every village of the province. In 1942, Darling noted that the Raj simply pumping financial resources into Indian agriculture was not an optimal policy. He agreed with Bryce Burt that it was desirable to preserve the way of life while nonetheless encouraging technological progress, but he added that in India

any extra money that is made by improved cultivation tends to pass into the hands of the moneylender, the lawyer, and the factory owner ... It seems to me that the cultivators must be taught to protect themselves, and there is only one way in which that can be done, namely, through education and co-operation. In co-operative societies they have some protection against those who come to the village to exploit them.

While the decline in agricultural prices following World War I was a factor in the debt problems that Darling saw and tried to alleviate, he noted later that it was the rise in those prices during World War II that finally put an end to the necessity of debt among the Punjabi peasantry. He said that

The three hundred per cent rise in prices, which set in sharply in 1942, had put more cash into the peasant's pocket than had ever been there before, and he had wisely used it to pay his debts and redeem his land, and in the canal colonies of the Punjab, where almost every drop of water produced a rupee, to buy land in Bawahalpur, Bikaner or Sind. For the first time for at least two generations, debt was no longer a millstone round the peasant's neck.

Darling tried always to befriend and understand the native population of India and spoke several of their languages. To that end, he made several long-distance tours of the country on horseback. One, in 1946–1947 began in Peshawar and ended, 1,400 miles (2,300 km) later, in Jubbulpore where he visited his friend Mahatma Gandhi. Believing in fair play, he found himself at odds with other British people in India when he denounced Dyer's massacre of civilians at Amritsar in 1919.

== Recognition ==
Lyall was appointed as a Companion of the Order of the Indian Empire in 1934 and as a Knight Commander of the same order in 1939. Having held an Exhibition while a student at King's College, he was elected as an Honorary Fellow of the college in 1957.

== Family ==
Darling married Jessica, daughter of Alexander Low, Lord Low of the Laws, Berwickshire in 1909. The couple had a daughter and two sons. Jessica died in 1932 around the time that Darling was commissioner in Rawalpindi. Darling died on 1 January 1969, aged 88.

== Publications ==
Darling wrote several official reports, including:

- Report on Certain Aspects of Co-operative Movement in India
- Report on Labour Conditions in Agriculture in Pakistan (1955), for the Government of Pakistan

In addition, Darling wrote several books among them some "classic works on the Punjab peasantry", in the opinion of Indivar Kamtekar. Some of these have been republished by Oxford University Press in the 21st century with introductions by academic writers. Among his published books are:

- Some Aspects of Co-operation in Germany, Italy and Ireland (1922)
- The Punjab Peasant In Prosperity And Debt (1925)
- Rusticus Loquitur, or, The Old Light and The New in the Punjab Village (1930)
- Wisdom and Waste in the Punjab Village (1934)
- At Freedom's Door (1949)
- Apprentice to Power: India, 1904–1908 (1966)

His journal articles include:

- Darling, Malcolm (6 August 1943). "The Indian Village and Democracy". Journal of the Royal Society of Arts. 91 (4645): 486–497. JSTOR 41361965.
- Co-operative Farming in Italy (1953)

Darling's wife, Jessica, wrote Love In A Mist, published in 1921.

== See also ==
- Punjab Canal Colonies
