= Hemendra Singh Rao Pawar =

Titular Maharaja of Dhar State from 2015-present

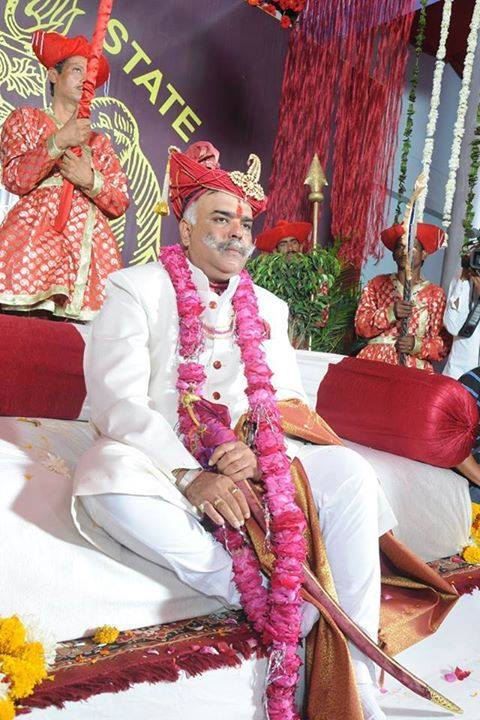
Pawar at his coronation in 2015.

Hemendra Singh Rao Pawar (18 September 1968 - 07 November 2023), was the titular Maharaja of Dhar State. He was a descendant of the Pawar (Puar) dynasty that ruled Dhar State.

He was crowned as the Maharaja of Dhar State on 15 January 2015 at the Dhar Rajwada (Old Palace). The ceremony had last been held on 1 August 1926.

He was married to Shaila Raje Pawar and has a son Prathmeshwar Singh Rao Pawar. He was educated at Daly College, Indore.

He died on 7 November 2023 of cancer.

== See also ==
- List of Maratha dynasties and states
- Maratha Empire
- Maratha
- Dhar State
- Dewas Junior
- Dewas Senior
