= Ashif Shaikh =

Indian activist

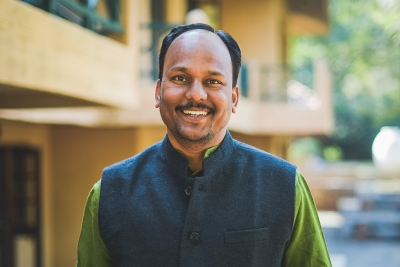
- Ashif Shaikh at Jan Sahas National Office, New Delhi, 2019
- Born: Ashif (Asif) Shaikh; 18 October 1982 (age 43); Dewas, Madhya Pradesh, India
- Years active: 1997–present
- Known for: Rashtriya Garima Abhiyan, Jan Sahas, Maila Mukti Yatra
- Awards: Social Innovator of the year 2020 by World Economic Forum, Star Impact Award (2014)
- Website: jansahas.org dignitymarch.org

Ashif Shaikh (born 18 October 1982) is a social activist from India who has worked for ending sexual violence against women and children, eradication of manual scavenging, forced labour practices and human trafficking in India. He is the founder of Rashtriya Garima Abhiyan (National Campaign for Dignity) and the non profit organisation, Jan Sahas.

== Early life ==
Ashif was born in Dewas in a Dalit Muslim family, Madhya Pradesh and completed his postgraduate education in Political Science from Vikram University, Ujjain.

== Work ==
=== Jan Sahas ===
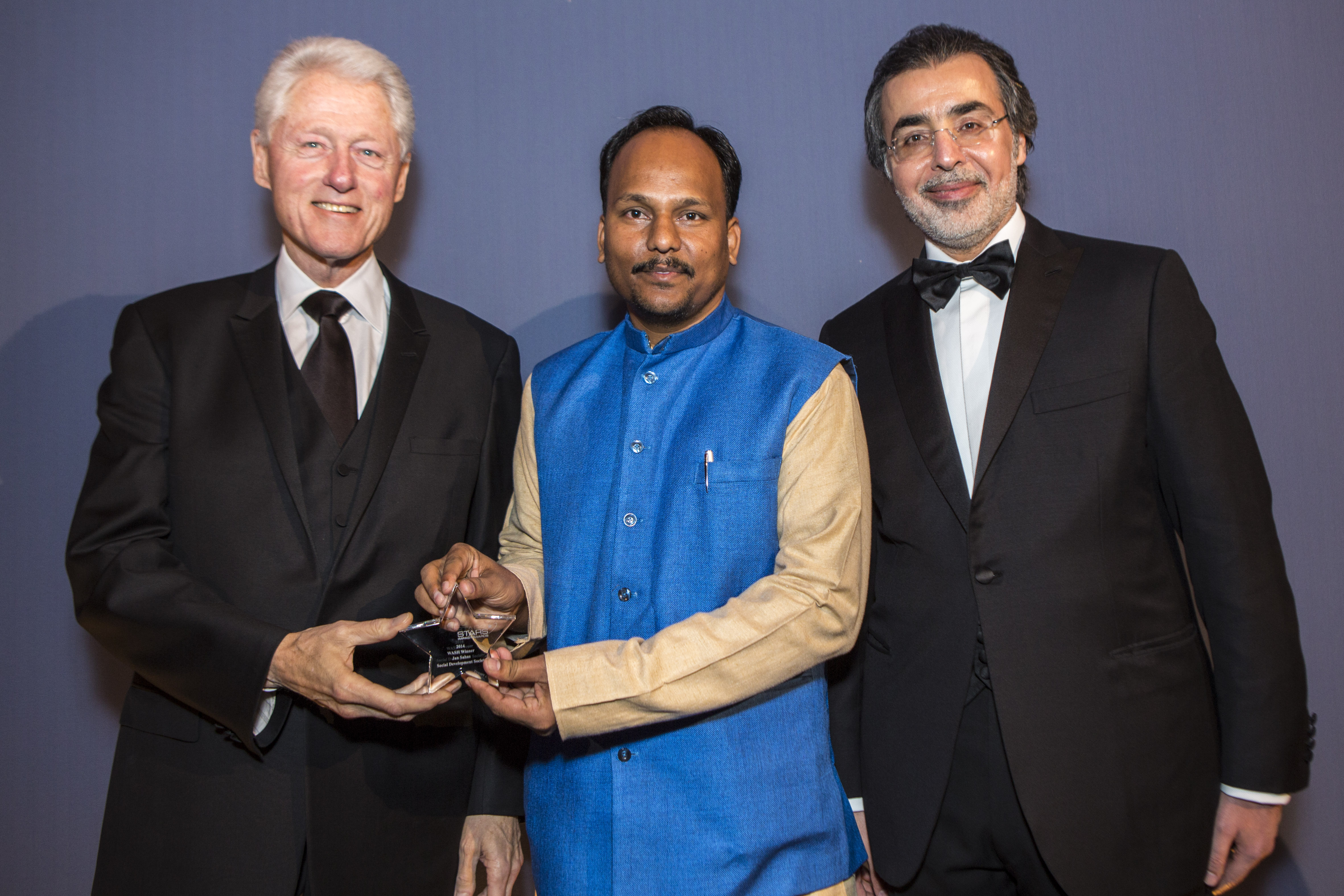
Ashif Shaikh receiving the Stars Impact Award 2014 from Bill Clinton (42nd president of United States of America) and Amr Al-Dabbagh.

Ashif soon realised that a regular and strategic approach would be required to empower marginalised, socially excluded communities. As a result, Ashif along with his activist friends formed Jan Sahas in the year 2000 with a staff strength of 12 volunteers to promote and protect social transformation. Over the years, Jan Sahas has emerged as one of the leading organisations transformative change for the most excluded social groups in India. Today, almost two decades later, it has grown to a formidable team of over 600 staff and 4800 volunteers based out of 8000 villages and towns. Jan Sahas works intensively in 55 districts in India across Rajasthan, Bihar, Maharashtra, Chhattisgarh, Madhya Pradesh, Delhi-NCR and Uttar Pradesh. Through its network of collaborating organisations Jan Sahas has a presence in the states of Orissa, Tamil Nadu, Telangana, Pondicherry and Jharkhand.

In 2012 Jan Sahas under Ashif’s leadership began intensive work on eliminating caste-based commercial exploitation of minor girls and has developed unique strategies to work within very closed patriarchal caste networks to enable girls to liberate themselves from this caste-based sexual slavery. Till March 2019, Jan Sahas has prevented 6800 young girls from entering the vicious system of caste-based commercial sexual exploitation.

In the year 2020, due to COVID-19 pandemic and lockdown, several migrant workers in India have lost their livelihoods or were stuck in places a thousand kilometers away from their house. As a response, in April 2020 Jan Sahas team initiated a rapid assessment survey of migrant workers in India to understand the situation. Based on the findings team initiated COVID Relief Response with the support of thousands of individuals across India and more than 30 philanthropic partners and developmental organisation. As a result in 100 days the team was able to reach out to 10,40,000 individuals from the migrant communities, 1,237 survivors of sexual violence, 12,480 frontline health workers and state actors in 19 states across India. Similarly, in 2021 the second wave of COVID-19 affected the nation, and the fresh lockdown was implemented to control the spread of the virus. These situations aggravated the conditions for vulnerable families. From May 2021 Jan Sahas team initiated relief activity for the second wave and in four months more than 5 lakh individuals from vulnerable sections of the society received emergency support of dry ration kits, safety kits and medical assistance.

In October 2020, just after the first wave of COVID-19 Jan Sahas initiated the Migrants Resilience Collaborative (MRC) to focus on the long-term economic recovery of migrant families. This is a grassroots-led multi-stakeholder collaborative of nonprofit, philanthropic, and private sector organisations focused on ensuring safety, security, and mobility for vulnerable migrant families across India. So far the collaborative has a strong presence in 88 districts of 12 states across India. The objective is to support 10 million workers and their families in 100 districts and cities in the next 5 years. The collaborative will be India's largest non-governmental initiative dedicated to migrant workers and their families.

=== Rashtriya Garima Abhiyaan ===
In the year 2000, Ashif had started working with women who carried, cleaned and disposed of human excreta manually under extremely cruel conditions in villages of Madhya Pradesh. It took about a year of discussions and organising them to overcome the deep sense of impurity and inferiority they had internalized.

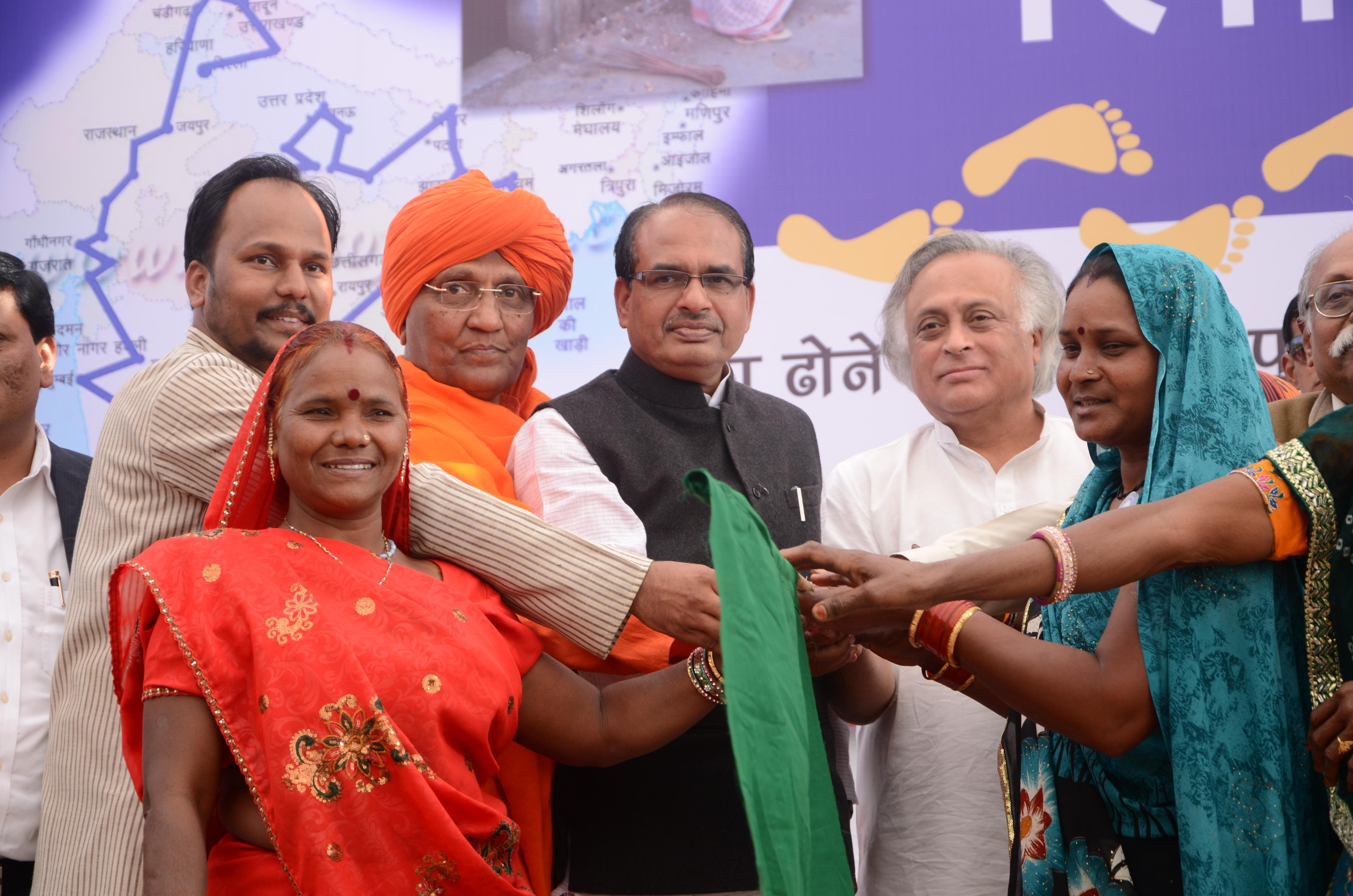
On 30 November 2012, Ashif Shaikh, Social Activist Swami Agnivesh, Shivraj Chauhan (Madhya Pradesh Chief Minister), Jairam Ramesh (Minister of Rural Development) and the community members flagged off the "Maila Mukti Yatra" from Bhopal

By the year 2006, Ashif and his team had gained enough experience on the issue of manual scavenging and thus Rashtriya Garima Abhiyan was formed, which was a membership-based organisation of women who had liberated themselves from manual scavenging. These women became role models for other Dalit women to break the silence and burn the excreta collection baskets they were traditionally supposed to carry on their heads or waists. Ashif and his team supported the women to overcome and fight the backlash that the women faced from upper caste communities. They came out in public to demand from the government a stringent policy for the elimination of the practice and for a dignified process of rehabilitation.

Rashtriya Garima Abhiyan used a positive transformation approach to empower manual scavengers, village after village, to take collective action, burn their cane baskets, demolish dry latrines and stand united in opposition to caste-based exploitation. On 30 November 2012, a Nationwide March for Total Eradication of Inhuman Slavery of Manual Scavenging "Maila Mukti Yatra" was organised from Bhopal (Madhya Pradesh). After marching for two months and 10,000 kilometres, across 18 states and 200 districts, involving 10,000 liberated women and 50,000 manual scavengers, the National People’s March for Eradication of Manual Scavenging reached Delhi on 21 January 2013. Releasing the "Delhi Declaration for Eradication of Manual Scavenging," they demanded that India enforce laws prohibiting the practice nationwide. Ashif was also part of a PIL (Public Interest Litigation) filed in the Supreme Court for abolition and rehabilitation of all manual scavengers across India. In 2013 the government of India finally announced a new law - The Prohibition of Employment as Manual Scavengers and their Rehabilitation, 2013.

=== Dignity March ===
Ashif and his team has been working to end sexual violence against women and children (SVWC) for many years using strategies that have evolved on the basis of the understanding of ground realities in various regions. At first, he along with support from Jan Sahas, offered survivors legal support in their struggle for justice. But soon they realised that the nature of challenges that survivors faced due to SVWC cannot be slotted into a singular event. These may not necessarily occur within a discrete time frame. He understood that they need to diversify support to survivors to help them to deal with the long-term trauma, stigma, ostracism, and loss of dignity, shelter, livelihoods and, perhaps, even education that may occur in the aftermath of SVWC.

As a result, Ashif organised, the first national forum of survivors of rape, sexual violence and trafficking in August 2017 at Bhopal (Madhya Pradesh) under the banner of Rashtriya Garima Abhiyan. The objective of this forum was to provide survivors and their family members a platform to voice their challenges and experiences. This marked the beginning of the creation of a sustainable national-level network of survivors.

Motivated by the commitment of the survivors and armed with the slogan of "Shame to Support" a mass movement was initiated. As a result, on 20 December 2018 in Mumbai, under the leadership of Ashif and support from several NGOs including Jan Sahas, ‘Dignity March to end sexual violence against women and children’ was organised. A 10,000 kilometer national march was led by 25,000 survivors of rape and their family members across 200 districts of 24 States/UTs in India. Through their powerful speeches, street theatre, songs and slogans, public rallies and press conferences, Ashif and the survivors stood side-by-side demanding that victim shaming ends and society moves forward to support the survivors and discourage the perpetrators. After two months the march culminated in Delhi on 22 February 2019. Dignity March mobilised 10 million citizens to speak up, condemn the act of sexual violence and shift the blame to perpetrators, collectively holding the state actors accountable for ensuring justice to survivors.

=== Lawyers Initiative Forum(LIF) ===
Ashif was a key member in the formation of the Lawyers Initiative Forum, which is a unique platform established by practicing lawyers who come from socially excluded communities including Dalit, Tribal, Minority and women lawyers in north and central Indian states. These lawyers are majorly practicing in lower courts. The forum evolved from the Centre for Social Justice and Empowerment, a program run by a network of six organisations working on strengthening the criminal justice system in India. The forum has 1,522 practicing lawyers as members across seven states and they are supporting survivors for accessing justice and towards strengthening the criminal justice system. Ashif is working towards strengthening national and international (United Nations) policies and laws through advocacy.

== Awards ==
1. Impact Leader Award at the 9th India CSR Awards 2021 as part of 11th CSR Leadership Summit
2. Received the award on behalf of Jan Sahas for Best Skilling Initiative for Sanitation 2020 by India Sanitation Coalition at ISC-FICCI Sanitation Awards.
3. Awarded Social Innovator of the year 2020 by World Economic Forum
4. Ashoka Fellowship, 2015
5. Jan Sahas selected for The Times of India Social Impact Award 2014 in livelihood category
6. Jio Dil Se Award 2014 (Socio-Economic Category)
7. Nominated for the Human Rights Tulip Award 2014, Netherlands
8. Jan Sahas received Star Impact Award 2014, United Kingdom by the president Bill Clinton (42nd president of United States of America)
9. Social Bravery Award 2013 by Sony TV
10. M.A. Thomas National Human Right Award 2012
