= Shahu II of Kolhapur =

Pretender to the Maharaja of Kolhapur

Maharaja of Kolhapur (titular)
- Tenure: 9 May 1962 – 1971 (pretender 1971–present)
- Predecessor: Shahaji II
- Successor: Position abolished
- Born: 7 January 1948 (age 78); Bombay, Bombay Province, Dominion of India
- Spouse: Yadnaseniraje
- Issue: Sambhaji Raje; Malojiraje Chhatrapati
- Father: Shahaji II (Grandfather)
- Mother: Shalini Raje

Member of Parliament, Lok Sabha
- Incumbent
- Assumed office 4 June 2024
- Preceded by: Sanjay Mandlik
- Constituency: Kolhapur

Personal details
- Party: Indian National Congress

Shahu II (born 7 January 1948) is considered to be the 12th descendant of Chhatrapati Shivaji Maharaj and the great-grandson of Shahu I of Kolhapur and the son and heir to Shahaji II of Kolhapur. He is the current Member of Parliament in Lok Sabha from Kolhapur constituency and is a member Indian National Congress. He studied at the Bishop Cotton School, Bangalore and later on graduated from the Indore Christian College in 1967 with History, Economics and English literature. He became the ceremonial Maharaja of Kolhapur in 1962.

== Family ==
On 9 March 1970, he married Yadnaseniraje, from the Pawar family of Mangsuli. Their elder son Sambhaji was born in 1971 and the younger son Maloji in 1976. Sambhaji has done his MBA and has married Sanyogeetaraje and have a son named Shahaji. Maloji has done his B.A and has married Madhurimaraje and have a daughter and son named Yashashwini and Yashraj respectively. Yashashwini has graduated from Regent's University, London and is currently studying at Columbia University, New York, US. Sambhaji was nominated to the Rajyasabha and Maloji had represented Kolhapur in the Vidhansabha of Maharashtra.

== See also ==
- Maratha Empire
- List of Maratha dynasties and states
- List of Indian princely states

== Sources ==
Titles in pretence
Preceded by Shahaji II	— TITULAR — Maharaja of Kolhapur; 1983–present Reason for succession failure: Royal titles & privy purse abolished by Government of India	Succeeded by Incumbent (Pretender) Heir is Sambhaji Raje
