= Anjali Pawar =

Indian advocate

Anjali Tara Babanrao Pawar
- Born: 5 February
- Occupations: Director of Sakhee, consultant for Against Child Trafficking

Adv Anjali Pawar the director of the child rights non-governmental organization Sakhee and a consultant at Against Child Trafficking in Pune, Maharashra, which works in the field of child protection issues. During the course of her career, Pawar has advocated for child rights issues and worked to reunite adopted children with their biological families.

== Career ==
In 2010, Pawar helped Arun Dohle reunite with his biological mother. Dohle was adopted as an infant by German parents, but returned to India as an adult and contested the adoption in court, including the allegation that he was adopted without his mother's consent.

In 2012, Pawar advocated for a "detailed investigation into procurement of children through extortion, blackmail, threats and bribery of government officials," after Sakhee filed a petition with the Supreme Court seeking a stay on all inter-country adoptions until legal protections were implemented and to investigate the conditions at orphanages. Pawar stated that Maharashtra accounted for more than half of the inter-country adoptions in India and cited cases filed against adoption agencies alleging they demanded financial compensation for adoptions.

In 2015, Pawar filed a petition with the Maharashtra Protection of Child Rights Commission (MPCRC) to reunite children with their parents after they were allegedly taken by a UK national.

In 2016, as the director of Sakhee and a consultant for Against Child Trafficking, Pawar was quoted by The Times of India for her concerns related to the impact on children from inter-country adoptions, particularly for children with disabilities. By 2016, Against Child Trafficking estimated their work had reunited about 40 adoptees with their biological family.

In 2017, as a representative of Against Child Trafficking, Pawar helped Jessica (also known by her Indian name, Kamalini) Lindher with Mumbai police and local officials during Lindher's search for her biological parents. Lindher had been abandoned as a young child and adopted by Swedish parents in 1982, and returned to India several times with the hope of finding her biological parents.

In 2017, Pawar led a team from Sakhee to rescue a 12-year-old girl from suspected abuse and forced employment.

In 2018, Pawar spoke out against a proposal to remove court oversight from the adoption of children.

Pawar helped Jennifer Haynes, who was deported 2008 from the US to India, to find her parents
