= Anant Sadashiv Patwardhan =

Indian politician

- Constituency: Dewas Vidhan Sabha

Anant Sadashiv Patwardhan was an Indian politician from the state of the Madhya Pradesh. He represented Dewas Vidhan Sabha constituency in Madhya Pradesh Legislative Assembly by winning General election of 1957.
