= Gayatri Raje Pawar =

Indian politician

Member of the Madhya Pradesh Legislative Assembly
- Incumbent
- Assumed office 2015
- Preceded by: Tukoji Rao Pawar
- Constituency: Dewas

Personal details
- Party: Bhartiya Janta Party
- Occupation: Politician

Gayatri Raje Pawar is an Indian politician and member of the Bharatiya Janata Party. Pawar is a member of the Madhya Pradesh Legislative Assembly from the Dewas constituency in Dewas district. She was married to the late Maharaja of Dewas Senior Tukoji Rao Pawar (1963–2015).
