= Pawar =

Indian clan

Pawar (also spelled as Pavar and Puar) is an Indian surname found among the Maratha, Mahar or Koli people in Maharashtra.

Notable people bearing the Pawar name or its variants include:

- Ajit Pawar (born 1959), Indian politician; deputy chief minister of Maharashtra and nephew of Sharad Pawar
- Ameya Pawar (born 1980), American politician and City of Chicago Alderman
- Anand Pawar, Indian badminton player
- Anjali Pawar, Indian social worker
- Bharati Pawar, Indian politician
- Dagdu Maruti Pawar, Indian Dalit author
- Hemendra Singh Rao Pawar, titular Maharaja of Dhar State)
- Krishnaji Rao III Puar, Maharaja of Dewas Senior and Indian politician
- Kuldeep Pawar, Indian actor in the Marathi language film industry
- Lalita Pawar (1916-1998), popular Hindi TV & Marathi actress
- Narayan Rao Pawar (1925-2010), Indian independence activist and member of Arya Samaj who plotted to kill the last Nizam of Hyderabad
- Rajendra Singh Pawar, Indian businessman, chairman of NIIT
- Rajesh Pawar (born 1979), Indian cricketer
- Sharad Pawar (born 1940), Indian politician
- Suraj Pawar, Indian actor
- Tukoji Rao IV Puar, Maharaja of Dewas Senior and Indian politician from Madhya Pradesh, belonging to the Bharatiya Janata Party
- Tukoji Rao III Puar, Maharaja of Dewas Senior
- Urmila Pawar (born 1945), Indian Marathi-language writer
- Uttamsingh Pawar, Indian politician
- Vikram Singh Rao II Puar, titular Maharaja of Dewas Senior

== See also ==
- Parmar (clan)
- Parmar
