= Ponwar cattle =

Breed of cattle

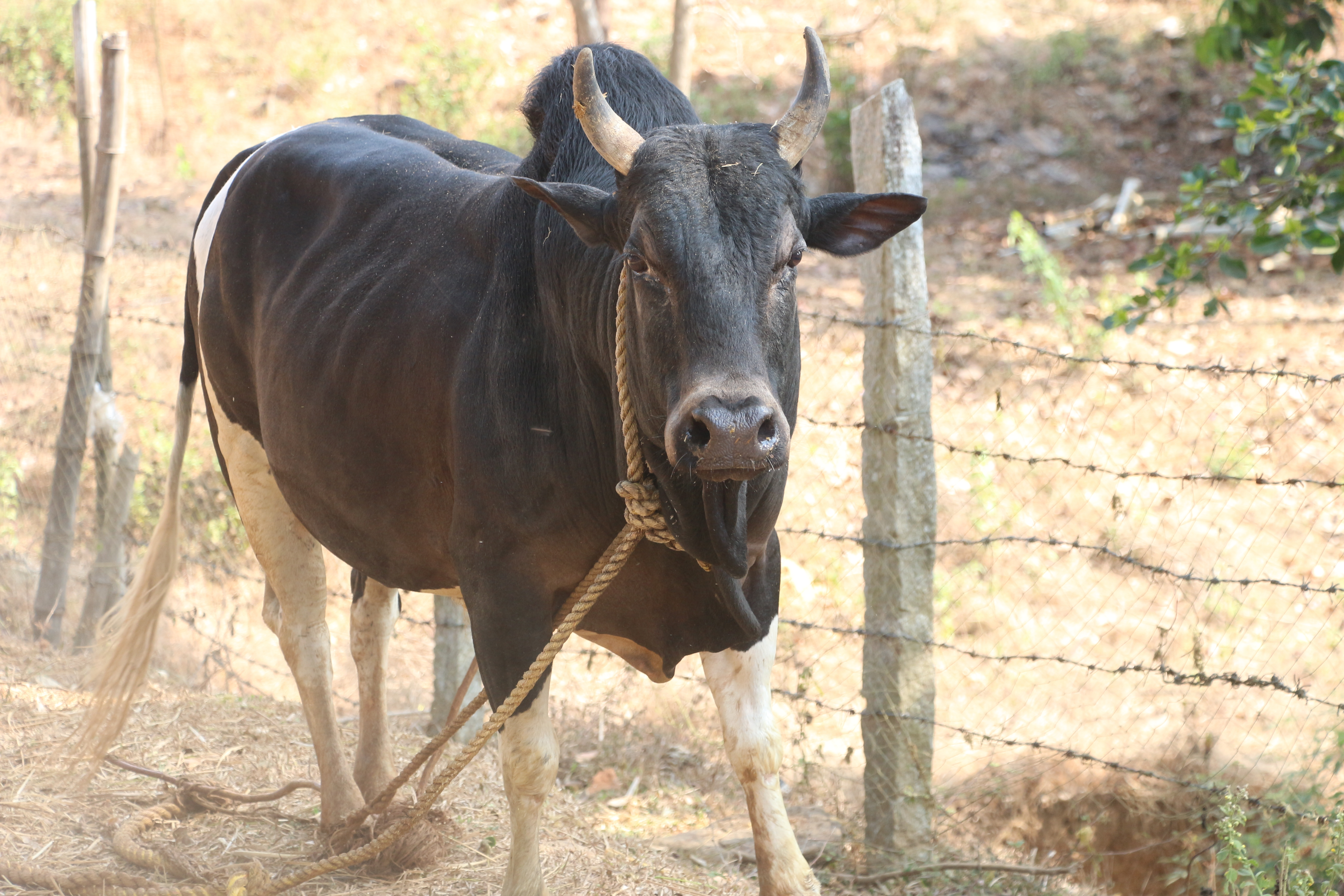
Ponwar Bull

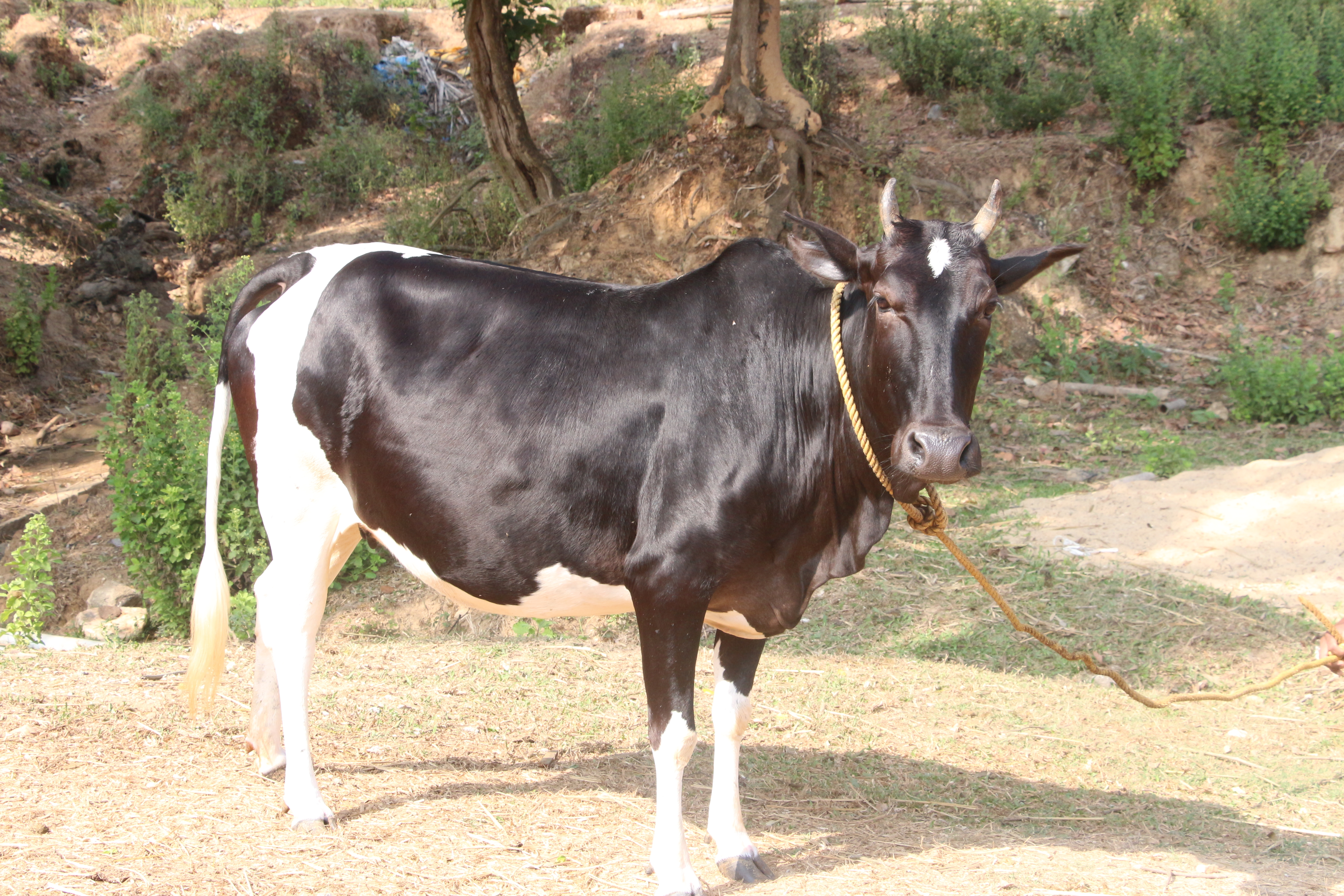
Ponwar Cow

Ponwar is an indigenous cattle breed of India. It is known to be originated at Ponwar in Puranpur Taluk in Pilibhit district of Uttar Pradesh state and the breed is named after the same place. The cattle is also restricted to the small geographic area adjoining Ponwar. The cattle are known to be very active and are of fiery disposition. They exhibit dual coloured complexion of black and white. It is a draught breed and is mainly used for cart pulling. The breeding tract lies between latitude 28°4’ and 28°8’ North and between longitude 79°0’ and 80°4’ East.The tail switch is white in black animals and black in those having a greater proportion of white patches. The body is small, compact and non-fleshy, the face is small and narrow and the ears are small. The horns are small to medium and curve inward with pointed tips. The hump is small in females and developed in males. The tail is long and reaches to below the hock. Cows have small udders and teats. The animals of this breed possess an aggressive temperament.

== See also ==
- List of breeds of cattle
