= Dewas Senior =

Maratha princely state during the British Raj

Coordinates: 22.96°N 76.06°E

Dewas State (Senior Branch)
- Princely State of British India
- 1728–1948
- Flag
- Area
  - 1901: 1,160 km^{2} (450 sq mi)
- Population
  - 1901: 62,312
- History
  - Established: 1728
  - Independence of India: 1948
Preceded by	Succeeded by
British Raj	India
- Today part of: India

Dewas Senior was established by Tukoji Rao I Pawar during the Maratha conquest of Central India. It was a 15 Gun Salute Maratha princely state. On 12 December 1818 it became a British protectorate.

== History ==
The original state was founded in 1728 by Tukoji Rao, from the Pawar clan of the Marathas who together with his younger brother Jivaji Rao, had advanced into Malwa with Peshwa Baji Rao I as part of the Maratha Conquest of Malwa. The brothers divided the territory among themselves; their descendants ruled as the senior and junior branches of the family. After 1841, each branch ruled his own portion as a separate state, though the lands belonging to each were intimately entangled; in Dewas, the capital town, the two sides of the main street were under different administrations and had different arrangements for water supply and lighting.

The two Rajas heading Dewas states both lived in separate residences in the town of Dewas, and ruled over separate areas.

The Senior branch had an area of 446 sq mi (1,160 km^{2}) and a population of in 62,312 in 1901. From 1907, both Dewas states were in the Malwa Agency of the Central India Agency. After India's independence in 1947, the Maharajas of Dewas acceded to India, and their states were integrated into Madhya Bharat, which became a state of India in 1950. In 1956, Madhya Bharat was merged into Madhya Pradesh state.

Dewas Junior Darbar (Court) was composed of Jagirdars, Sardars, Istamuradars and Mankaris.

== Rulers ==
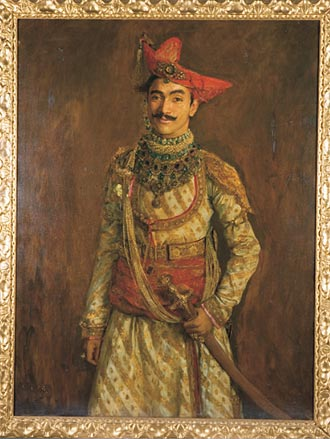
HH Maharaja Tukoji Rao III Puar of Dewas Sr

=== Rajas ===
- 1728 – 16 Nov 1754 Tukoji Rao I Pawar (b. c.1696 – d. 1754)
- 16 Nov 1754 – 24 Mar 1789 Krishnaji Rao I Pawar (b. 1740 – d. 1789)
- 16 Nov 1754 – 1756 Rani Savitribai (f) -Regent
- 24 Mar 1789 – 28 Sep 1827 Tukoji Rao II Pawar (b. 1783 – d. 1827)
- 24 Mar 1789 – 4 Oct 1794 Rani Gangabai (f) -Regent
- 28 Sep 1827 – 26 Jul 1860 Rukmangad Tukoji Rao Pawar (b. 1821 – d. 1860) "Khasi Sahib"
- 28 Sep 1827 – 1835 Bhawanibai Raje Sahib (f) -Regent (d. 1835)
- 26 Jul 1860 – 12 Oct 1899 Krishnaji Rao II Pawar (b. 1849 – d. 1899) "Baba Sahib"
- 26 Oct 1860 – 23 Mar 1867 Maharani Yamunabai (f) -Regent (b. 1829 – d. 1909)
- 12 Oct 1899 – 1 Jan 1918 Tukoji Rao III Pawar "Kesho Rao" (b. 1888 – d. 1937) "Bapu Sahib" (from 12 Dec *1911, Sir Tukaji Rao III Pawar)

=== Maharajas ===
- 1 Jan 1918 – 21 Dec 1937 Sir Tukoji Rao III Pawar "Kesho Rao (s.a.) Bapu Sahib" (fled to Pondicherry, French India 26 Jul 1934)
- 21 Dec 1937 – 23 Mar 1947 Vikramsinh Rao I Pawar "Nana Sahib" (b. 1910 – d. 1983) (from 12 Jun 1941, Sir Vikramsinh Rao Pawar) (administrator from 26 Jul 1934)
- 11 Aug 1941 – 15 May 1943 Maharani Pramilabai (f) -Regent (b. 1910 – d. 2008) (1st time)
- 23 Mar 1947 – 15 Aug 1947 Maharani Pramilabai (f) -Regent (s.a.) (2nd time)
- 23 Mar 1947 – 15 August 1947 Krishnaji Rao III Pawar "Aba Sahib" (b.1932 – d. 1999)

=== Titular Maharajas ===
- 15 August 1947 – 21 Jan 1994 Krishnaji Rao III Pawar "Aba Sahib"
- 21 Jan 1994 – 19 June 2015 Tukoji Rao IV Pawar (b.1963 – d. 2015)
- 19 June 2015 – Present Vikram Singh Rao II Pawar (b.1989 – present)

== See also ==
- Dewas Junior State
- Dhar State
- The Hill of Devi
- List of Maratha dynasties and states
- List of Indian princely states
