= Dhar State =

Princely state in present-day India

Coordinates: 22.6°N 75.3°E

- Princely State of India
- 1730–1947
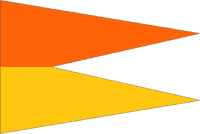
- Flag

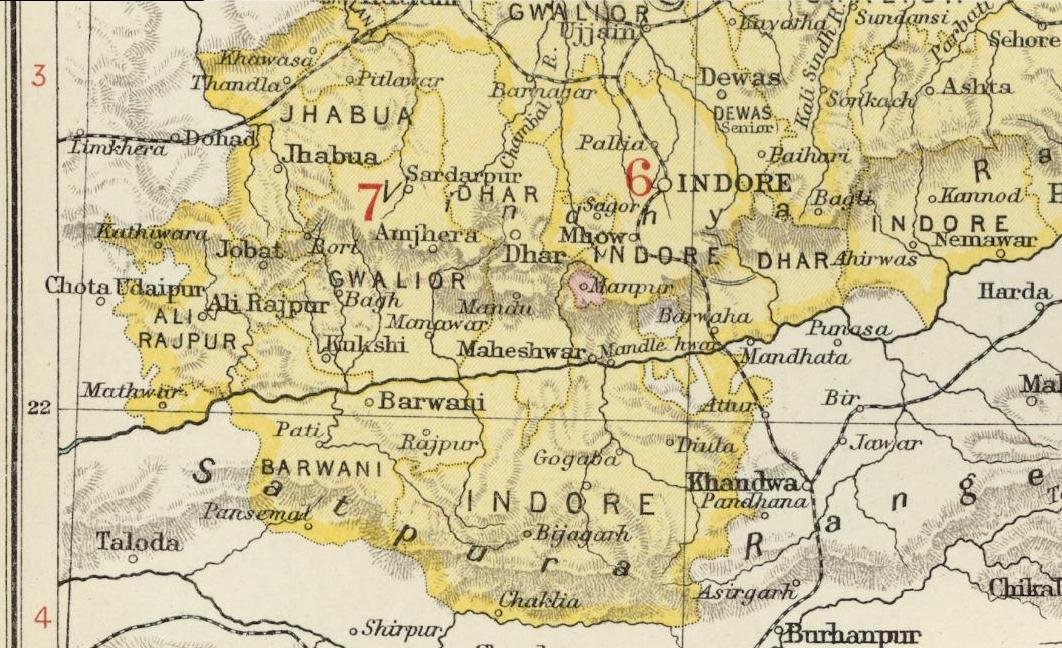
- Dhar State in the Imperial Gazetteer of India
- Area
  - 1941: 4,660 km^{2} (1,800 sq mi)
- Population
  - 1941: 253,210
- History
  - Established: 1730
  - Independence of India: 1947
Succeeded by
India
- Today part of: India
- Columbia-Lippincott Gazetteer (New York: Columbia University Press, 1952) p. 510

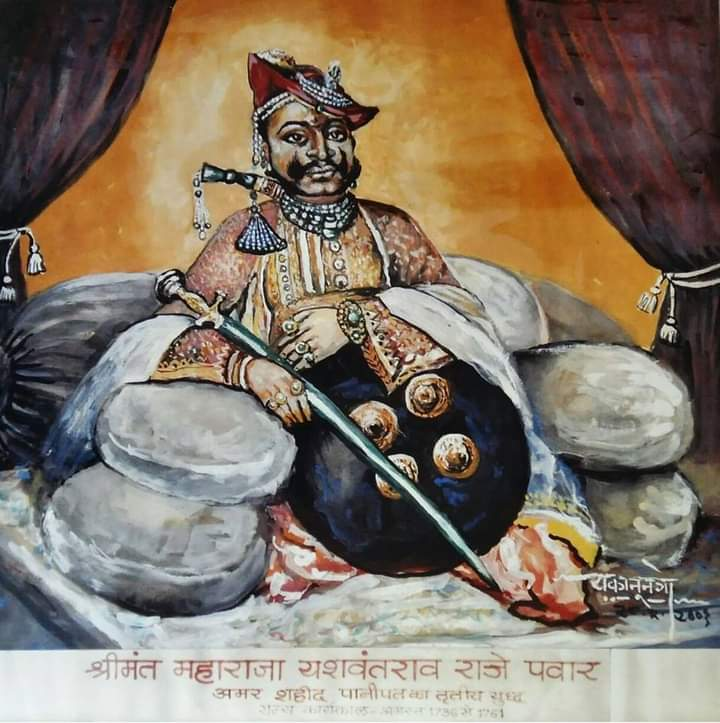
Yeshwant Rao Pawar, 3rd Raja of Dhar

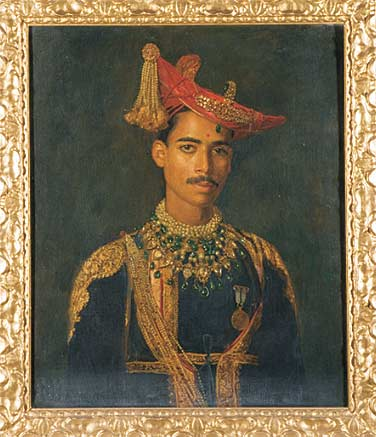
HH Maharaja Udaji Rao II Pawar of Dhar

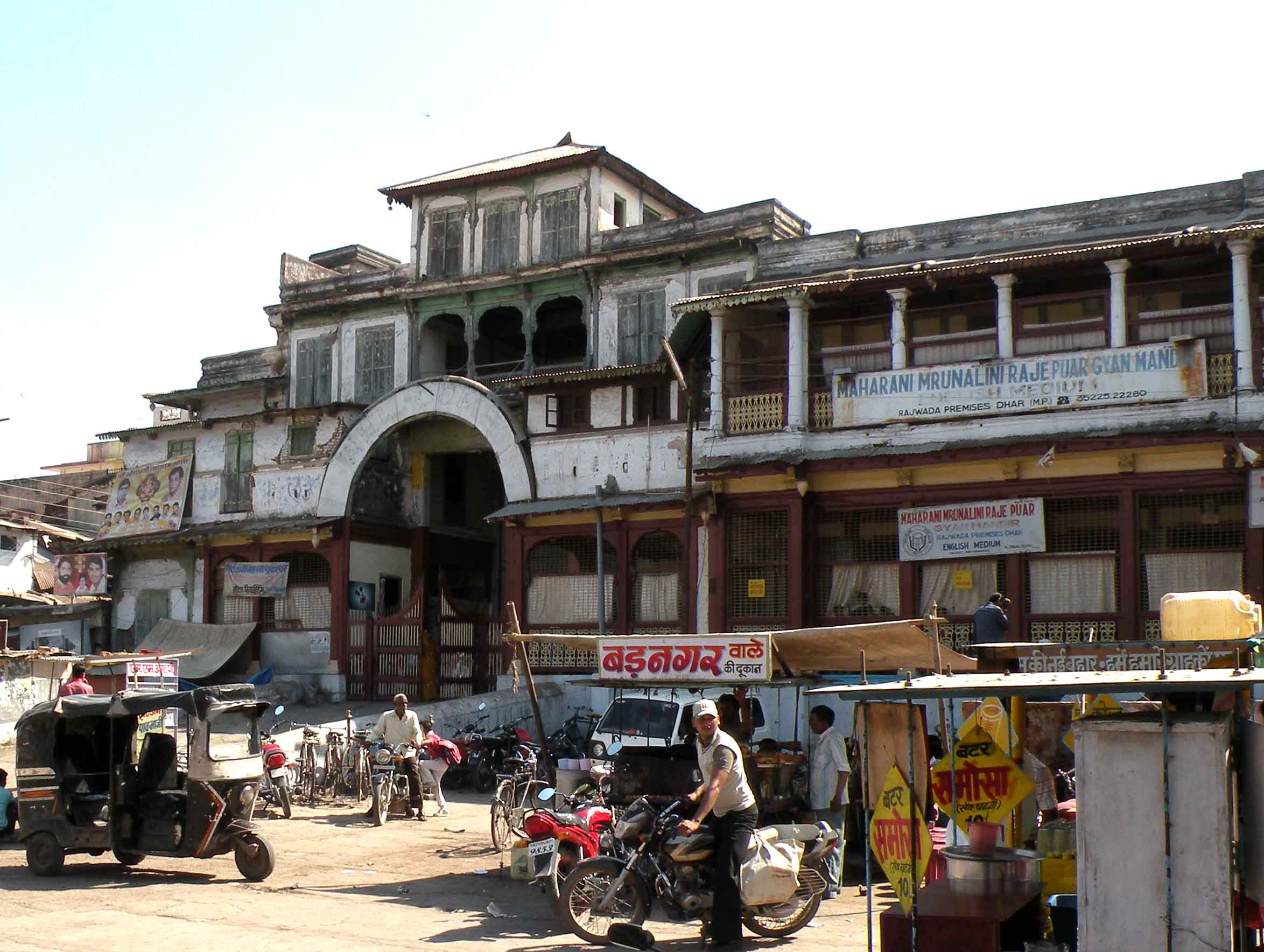
Gate of City Palace, built in 1875

Dhar State was a Maratha princely state. It was a salute state in the colonial sway of the Central India Agency. Dhar began as one of the states during Maratha dominance in India about 1730. In 1941 it had an area of 1,798 square miles (4,660 km^{2}) and a population of 253,210. Dhar was the capital of the state from 1732 (from the 1728 foundation, the Raja's first seat had been at Malthan in Maharashtra). In 1948, it became part of Madhya Bharat.

Lying between 21°57' and 23°15' north, and 74°37' and 75°37' east, Dhar State was bordered on the north by Ratlam State and Sailana State; east by parts of Gwalior and Indore States; on the south by Barwani State, and on the west by Jhabua State and portions of Gwalior State and Indore State.

Prathmeshwar Singh Rao Pawar is the current titular crown prince of Dhar, as Hemendra Sinh Rao Pawar (the titular Maharaja of Dhar) died in November 2023.

== History ==
The present Dhar dynasty was founded in 1729 by Udaji Rao Pawar, a distinguished Maratha general who received the territory as a grant from the Chhatrapati.

Yashwant Rao Pawar also had prominent role in the northern expansion of the Maratha Empire. In the Third battle of Panipat (1761), Atai Khan, the adopted son of the Wazir Shah Wali Khan, was said to have been killed by Yeshwant Rao Pawar when he climbed atop his elephant and struck him down.

During the Pindhari raids, the state's territory was whittled away, until it was restored in size on 10 January 1819, when it signed a Subsidiary alliance agreement with the British East India Company and became a major Princely state, enjoying indirect rule under British protectorate.

The Dhar State Darbar (Court) was composed of Sardars, Jagirdars, Istamuradars, Mankaris, Thakurs and Bhumias.

The state was confiscated by the British after the Revolt of 1857. In 1860, it was restored to Raja Anand Rao III Pawar, then a minor, with the exception of the detached district of Bairusia which was granted to the Begum of Bhopal. Anand Rao, who received the personal title Maharaja and the KCSI in 1877, died in 1898; he was succeeded by Udaji Rao II Pawar.

== Rulers ==
Reign start	Reign end	Name	Birth-death
1728	1732	Udaji Rao I Pawar	
1732	1736	Anand Rao I Pawar	(b. ... – died 1749)
1736	1761, 6 January	Yeshwant Rao I Pawar	(1724–1761)
1761, 6 January	1782	Khande Rao Pawar	(b. c.1758 – died 1782)
1782	1807, 10 June	Anand Rao II Pawar	(1782–1807)
1807, Dec	1810	Ramchandra Rao I Pawar	(1807–1810)
1807, Dec	1810	Maina Bai (f) (regent)	
1810	1833, October	Ramchandra Rao II Pawar	(1805–1833)
1834, 21 April	1857, 23 May	Yeshwant Rao II Pawar	(1823–1857)
1857, 23 May	1858, 19 Jan	Anand Rao III Pawar (1st time)	(1844–1898)
1858, 19 Jan	1860, 1 May	state abolished	
1860, 1 May	1898, 29 July	Anand Rao III Pawar (2nd time)	(1844–1898)
1898, 29 July	1926	Udaji Rao II Pawar "Baba Sahib"	(1886–1926)
1926	1931	Laxmibai Sahiba (f) (regent)	
1926	1989	Anand Rao IV Pawar	(1920–1989)

=== Titular Maharajas ===
- 2015–2023 : Hemendra Singh Rao Pawar
- 2023-Present : Prathmeshwar Singh Rao Pawar

== Postal/Philatelic information ==
In 1897 primitive stamps with entirely native text. The second definitive issue bore the name DHAR STATE in Latin script; a total of 8 stamps. Since 1901 Indian stamps have been in use.

== See also ==
- Maratha Empire
- List of Maratha dynasties and states
- List of princely states of British India (alphabetical)
- Dewas Junior
- Dewas Senior
