= Dewas Junior =

Maratha princely state during the British Raj

Coordinates: 22.96°N 76.06°E

Dewas State (Junior Branch) देवास (छोटी पाती राज्य / धाकटी पाती संस्थान)
- State Within the Maratha Confederacy (1728 - 1818); Princely State of British India
- 1728–1948
- Flag

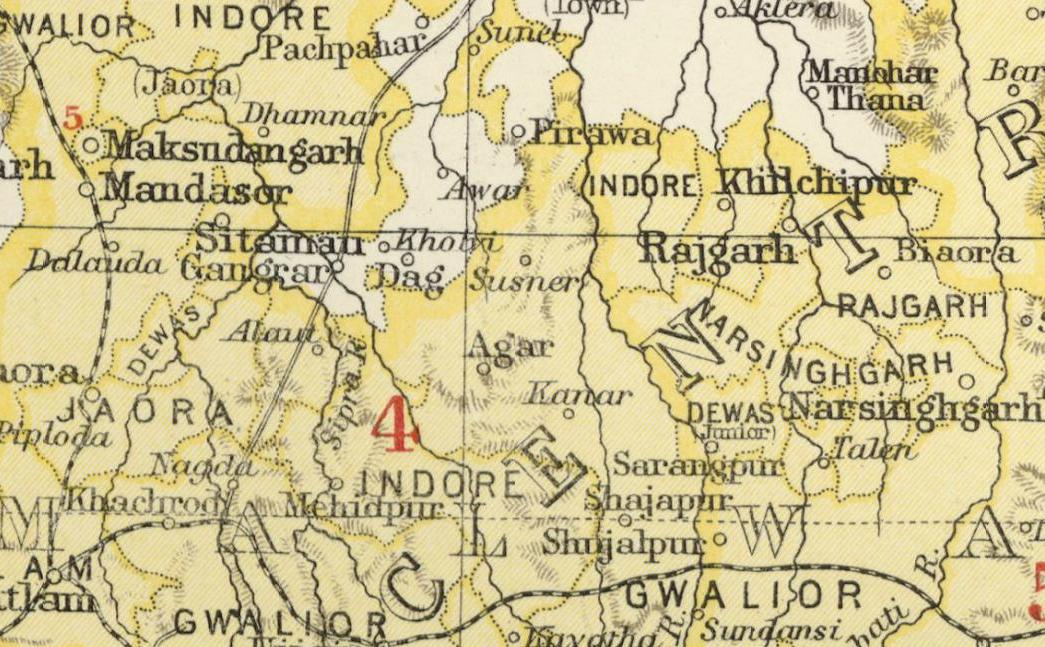
- Dewas Sr and Dewas Jr. states in the Imperial Gazetteer of India
- Area
  - 1901: 1,100 km^{2} (420 sq mi)
- Population
  - 1901: 54,904
- History
  - Established: 1728
  - Independence of India: 1948
Preceded by	Succeeded by
Maratha Empire	India
- Today part of: India

Dewas Junior was established by Jivaji Rao I Puar in 1728 during the Maratha conquest of Central India. It was a 15-gun salute Maratha princely state. On 12 December 1818, it became a British protectorate.

== History ==
The original state was founded in 1728 by Jivaji Rao, from the Puar clan of Marathas who together with his older brother (Tukoji) had advanced into Malwa with Peshwa Baji Rao, as part of the Maratha conquest.

The brothers divided the territory among themselves; their descendants ruled as the junior and senior branches of the family. After 1841, each branch ruled his own portion as a separate state, though the lands belonging to each were intimately entangled; in Dewas, the capital town, the two sides of the main street were under different administrations and had different arrangements for water supply and lighting.

The Junior branch had an area of 440 sq mi (1,100 km^{2}) and had a population of 54,904 in 1901. Both Dewas states were in the Malwa Agency of the Central India Agency. After India's independence in 1947, the Maharajas of Dewas acceded to India, and their states were integrated into Madhya Bharat, which became a state of India in 1950. In 1956, Madhya Bharat was merged into Madhya Pradesh state.

Dewas Junior Darbar (Court) was composed of Sardars, Mankaris, Istamuradars, Thakurs and Jagirdars.

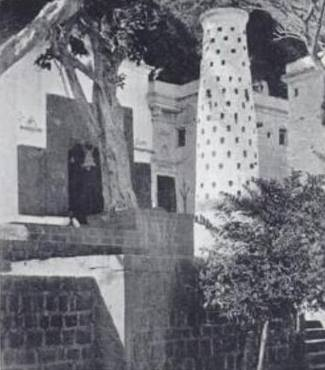
An old photograph of Goddess Chamunda Mata's Temple on Dewas Tekri (Hill).

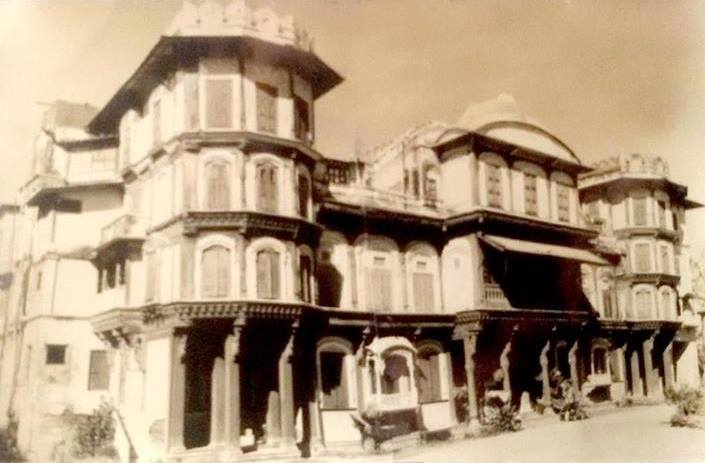
The Old Palace (Rajwada) of Dewas Junior.

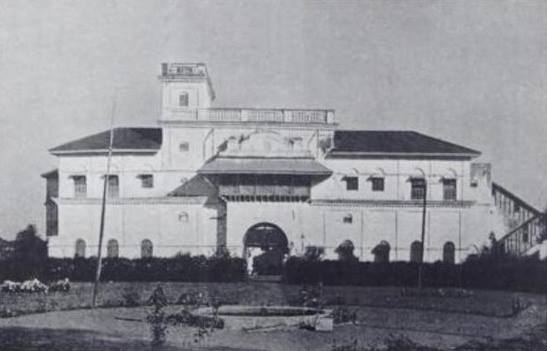
The Durga Bagh Palace, Dewas Junior State.

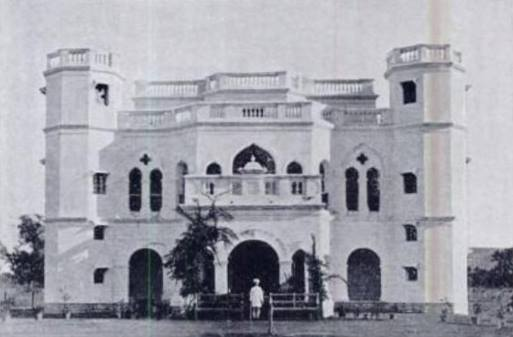
Shree Lakshmi Narayan Bhawan Club, Dewas Junior State.

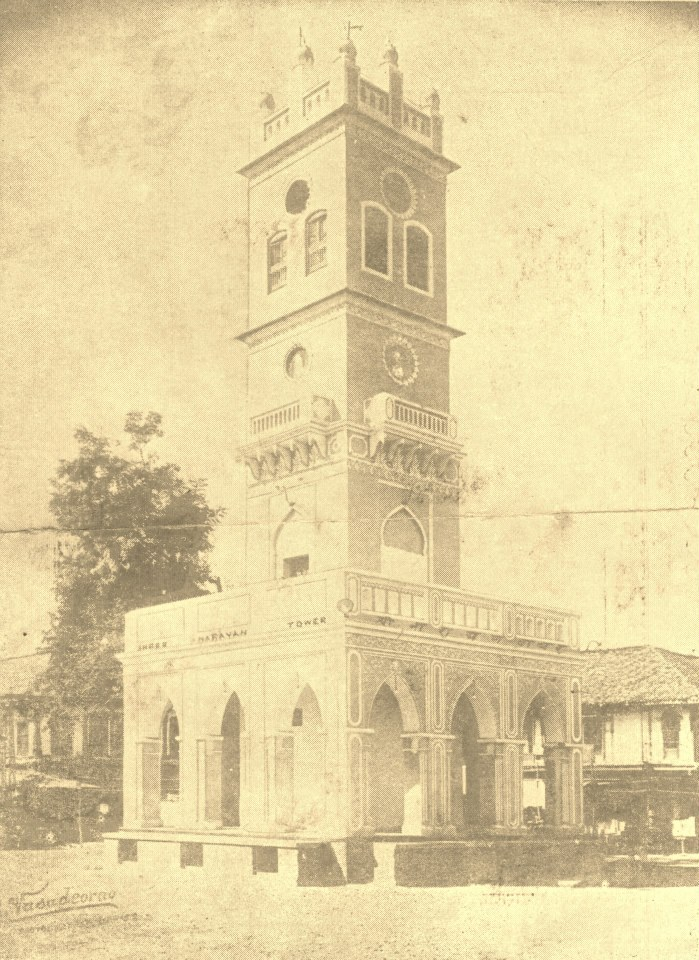
Shree Narayan Tower, Dewas Junior State. The Clock Tower is named after HH Raja Srimant Narayanrao (Dada Sahib) Puar of Dewas Junior State.

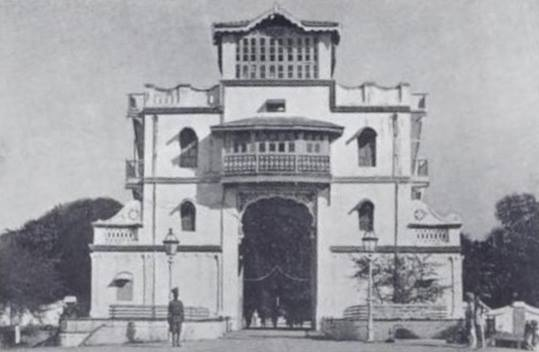
The Gate at Shree Malhar, The Residence of His Holiness Shri Shilnath Maharaj.

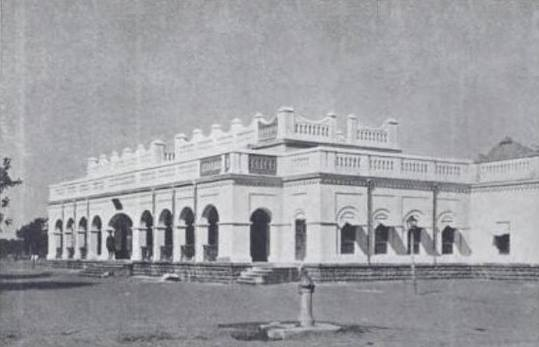
The Law Courts, Dewas Junior State.

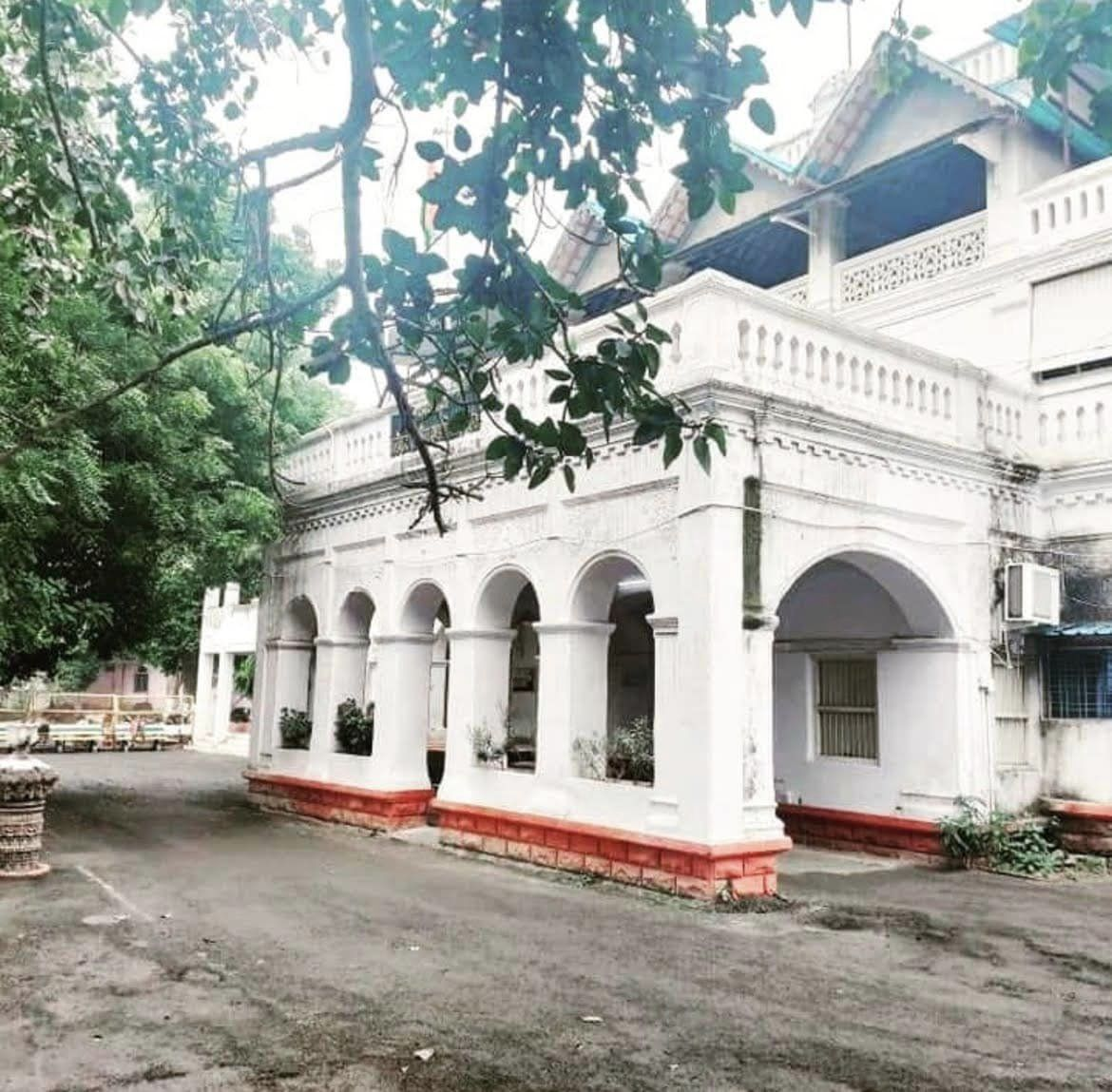
Dewas Collectorate Building (originally known as Lakshmi Niwas Palace of Dewas Junior). This was illegally demolished by the local administration in March 2023, despite an ongoing case and strong opposition by the citizens of Dewas.

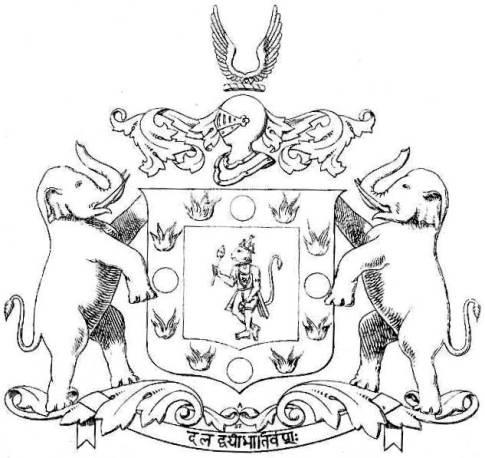
Dewas Junior Coat of Arms

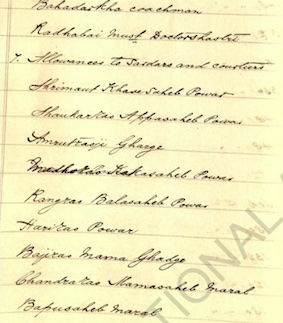
1890 List of Dewas Junior Sardars & Mankaris Page 01

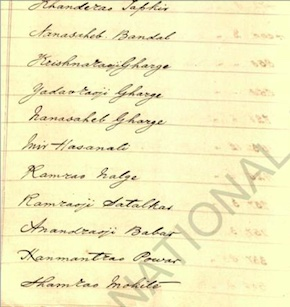
1890 List of Dewas Junior Sardars & Mankaris Page 02

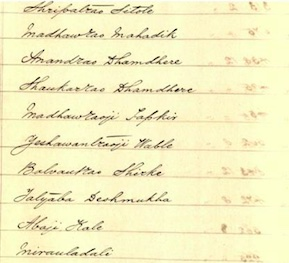
1890 List of Dewas Junior Sardars & Mankaris Page 03

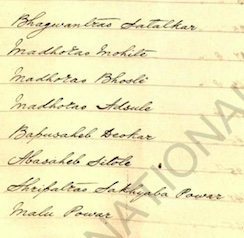
1890 List of Dewas Junior Sardars & Mankaris Page 04

== List of Rulers ==
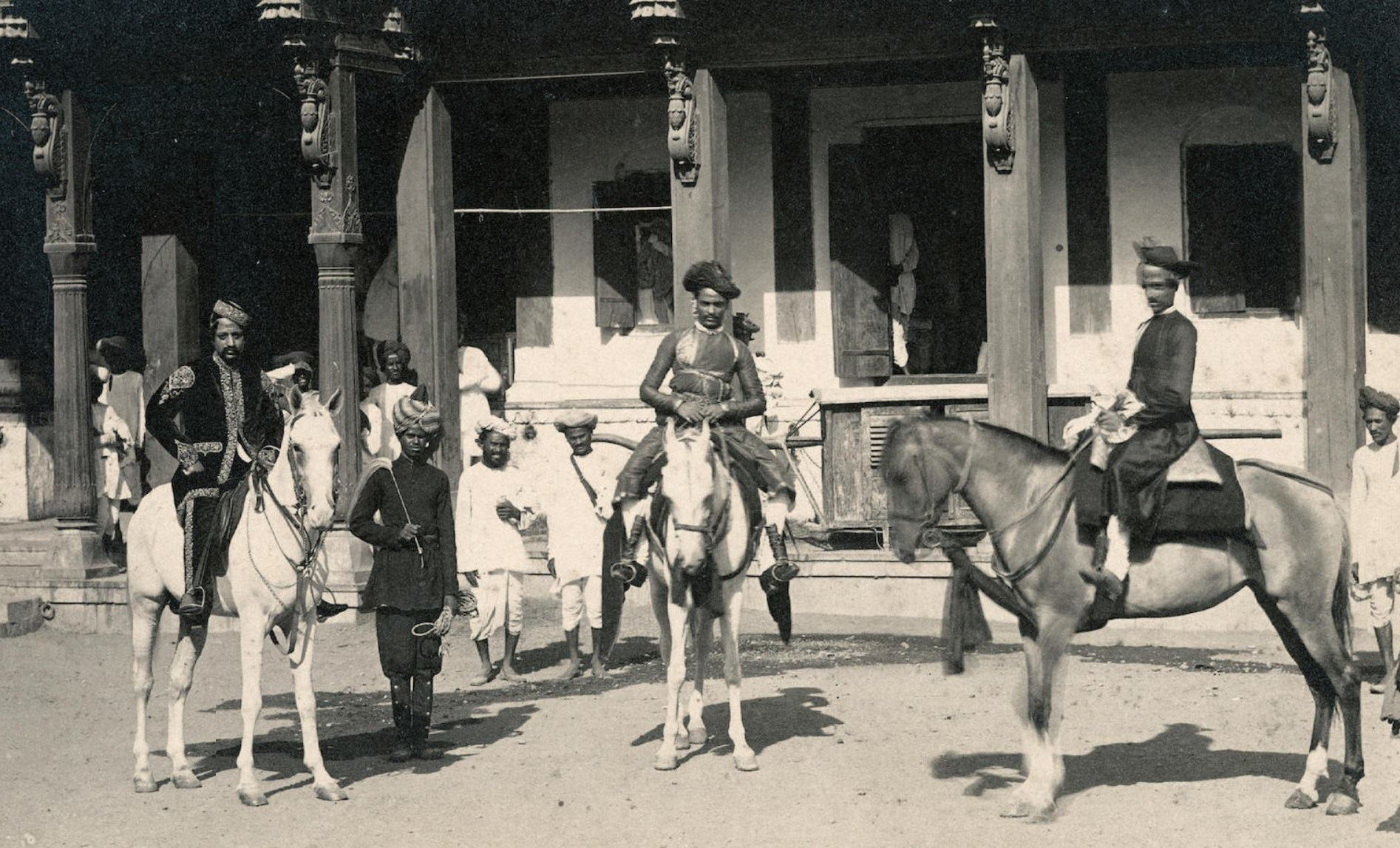
HH Raja Narayan Rao Puar (first from left) in front of the Rajwada of Dewas Junior.

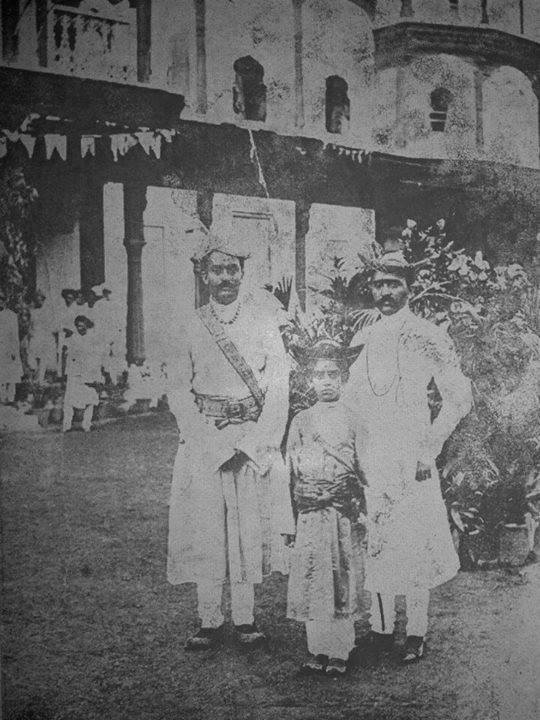
A rare photograph of the 3 successive Maharajas of Dewas Junior State. (L to R - HH Maharaja Sadashiv Rao Puar, HH Maharaja Yeshwant Rao Puar and HH Maharaja Malhar Rao Puar)

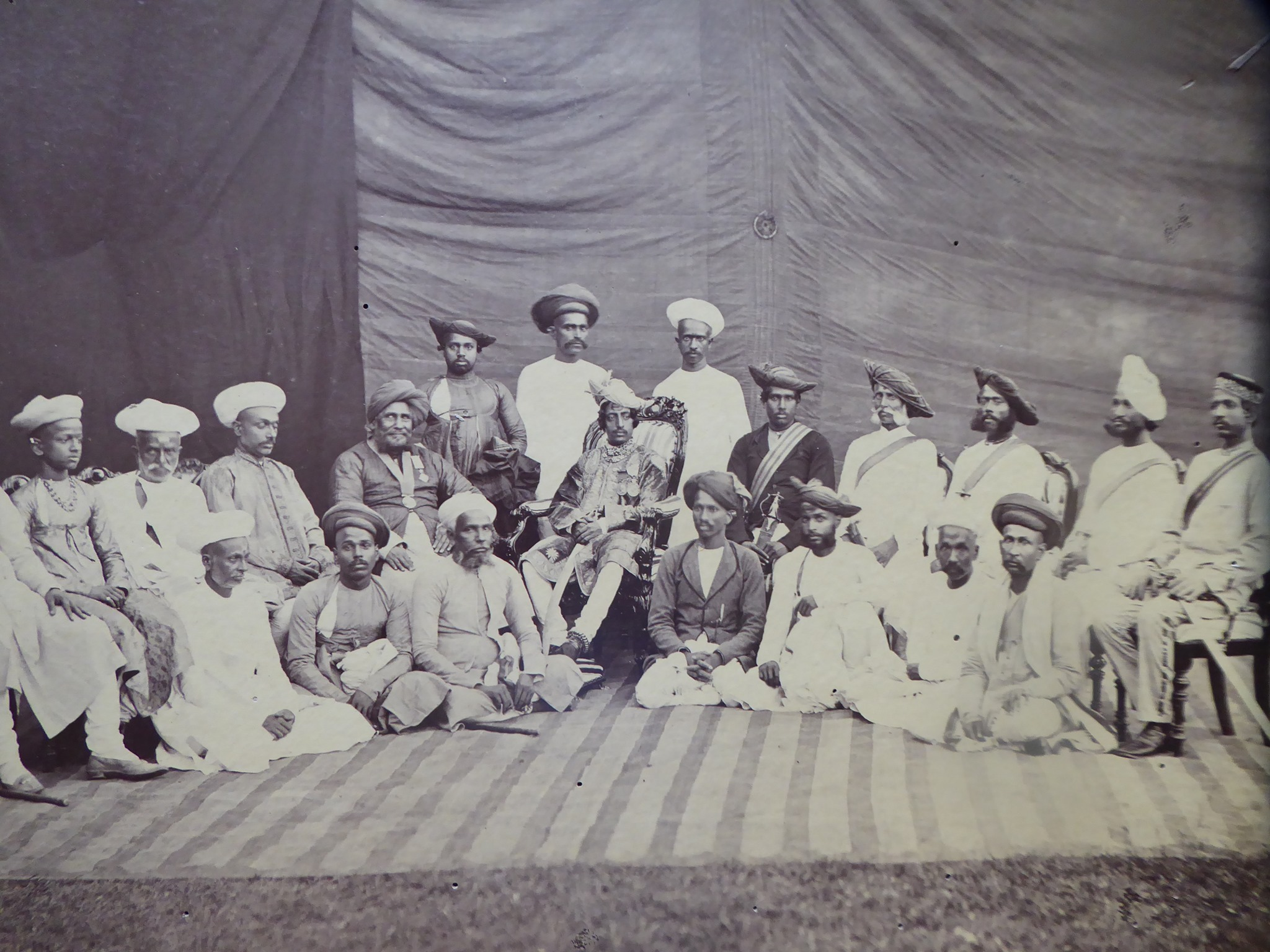
HH Raja Narayan Rao Puar with Dewas Junior Nobility

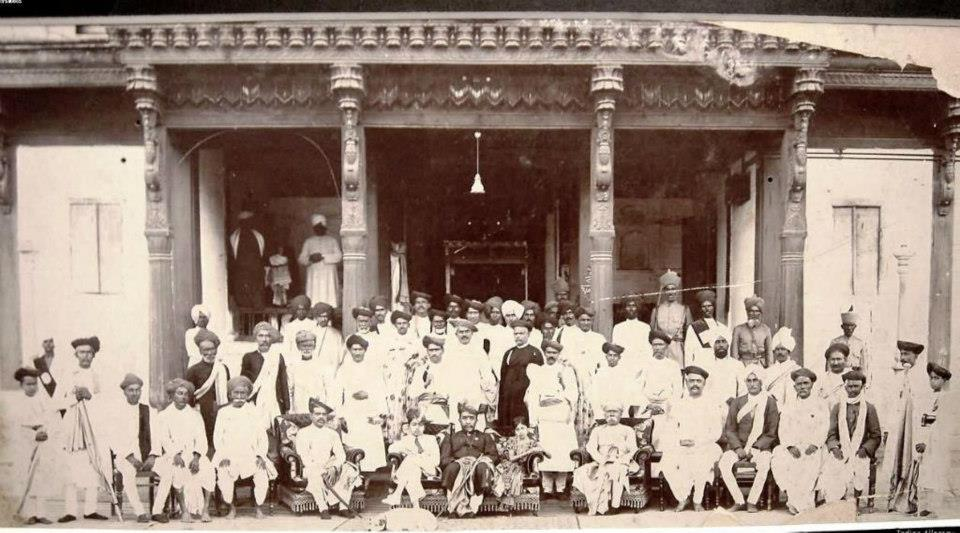
HH Maharaja Malhar Rao Puar, Royal family, Sardars, Mankaris, Jagirdars and Thakurs in front of the Dewas Junior Rajwada.

Title	Part of	Start of reign	End of reign	Name
Raja	Maratha Empire	1728	15 Aug 1774	Jivaji Rao Puar "Dada Sahib" (d. 1774)
Raja	Maratha Empire	15 Aug 1774	2 Dec 1790	Sadashiv Rao I Puar (d. 1790)
Raja	Maratha Empire	2 Dec 1790	1817	Rukmangad Rao Puar (b. 17.. – d. 1817)
Raja	Maratha Empire	1817	1818	Anand Rao Puar "Rao Sahib" (d. 1840)
Raja	British protectorate	1818	1840	Anand Rao Puar "Rao Sahib" (d. 1840)
Raja	British protectorate	1840	12 May 1864	Haibat Rao Puar (d. 1864)
Raja	British protectorate	12 May 1864	19 Jan 1892	Narayan Rao Puar "Dada Sahib" (b. 1860 – d. 1892)
Raja	British protectorate	12 May 1864	1877	Yamuna Bai Sahib -Regent + Rao Bahadur R.J. Bhide (Superintendent)
Raja	British protectorate	9 Jan 1892	1 Jan 1918	Malhar Rao Puar "Bhava Sahib" (b. 1877 – d. 1934) (from 1 Jan 1917, Sir Malhar Rao Puar)
Raja	British protectorate	19 Jan 1892	10 Aug 1913	Lala Bisheshar Nath – Regent
Maharaja	British protectorate	1 Jan 1918	4 Feb 1934	Sir Malhar Rao Puar "Bhava Sahib" (s.a.)
Maharaja	British protectorate	4 Feb 1934	2 Dec 1943	Sadashiv Rao II Puar "Khase Sahib" (b. 1887 – d. 1943)
Maharaja	British protectorate	2 Dec 1943	15 Aug 1947	Yeshwant Rao Puar "Bhau Sahib" (b. 1905 – d. 1965) (from 14 Aug 1947, Sir Yeshwant Rao Puar)

Colonel HH Maharaja Sir Yeshwant Rao Puar had two daughters, 'Durgaraje' (d/o Padmaraje) who married into the Sardar Phalke family of Gwalior and 'Udayaraje' (d/o Maneka Raje) who married the Raja of Prayagpur.

== See also ==
- List of Maratha dynasties and states
- List of Indian princely states
