= Landed nobility =

Nobility privileged with landownership

Landed nobility or landed aristocracy is a category of nobility in the history of various countries, for which landownership was part of their noble privileges. The landed nobility show noblesse oblige, they have duty to fulfill their social responsibility. Their character depends on the country.

- The notion of landed gentry in the United Kingdom and Ireland varied over time.
- In Russian Empire landed nobles were called pomeshchiks, with the term literally translated as "estate owner".
- Junker is the landed nobility class of Prussia and eastern Germany.
- Landadel were the landed nobility of the Holy Roman Empire.
- In Poland, szlachta were usually landowners, with magnates being the class of the wealthiest szlachta. Middle and smaller landed szlachta was called ziemiaństwo/ziemianie (from the word ziemia, land), usually translated as landed gentry.
- In some places, e.g., in Low Countries before Spanish rule, urban nobility with landed estates was distinct from landed nobility. In general, relations between landed nobility and towns was very complex in Europe.

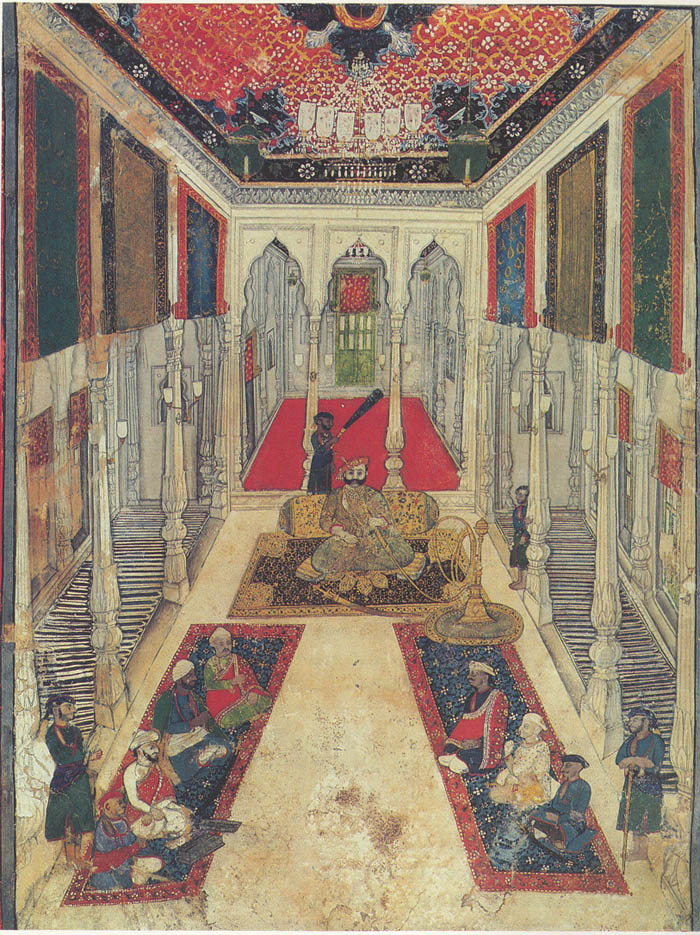
A Maratha Durbar showing the chief (Raja) and the nobles (Sardars, Jagirdars, Istamuradars & Mankaris) of the state.

- In India, jagirdars, zamindars, and mankaris were the landed aristocracies, which formed Indian feudalism. Sometimes, they were elevated to the status of 'princes' or 'royalty' owning princely states. Sometimes royal status was also reduced to the status of zamindars.
- In the Philippines, the Principalía was the ruling and usually educated upper class in the towns of the Spanish Philippines. The distinction or status of being part of the principalía was a hereditary right. This upper class was exempted from tribute (tax) to the Spanish crown during the colonial period. The principales (members of the principalía) traced their origin from the pre‑colonial royal and noble class of Datu and Lakan of the established kingdoms, rajahnates, confederacies, and principalities, as well as the lordships of the smaller ancient social units called barangays in Visayas, Luzon, and Mindanao. The members of this class enjoyed exclusive privileges, including the right to vote, be elected to public office, and be addressed by the title: Don or Doña.
- Within certain communities in Nigeria, the reigning monarchs (known as the traditional rulers) are often vested with inalienable landownership due to their positions, with them either owning tracts of land outright or holding them in trust for their states. Some communities don't follow this pattern, however. In the Kingdom of Lagos, for example, landownership is not traditionally vested in the Oba of Lagos, who is descended from later immigrants from the Kingdom of Benin, but is instead vested in the so-called Idejo class of titled aristocrats, who all claim descent from the earliest Yoruba settlers of Lagos.
- In the Americas, the planter class owned large plantations worked by slaves and indentured servants. While not a legally defined nobility, the American gentry constituted the planter class in the Thirteen Colonies and, later on, the United States.
