= Acala (disambiguation) =

Acala or Achala is a guardian deity primarily revered in Vajrayana Buddhism in Japan, China and elsewhere.

Acala may also refer to:

- Acalā, the eighth bhūmi, the eighth of the ten completion stages of the Bodhisattva path in Buddhism
- Acala Ch'ol, a former Ch'ol Maya territory of Guatemala
- Acala, Texas, a ghost town in Texas, US
- Acala, Chiapas, a town in Mexico
- Acala Municipality, Mexico

== See also ==
- Acalan, a Chontal Maya region in what is now southern Campeche, Mexico
- Himachal Pradesh, a state in northern India; lit. 'abode [achal] of snow [him]' in Sanskrit
- Achala Fort, Maharashtra, India
- Achala Sachdev (1920–2012), Indian actress
- Achala Moulik (born 1941), Indian writer
- Achal Bakeri, Indian entrepreneur
- Achal Das Bohra, Indian activist
- Achal Kumar Jyoti, 21st Chief Election Commissioner of India
- Achal Kumar Srivastava, Indian neurologist
- Seth Achal Singh, Indian independence activist and politician
- Anchal (disambiguation)
- Aanchal (disambiguation)
