= Konkan Diva Fort =

Ancient Indian fort

Konkandiva Fort
- Part of Sahyadri Hill Range
- Raigad district, Maharashtra
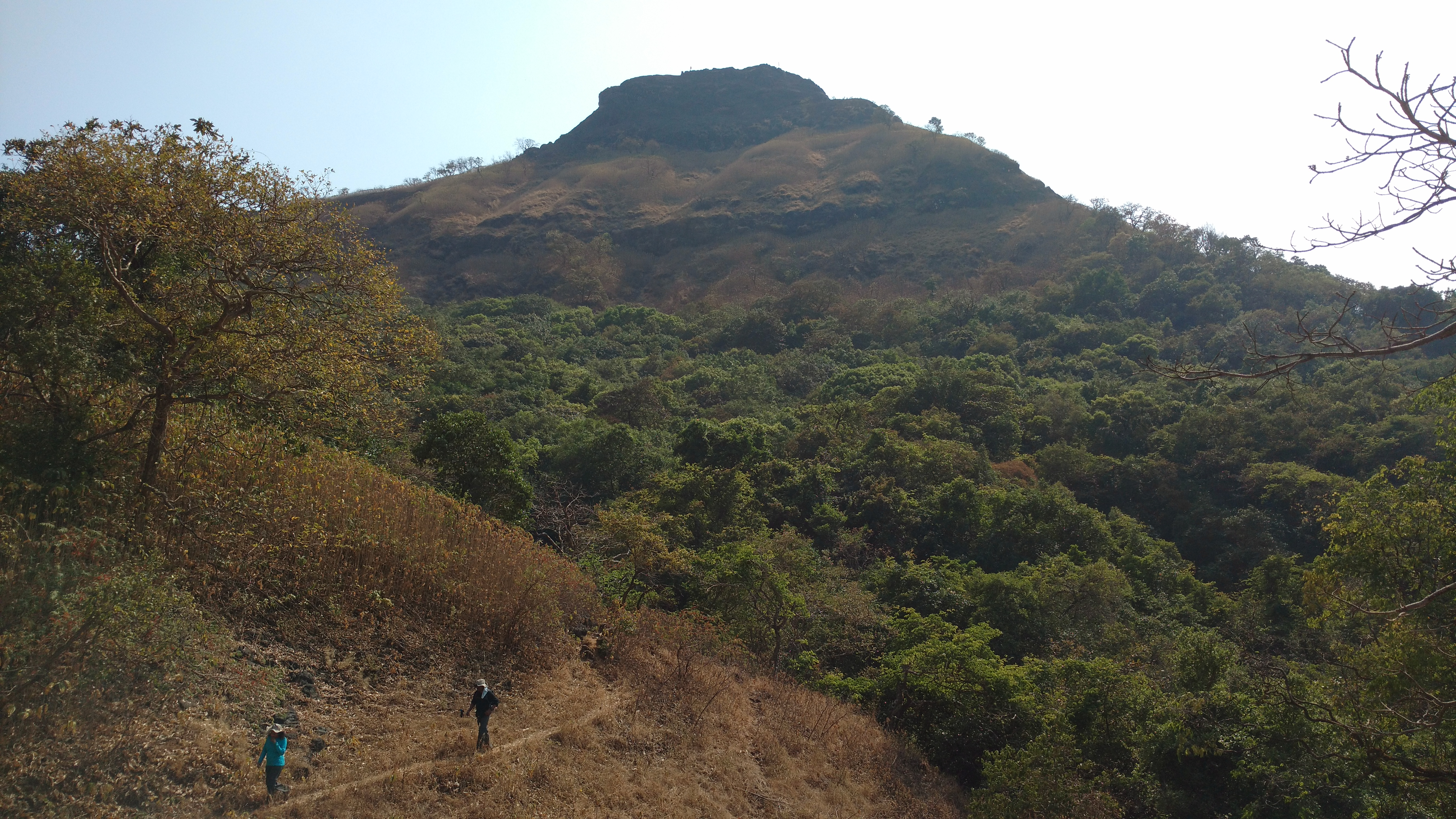
- Konkandiva fort

Site information
- Type: Hill fort
- Owner: Government of India
- Controlled by: Maratha Empire (1739–1818); United Kingdom: East India Company (1818–1857); British Raj (1857–1947); India (1947-)
- Open to the public: Yes
- Condition: Ruins

Location
- Shown within Maharashtra Konkandiva Fort (India)
- Coordinates: 18°17′39.2″N 73°25′21.8″E
- Height: 2953 Ft.

Site history
- Materials: Stone

Konkandiva Fort (transliteration: Konkandiva Qilа̄) is a fort located 70 km from Pune in Maharashtra. This fort is on the boundary of Raigad and Pune district. The fort was important as a surveillance fort to keep watch on the possible attack on the Raigad fort through Ghol Village side along the Mutha river.

== How to reach ==
There are two routes to reach the fort. The route from Konkan region is tough and the nearest town is Mahad which is 61 km from Mumbai. The base village of the fort is Sandoshi which is 32 km from Mahad. There are good hotels at Mahad. The trekking path passes through the kavlya ghat hillock north of the Sandoshi. The second route starts from Village Gajarewadi which is near Ghol in Pune district. This route is very safe and wide. Both the routes meet at a col on the northern side of the fort. The trek path is then steep and requires efforts to climb in rainy season. The villagers from the local village Gajrewadi make night stay and food arrangements at a reasonable cost.

== Places to see ==
There is a cave and a few rock-cut water cisterns on the fort to be seen.

== Gallery ==
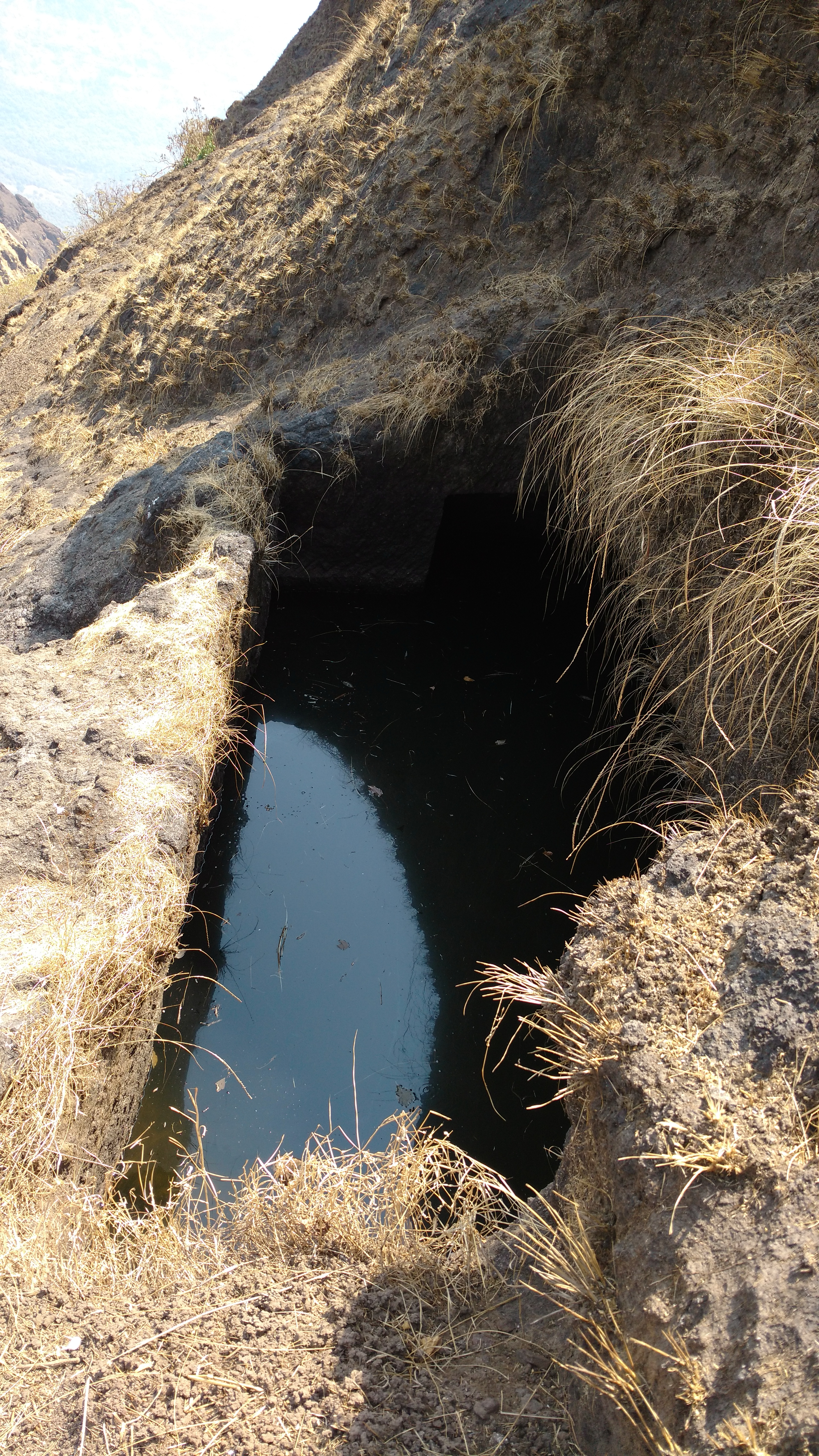
Rockcut water cistern

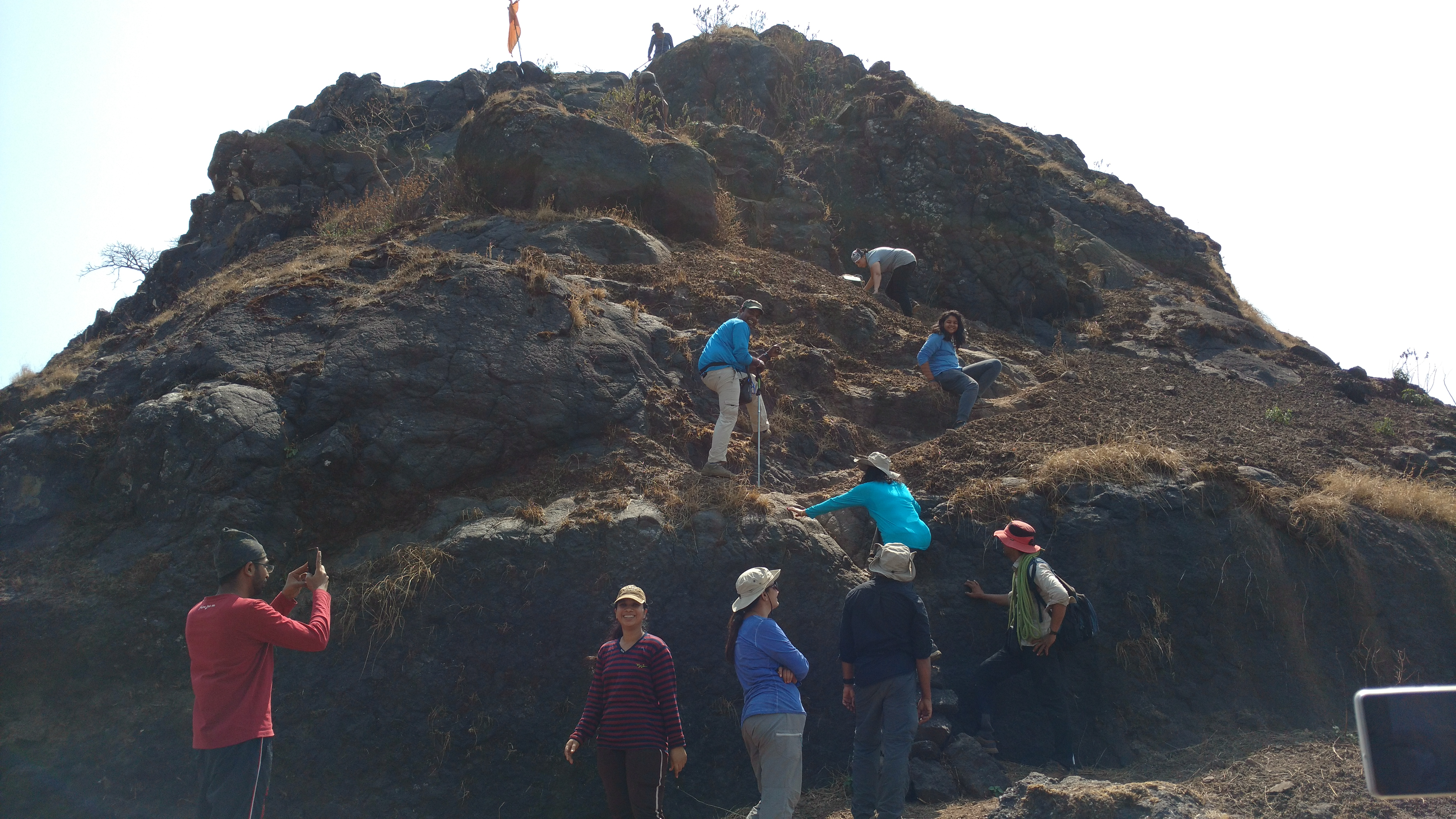
Climbing the last rock patch

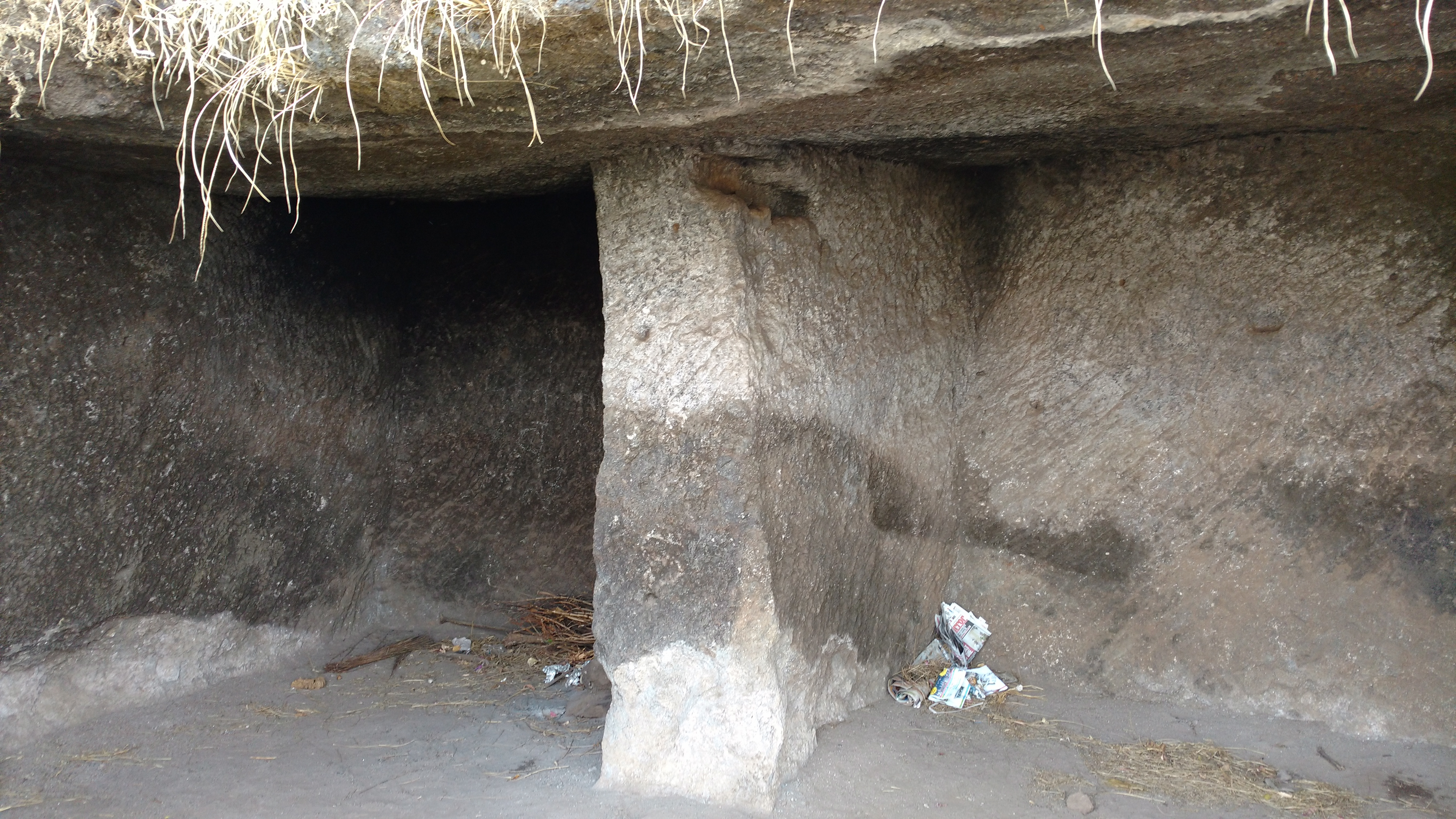
Rockcut caves on the fort

== See also ==
- List of forts in Maharashtra
- List of forts in India
- Marathi People
- List of Maratha dynasties and states
- Maratha Army
- Maratha titles
- Military history of India
