= Achala Fort =

Fort in Maharashtra

- Part of Ajintha Satmal Hill Range
- Nashik district, Maharashtra

Site information
- Type: Hill fort
- Owner: IndiaGovernment of India
- Controlled by: Ahmadnagar (1521-1594); Maratha Empire (1670-1676); Mughal Empire(1676-1754); Maratha Empire (1754-1818); United Kingdom: East India Company (1818-1857); British Raj (1857-1947); India (1947-)
- Open to the public: Yes
- Condition: Ruins

Location
- Shown within Maharashtra
- Location within Maharashtra
- Coordinates: 20°25′54.2″N 73°48′54.9″E
- Height: 4,024 ft (1,227 m)

Site history
- Materials: Stone

Achala Fort is a westernmost fort in the Satmala hill range. It is located 55 km from Nashik, in Nashik district, of Maharashtra. This fort is adjoining the Ahivant Fort. The three forts Achala, Ahivant, and Mohandar are very close by. The Achala and Mohandar forts were constructed to guard the Ahivant fort. Captain Briggs has described it as a large hill, whose ascent is very easy till it reaches the top where it is very steep.

== History ==
In 1636 this fort was under the control of Adilshah. The Moghul Emperor Shahjahan sent one of his generals, Shaista Khan, and instructed him to win all the forts in Nashik region. Alivardi Khan was a cavalier of Shaista Khan who won the fort. In 1670, the Maratha King chhatrapati Shivaji Maharaj won the fort from the Moghuls. The Mughal Emperor, Aurangzeb, sent his chieftain Mahabat Khan to win the fort. Mahabat Khan and Diler Khan opened a battle front from either side of the fort. The attack was so fierce that the Ahivant fort was surrendered to Moghuls. Subsequently, the Achala fort was also surrendered. In 1818 the fort was surrendered to Colonel Briggs along with other 17 forts after the fall of Trymbak fort.

== How to reach ==
The nearest town is Vani which is 44 km from Nashik. The base village of the fort is Dagad Pimpri which is 13 km from Vani. There are good hotels at Vani. The trekking path starts from the hillock north of the Dagad Pimpri. The route is very safe and wide. There are no trees on the trekking route. It takes about one hour to reach the col between the two forts. The right path goes to Ahivant fort and the left path goes to Achala fort. The night stay on the fort cannot be made due to lack of potable water on the fort. The villagers from the local village make night stay and food arrangements at a reasonable cost. The other route is from Daregaon.

== Places to see ==
The Achala fort is occupied on a small hill. There are few ruins of buildings, store houses and water tanks that can be seen on the fort. It takes about half an hour to encircle the fort.

== See also ==
- List of forts in Maharashtra
- List of forts in India
- Shaista Khan
- Marathi People
- List of Maratha dynasties and states
- Maratha War of Independence
- Battles involving the Maratha Empire
- Maratha Army
- Maratha titles
- Military history of India
