= Salute state =

Princely state under the British Raj

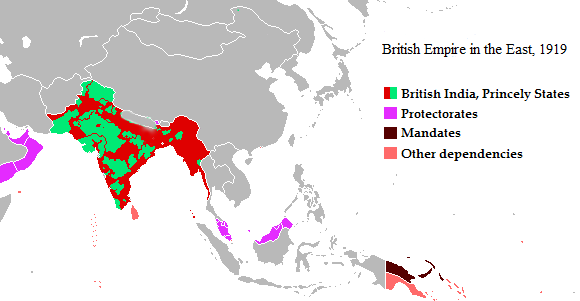
British Empire in the East

A salute state was a princely state under the British Raj that had been granted a gun salute by the British Crown (as paramount ruler); i.e., the protocolary privilege for its ruler to be greeted—originally by Royal Navy ships, later also on land—with a number of cannon shots, in graduations of two salutes from three to 21, as recognition of the state's relative status. The gun-salute system of recognition was first instituted during the time of the East India Company in the late 18th century and was continued under direct Crown rule from 1858.

As with the other princely states, the salute states varied greatly in size and importance. The states of Hyderabad and Jammu and Kashmir, both with a 21-gun salute, were each over 200,000 square kilometres (77,000 sq mi) in size, or slightly larger than the whole of Great Britain; in 1941, Hyderabad had a population of over 16,000,000, comparable to the population of Romania at the time, while Jammu and Kashmir had a population of slightly over 4 million, comparable to that of Switzerland. At the other end of the scale, Janjira and Sachin (11 and 9 guns, respectively, and both ruled by branches of the same dynasty) were respectively 137 and 127 square kilometres (53 and 49 sq mi) in size, or slightly larger than the island of Jersey; in 1941, Janjira had a population of nearly 14,000, the smallest of the salute states on the subcontinent.

For varying periods of time, a number of salute states in South Asia (Afghanistan), on the Indian subcontinent (Nepal, Bhutan, Sikkim) or in the Middle East (the Gulf/Trucial States and various states in the Aden Protectorate) were also under the British Raj as protectorates or protected states. As with the Indian principalities, those states received varying numbers of gun salutes and varied tremendously in terms of autonomy. Afghanistan and Nepal were both British protected states from the 19th century until 1921 and 1923, respectively, after which they were sovereign nations in direct relations with the British Foreign Office; while protected states, both enjoyed autonomy in internal affairs, though control of foreign affairs was left to the British. The states under the Persian Gulf Residency and the Aden Protectorate (part of the Bombay Presidency until 1937) ranged from Oman, a 21-gun-rated sultanate under a limited protectorate, to the 3-gun Trucial States which were near-total protectorates.

Following their independence in 1947, the new Indian and Pakistani governments maintained the gun-salute system until 1971 (in India) and 1972 (in Pakistan), when the former ruling families were officially derecognised. The Aden Protectorate was transferred to the control of the British Foreign Office in 1937 and eventually became the independent state of South Yemen in 1967, resulting in the abolition of its salute states the same year. Just prior to Indian independence in 1947, the Persian Gulf Residency was likewise transferred to Foreign Office control, remaining in existence until the Trucial States became fully independent in December 1971, forming the United Arab Emirates (UAE) in early 1972.

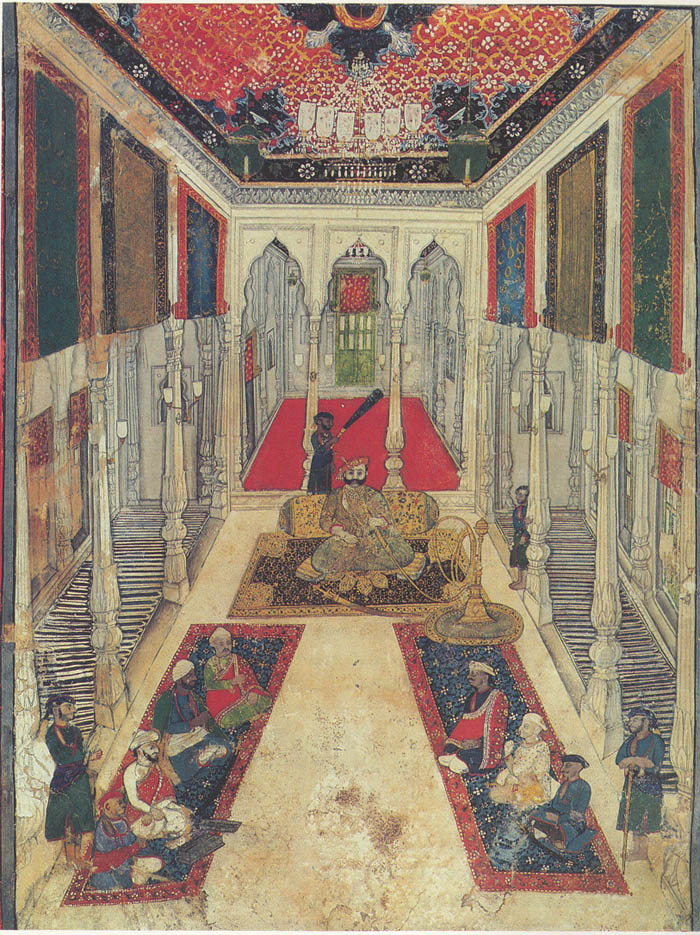
A Maratha Durbar showing the Chief (Raja) and the nobles (Sardars, Jagirdars, Istamuradars & Mankaris) of the state.

== Salute states and equivalents ==
When the ruler of a princely state arrived at the Indian capital (originally at Calcutta (Kolkata), then at Delhi), he was greeted with a number of gun-firings. The number of these consecutive "gun salutes" changed from time to time, be increased or reduced depending on the degree of honour which the British chose to accord to a given ruler. The number of gun salutes accorded to a ruler was usually a reflection of the state of his relations with the British and/or his perceived degree of political power; a 21-gun salute was considered the highest. The King (or Queen) of the United Kingdom (who until 1948 was also the Emperor of India) was accorded a 101-gun salute, and 31 guns were used to salute the Viceroy of India.

The number of guns in a salute assumed particular importance at the time of holding of the Coronation Durbar in Delhi in the month of December 1911. The Durbar was held to commemorate the Coronation of King George V with guns firing almost all day. At that time rulers of three princely states were given 21-gun salutes. These were:

- The Maharaja Gaekwad of Baroda State
- The Maharaja of Mysore
- The Nizam of Hyderabad

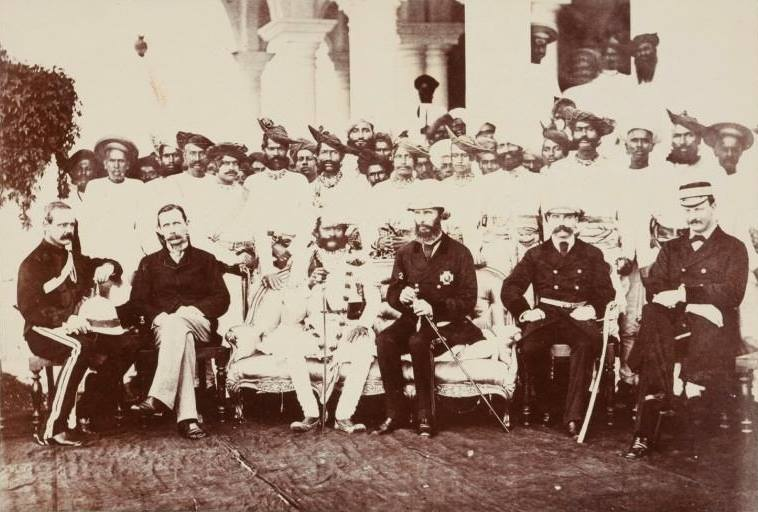
HH Maharaja Sir Jayaji Rao Scindia of Gwalior State, General Sir Henry Daly (Founder of The Daly College), with British officers and Maratha nobility (Sardars, Jagirdars & Mankaris) in Indore, Holkar State, c. 1879.

In 1917, the Maharaja Scindia of Gwalior was upgraded to a permanent and hereditary 21-gun salute, and the Maharaja of Jammu and Kashmir was granted the same in 1921. Both were granted the increased ranks as a result of the meritorious services of their soldiers in the First World War.

Apart from these five, no other princely state received a 21-gun salute. Three of the most prominent princes, however, enjoyed a local salute of 21 guns within the limits of their own state and 19 guns in the rest of India. They were the Nawab (Begum) of Bhopal, the Maharaja Holkar of Indore and the Maharana of Udaipur.

The Nizam, Maharajas, Princes, etc. were all deeply keen on protocol and ensured that it was practised as a matter of faith. Any departure from it was not taken kindly by them. Salute of guns was one such protocol that was strictly followed.

=== Classifications and sub-classifications of salute states ===
At the time of Indian independence and partition in 1947, 118 (113 in India, 4 in Pakistan, plus Sikkim) of the roughly 565 princely states were classified as "salute states."

- The rulers of the five premier states – Hyderabad State, Gwalior State, Mysore, Baroda, and Jammu & Kashmir– received 21-gun salutes.
- The rulers of six others – Bhopal, Indore, Udaipur, Kolhapur, Travancore, and Kalat – received 19-gun salutes.
- Seventy-seven were entitled to gun salutes ranging from 17 to 11 guns, with additional gun-salutes granted on a local or personal basis.
- The remaining 30 received a salute of nine guns.
- Eighty-eight rulers with gun salutes of 11 guns or above, whether the salute was hereditary or local only, were entitled to the style of Highness.
- In 1918, the Nizam of Hyderabad was granted the unique style of Exalted Highness, in recognition of the state's contributions to the Allied war effort during the First World War.
- In 1948, all rulers of nine-gun salute states were also granted the style of Highness.

The salute states were broadly divided into two categories: the five premier states with a permanent 21-gun salute and with an individual resident, or envoy, stationed in each, and the remaining 113 states incorporated within political agencies (groups of states) under a political agent. The salutes were themselves organised in a strict hierarchy. Each ruling house of a salute state was entitled to a permanent hereditary salute. In some instances, one of three sub-categories consisting of an increase of 2 gun salutes could be awarded as follows:

- Personal and local: Hereditary to an individual state's ruler only within its borders, and personally to the ruler outside his state, but honouring his person and not the state when he was outside it. An award of a personal salute was only for the lifetime of the ruler, and was typically made for distinguished wartime or civic service.
- Personal: Only for the ruler personally, and not to distinguish his state as a whole.
- Local: Hereditary to an individual state's ruler only within its borders.

As a religious head, the Aga Khan received a personal 11-gun salute. In certain cases, a ruler of a non-salute state or a junior member of a princely family could merit a personal salute or the personal style of Highness.

== Salutes within the Indian Empire (royals, administrators, and officers, as of 1947) ==
Number of guns	Recipients
101 (Imperial Salute)	The Emperor of India (Note: Only if present in person (in 1911, at that year's Coronation Durbar in Delhi).)
31 (Royal Salute) (Note: Also on the occasions of the Sovereign's Birthday, the Accession and Coronation Anniversaries, when an Imperial Proclamation was delivered and for the Birthday of a Empress (as Royal Consort). There were two periods when two Empresses of India were living: from 1910 to 1925 (Empress Mary of Teck and Empress Dowager Alexandra of Denmark, who died in 1925), and from 1936 until Indian independence in 1947 (former Empress Dowager Mary of Teck died in 1953).)	The Empress and the Members of the Royal Family (Note: On arriving or departing from a military station, or when attending a state ceremony.); The Viceroy and Governor-General of India; The King of Nepal (Shah Dynasty)
21	Heads of state.; Foreign sovereigns and members of their families.
19	Heads of government.; Governors-General; Governor-General of Portuguese India; Ambassadors; Commander-in-Chief, India (holding the rank of Field Marshal) (Note: On assuming or relinquishing office, or on a public arrival or departure from a military station and on formal ceremonial occasions. Also for a private arrival or departure from a military station (optional, if desired).); Admirals of the Fleet, Field Marshals and Marshals of the Royal Air Force
17	Governors of the Bombay, Madras and Bengal Presidencies; Governors of Indian Provinces; Governors of Colonies; Governor of French India; Envoys Extraordinary and Ministers Plenipotentiary; Commander-in-Chief, India (holding the rank of General); Admirals, Generals and Air Chief Marshals
15	Lieutenant-Governors of Indian Provinces; Lieutenant-Governors of Colonies; Plenipotentiaries and Envoys; Ministers Resident; Commander-in-Chief, East Indies Fleet (Note: As a vice-admiral, with two guns added.); Flag Officer Commanding Royal Indian Navy (rank of Vice-Admiral) (Note: From the shore battery, on public arrival for the first time at an Indian port.); Air Officer Commanding-in-Chief, Air Forces in India (rank of Air Marshal) (Note: On assuming or relinquishing office. Provided the AOC-in-C is the most senior military officer in the area, on a public arrival or departure from a military station and on formal ceremonial occasions; also for a private arrival or departure from a military station (optional, if desired), if seniority condition fulfilled.); Army Commanders with the rank of Lieutenant-General (Note: On assuming or relinquishing office, or on a public arrival or departure from a military station and on formal ceremonial occasions. Also for a private arrival or departure from a military station (optional, if desired). Only if the senior officer present and in actual command.); Vice-Admirals, Lieutenant-Generals and Air Marshals
13	Chief Commissioners of Indian Provinces; Residents (1st Class); Residents (2nd Class); Flag Officer Commanding Royal Indian Navy (rank of Rear-Admiral); Air Officer Commanding-in-Chief, Air Forces in India (rank of Air Vice-Marshal); Major Generals commanding Districts; Rear-Admirals, Major-Generals and Air Vice-Marshals
11	Political Agents; Consuls-General; Charges d'Affaires; Resident Advisor at Makallah (local only); Brigade Commanders (including Major-Generals if commanding a Brigade); Commodores, Brigadiers and Air Commodores
9	Governor of Daman; Governor of Diu (Portuguese India)

== Salute states that acceded to India ==
At independence in 1947, the gun salutes enjoyed by the 112 states that acceded to the Union of India were as follows:

Serial No.	Hereditary salute No. of guns	Personal or local salute No. of guns	Title of Ruler	Name of state	Clan of Ruler	Present Location
1.	21	–	The Maharaja Gaekwad of	(Baroda State) Baroda	Maratha, Gaekwad	Gujarat
2.	21	–	The Maharaja of	(Kingdom of Mysore) Mysore	Kannadiga, Wadiyar	Karnataka
3.	21	–	The Maharaja Scindia of	(Gwalior State) Gwalior	Maratha, Scindia	Madhya Pradesh
4.	21	–	The Maharaja of	(Jammu and Kashmir (princely state)) Jammu and Kashmir	Rajput, Dogra	Jammu and Kashmir
5.	21	–	The Nizam of	(Hyderabad State) Hyderabad	Turkic, Asaf Jahi	Telangana, Karnataka, and Maharashtra
6.	19	21 (local)	The Nawab of	(Bhopal State) Bhopal	Pashtun, Afghan	Madhya Pradesh
7.	19	21 (local)	The Maharaja Holkar of	Indore	Maratha, Holkar	Madhya Pradesh
8.	19	21 (local)	The Maharana of	Udaipur (Mewar)	Rajput, Sisodia	Rajasthan
9.	19	21 (local)	The Maharaja Chhatrapati of	(Kolhapur State) Kolhapur	Maratha, Bhonsle	Maharashtra
10.	19	21 (local)	The Maharaja of	Travancore	Nair, Samantan Nair	Kerala
11.	17		The Maharao of	Kotah	Rajput, Chauhan, Hada	Rajasthan
12.	17	19 (local)	The Maharaja of	(Bharatpur State) Bharatpur	Jat, Sinsinwar	Rajasthan
13.	17	19 (local)	The Maharaja of	(Bikaner State) Bikaner	Rajput, Rathore	Rajasthan
14.	17	19 (local)	The Maharao of	Cutch	Rajput, Jadeja	Gujarat
15.	17	19 (local)	The Maharaja Sawai of	(Jaipur State) Jaipur	Rajput, Kachwaha	Rajasthan
16.	17	19 (local)	The Maharaja of	(Jodhpur State) Jodhpur	Rajput, Rathore	Rajasthan
17.	17		The Maharaja of	Pudukkottai	Thondaiman	Tamil Nadu
18.	17	19 (local)	The Maharaja of	(Patiala State) Patiala	Jat Sikh, Sidhu, Phulkian Misl	Punjab
19.	17	–	The Maharao Raja of	(Bundi State) Bundi	Rajput, Chauhan, Hada	Rajasthan
20	17	–	The Maharaja of	Cochin	Kshatriya, Chandravamsha	Kerala
20.	17	–	The Maharaja of	(Karauli State) Karauli	Rajput Jadaun	Rajasthan
22.	17	–	The Nawab of	(Tonk State) Tonk	Pathan	Rajasthan
23.	15	17 (personal)	The Maharaj Rana of	(Dholpur State) Dholpur	Jat Bamraolia	Rajasthan
15.	15	17 (local)	The Maharaja of	Rewa	Rajput Baghel	Madhya Pradesh
24.	15	17 (local)	The Maharaja of	Alwar	Rajput, Kachwaha	Rajasthan
25.	15	–	The Maharawal of	(Banswara State) Banswara	Rajput, Sisodia	Rajasthan
26.	15	17 (personal)	The Maharaja of	Datia	Rajput, Bundela	Madhya Pradesh
27.	15	–	The Maharaja of	Dewas Senior	Maratha, Puar	Madhya Pradesh
28.	15	–	The Maharaja of	Dewas Junior	Maratha, Puar	Madhya Pradesh
29.	15	–	The Maharaja of	Dhar	Maratha, Puar	Madhya Pradesh
30.	15	–	The Maharawal of	(Dungarpur State) Dungarpur	Rajput Guhilot	Rajasthan
31	15	–	The Maharaja of	(Idar State) Idar	Rajput Rathore	Gujarat
32	15	–	The Maharawal of	(Jaisalmer State) Jaisalmer	Rajput, Bhati	Rajasthan
33	15	–	The Maharaja of	(Kishangarh State) Kishangarh	Rajput, Rathore	Rajasthan
34	15	–	The Maharaja of	(Orchha State) Orchha	Rajput, Bundela	Madhya Pradesh
35	15	–	The Maharawat of	Pratapgarh	Rajput, Sisodia	Rajasthan
36	15	–	The Nawab of	(Rampur State) Rampur	Rohilla Sayyid	Uttar Pradesh
37	15	–	The Maharaol of	Sirohi	Rajput, Chauhan, Devda	Rajasthan
38	13	15 (local)	The Maharaja of	Benares	Bhumihar, Gautam	Uttar Pradesh
39	13	15 (local)	The Maharaja of	Bhavnagar	Rajput, Gohil	Gujarat
40	13	15 (personal and local)	The Maharaja of	Jind	Sikh Jat, Sidhu, Phulkian Misl	Haryana
41	13	15 (personal and local)	The Nawab of	Junagadh	Babi	Gujarat
42	13	15 (personal and local)	The Maharaja of	(Kapurthala State) Kapurthala	Ahluwalia (a Sikh misl)	Punjab
43	13	15 (local)	The Raja of	(Nabha State) Nabha	Jat Sikh, Sidhu, Phulkian Misl	Punjab
44	13	15 (local)	The Maharaja Jam Sahib of	Nawanagar	Rajput, Jadeja	Gujarat
45	13	15 (local)	The Maharaja of	Ratlam	Rajput, Rathore	Madhya Pradesh
46	13	–	The Maharaja of	(Koch Bihar) Cooch Behar	Rajput, Rajvanshi	West Bengal
47	13	15 (local)	The Maharaja Raj Sahib of	(Dhrangadhra State) Dhrangadhra	Rajput, Jhala	Gujarat
48	13	–	The Nawab of	Jaora	Pathan	Madhya Pradesh
49	13	–	The Maharaj Rana of	(Jhalawar State) Jhalawar	Rajput, Jhala	Rajasthan
50	13	–	The Nawab of	(Palanpur State) Palanpur	Afghan	Gujarat
51	13	–	The Maharaja Rana Sahib of	Porbandar	Rajput, Jethwa	Gujarat
52	13	–	The Maharana of	Rajpipla	Rajput, Gohil	Gujarat
53	13	–	The Maharaja of	Tripura	Manikya	Tripura
54	11	13 (local)	The Nawab of	Janjira	Siddi	Maharashtra
55	11	–	The Maharaja of	(Ajaigarh State) Ajaigarh	Rajput, Bundela	Madhya Pradesh
56	11	–	The Maharana Raja of	(Alirajpur State) Alirajpur	Rajput, Sisodia	Madhya Pradesh
57	11	–	The Nawab of	Baoni	Asaf Jahi	Madhya Pradesh
58	11	–	The Rana of	Barwani	Rajput, Sisodia	Madhya Pradesh
59	11	–	The Sawai Maharaja of	Bijawar	Rajput, Bundela	Madhya Pradesh
60	11	–	The Nawab of	Cambay	Najm i Sani	Gujarat
61	11	–	The Raja of	Chamba	Rajput	Himachal Pradesh
62	11	–	The Maharaja of	Charkhari	Rajput, Bundela	Madhya Pradesh
63	11	–	The Maharaja of	Chhatarpur	Rajput, Parmar	Madhya Pradesh
64	11	–	The Raja of	(Faridkot State) Faridkot	Sikh Jat, Brar	Punjab
65	11	–	The Maharaja of	Gondal	Rajput, Jadeja	Gujarat
66	11	–	The Raja of	(Kahlur) Bilaspur	Rajput	Himachal Pradesh
67	11	–	The Raja of	Jhabua	Rajput Rathore	Madhya Pradesh
68	11	–	The Nawab of	Maler Kotla	Afghan	Punjab
69	11	–	The Raja of	Mandi	Rajput Chandravanshi	Himachal Pradesh
70	11	–	The Maharaja of	Manipur	Meitei people	Manipur
71	11	–	The Maharaja of	Morvi	Rajput Jadeja	Gujarat
72	11	–	The Raja of	(Narsinghgarh State) Narsinghgarh	Rajput Umat	Madhya Pradesh
73	11	–	The Maharaja of	Panna	Rajput Bundela	Madhya Pradesh
74	11	-	The Nawab of	Radhanpur	Irani	Gujarat
75	11	–	The Raja of	Rajgarh	Hindu, Rajput	Madhya Pradesh
76	11	–	The Raja of	Raigarh	Rajput Raghuvanshi	Himachal Pradesh
77	11	-	The Raja of	Sailana	Rajput Rathore	Madhya Pradesh
78	11	–	The Maharaja of	(Samthar State) Samthar	Gurjar Khatana	Uttar Pradesh
79	11	–	The Maharaja of	Sirmur	Rajput, Bhati	Himachal Pradesh
80	11	–	The Raja of	Sitamau	Rajput Rathore	Madhya Pradesh
81	11	–	The Raja of	Suket	Rajput Chandravanshi	Himachal Pradesh
82	11	–	The Maharaja of	(Garhwal Kingdom) Tehri Garhwal	Rajput, Parmar	Uttarakhand
83	11	–	The Maharana Raj Sahib of	Wankaner	Rajput, Jhala	Gujarat
84	9	11 (personal)	The Raja of	Baria	Rajput, Chauhan	Gujarat
85	9	11 (personal)	The Raja of	Dharampur	Rajput, Sisodia	Gujarat
86	9	11 (personal)	The Raja of	(Sangli State) Sangli	Maratha, Brahmin administrators (Patwardhan)	Maharashtra
87	9	11 (local)	The Raja of	Sawantwadi	Maratha, Bhonsle	Maharashtra
88	9	–	The Thakur Sahib of	Wadhwan	Rajput Jhala	Gujarat
89	9	–	The Nawab Babi of	Balasinor	Babi	Gujarat
90	9	–	The Nawab of	(Banganapalle State) Banganapalle	Najm i Sani	Andhra Pradesh
91	9	–	The Maharawal of	Bansda	Rajput Solanki	Gujarat
92	9	–	The Raja of	Baraundha	Rajput Bargurjar	Madhya Pradesh
93	9	–	The Raja of	(Bhor State) Bhor	Maratha, Brahmin	Maharashtra
94	9	–	The Raja of	Chhota Udaipur	Rajput, Chauhan	Gujarat
95	9	–	The Maharana of	Danta	Rajput, Parmar	Gujarat
96	9	–	The Thakore Sahib of	Dhrol	Rajput, Jadeja	Gujarat
97	9		The Maharaja of	(Jawhar State) Jawhar	Maratha, Mahadeo Koli (Mukne)	Maharashtra
98	9	–	The Maharaja of	Kalahandi (Karond)	Nagavanshi	Odisha
99	9	–	The Rao of	Khilchipur	Rajput, Chauhan,(Khinchi)	Madhya Pradesh
100	9	–	The Thakore Sahib of	Limbdi	Rajput, Jhala	Gujarat
101	9	–	The Nawab of	Loharu	(Muslim)	Haryana
102	9	–	The Maharana of	Lunavada	Rajput, Solanki	Gujarat
103	9	–	The Raja of	Maihar	Rajput, Kachwaha	Madhya Pradesh
104	9	–	The Maharaja of	Mayurbhanj	Bhanja	Odisha
105	9	–	The Raja of	(Mudhol State) Mudhol	Maratha, Ghorpade	Karnataka
106	9	–	The Raja of	Nagod	Rajput, Parihar	Madhya Pradesh
107	9	–	The Thakore Sahib of	Palitana	Rajput, Gohil	Gujarat
108	9	–	The Maharaja of	(Patna State) Patna	Rajput, Chauhan	Odisha
109	9	–	The Thakore Sahib of	(Rajkot State) Rajkot	Rajput, Jadeja	Gujarat
110	9	–	The Nawab of	Sachin	Siddi	Gujarat
111	9	11 (local)	The Maharana of	Sant	Rajput, Parmar	Gujarat
112	9		The Rajadhiraj of	Shahpura	Rajput, Sisodia	Rajasthan

The system of gun salutes continued in the Republic of India until 1971.

Although salutes with many more guns have been used for Western Monarchs (and dynastic and other associated occasions), the 21-gun salute has in modern times become customary for Sovereign Monarchs (hence also known as 'royal salute') and republic.

Some of the rulers not listed above were granted increased gun salutes after the independence, e.g. the Maharana of Mewar (at Udaipur, Maharajpramukh in Rajasthan) was raised to first place in the Order of Precedence, displacing the Nizam of Hyderabad and Berar, and all 9-gun states were permitted the use of the style of Highness. However, it has not been possible to obtain complete details for all the rulers.

This system continued till 1971 when privileges and Privy Purses of ex-rulers were abolished by the Government of India.

== Salute states that acceded to Pakistan ==
Between August 1947 and March 1948, thirteen Muslim princely states in western India acceded to the new Dominion of Pakistan, created from British India by the Indian Independence Act 1947, thus becoming the Princely states of Pakistan. Between 1955 and 1974, they were all amalgamated into larger federations and provinces. All of the princely states were in the western part of the country, so all were merged into the eventual West Pakistan, which constitutes (since the breakaway of Bangla Desh) the present-day Republic of Pakistan.

The states retained internal autonomy so long as they existed, but all had lost this by 1974. The styles and titles enjoyed by the former ruling families ceased to be officially recognised by the Government of Pakistan, mostly in January 1972, with the exception of the small states of Hunza and Nagar, which were shortly after incorporated into the Northern Areas of Pakistan in October 1974.

Four salute states acceded to Pakistan between 3 October 1947 and 27 March 1948. In order of precedence, they were as follows:

Serial No.	Hereditary salute No. of guns	Personal or local salute No. of guns	Title of Ruler	Name of state	Clan of Ruler	Present Location
1.	19	–	The Khan of	Kalat	Muslim Balochi	Balochistan
2.	17	–	The Nawab of	(Bahawalpur (princely state)) Bahawalpur	Muslim Abbasi	Punjab
3.	15	17 (local)	The Mir of	Khairpur	Muslim Balochi	Sindh
4.	11	–	The Mehtar of	Chitral	Muslim Katoor	Khyber Pakhtunkhwa

After several promotions and two further post-colonial awarding under the republic – which India did not do – the gun salutes enjoyed by the states in Pakistan were as follows in 1966:

- Hereditary salute of 19-guns (promoted): the Amir of Bahawalpur
- Hereditary salute of 19-guns: the Khan of Kalat
- Hereditary salute of 17-guns (promoted): the Mir of Khairpur
- Hereditary salute of 15-guns: the Mir of Hunza (granted by President Ayub Khan in 1966, previously non-salute)
- Hereditary salute of 15-guns: the Wali of Swat (granted by President Ayub Khan in 1966, previously non-salute)
- Hereditary salute of 11-guns: the Mehtar of Chitral

== Salute states in Burma ==
- 9 guns (permanent, for rulers of the following Shan States):
  - The Saopha of Kengtung
  - The Saopha of Hsipaw
  - The Saopha of Mong Nai
  - The Saopha of Yawnghwe

== Protectorates and protected states under the Indian Empire ==
The following list of gun salutes is as they stood in 1947.

=== South Asia ===
Hereditary salute No. of guns	Personal or local salute No. of guns	Title of Ruler	Name of state	Clan of Ruler	Present Location
21	–	The King of (Note: Styled as His Highness The Emir of Afghanistan until 1905, when the emirate was recognised as a kingdom, with full sovereignty in 1921. The monarchy was deposed in 1973.)	(Emirate of Afghanistan) Afghanistan	Barakzai	Afghanistan

In 1890, Abdur Rahman Khan, the Emir of Afghanistan, accepted for his kingdom the status of a British protected state under the British Raj, retaining internal autonomy while placing the state's foreign affairs under British control. In 1905, his son and successor, Habibullah Khan, negotiated the Anglo-Afghan Treaty with the British, by which Afghanistan was de jure styled as a sovereign monarchy and the ruler recognised as King of Afghanistan (Shah-e-Afghanistan) with the style of His Majesty, while remaining a protected state of Britain. In May 1919, King Habibullah's successor, King Amanullah, declared the country a wholly sovereign kingdom, which resulted in the Third Anglo-Afghan War. Despite a British victory, the British recognised the total sovereignty of Afghanistan in the Anglo-Afghan Treaty of Kabul in 1921; thereafter, Afghanistan continued to exist as a sovereign monarchy until the fall of the monarchy in 1973.

Hereditary salute No. of guns	Personal or local salute No. of guns	Title of Ruler	Name of state	Clan of Ruler	Present Location
31	51	The Maharajadhiraja of (Note: Styled as His Majesty the Maharajadhiraja of Nepal until 1919, when Nepal was recognised as a sovereign kingdom. The monarchy was abolished in 2008.)	(Kingdom of Nepal) Nepal	Shah dynasty	Nepal
21 (Note: Permanent, but only in the Maharaja's capacity as Prime Minister of Nepal, when representing the Nepalese monarch outside the country.)	31	The Shree Teen Maharajah of (Note: Semi-sovereign status; until 1951, when the dynasty was deposed and the monarchy abolished.)	Lamjang and Kaski	Rana dynasty	Nepal

The Anglo-Nepalese War of 1816, which led to the defeat of the Gorkha Shah monarchy of Nepal, resulted in the kingdom becoming a de jure protectorate, but a de facto protected state of the East India Company. Following the Indian Rebellion of 1857 and the dissolution of the East India Company in 1858, the protectorate was transferred to the British crown through the British Raj, which recognised the monarch as "King of Nepal" with the style of His Majesty in 1919 and the Rana Maharaja was styled as His Highness, due to the country's contributions to the Allied cause in the First World War. In 1923, the British government ended its protectorate and recognised Nepal as a wholly sovereign monarchy. While the semi-sovereign Rana oligarchy held power as hereditary Shree Teen Maharajas of Nepal until its deposition in 1951, the Nepalese monarchy continued until its abolition in 2008.

Hereditary salute No. of guns	Personal or local salute No. of guns	Title of Ruler	Name of state	Clan of Ruler	Present Location
15 (Note: 15 guns (personal) by the British government in December 1903; made permanent in June 1911. Promoted to a permanent salute of 19 guns in June 1955 by the Government of India; raised to 21 guns in 1963.)	–	The Maharaja Druk Gyalpo of (Note: Until 1963, when Bhutan declared itself a sovereign kingdom and converted the style to H.M. the Druk Gyalpo)	Bhutan	Wangchuck	Bhutan

A brief war between Bhutan and the British Raj in 1864 resulted in the Treaty of Sinchula, which forced Bhutan to relinquish territory and defined its relationship with the British. A loose agglomeration of semi-independent districts until 1907, Bhutan was unified in that year as a hereditary monarchy represented by Ugyen Wangchuck, the penlop (or governor) of the district of Tongsa, who was proclaimed the Maharaja and Druk Gyalpo (Dragon King) of Bhutan. In 1910, Bhutan signed the Treaty of Punakha, under which the British Raj guaranteed Bhutan's internal sovereignty, but, as with Sikkim, maintained control over its foreign relations. A British residency was officially installed in Bhutan, with a resident deputed from the Indian Political Service and answerable to the British government in India. The treaty, which established Bhutanese sovereignty, albeit as a protected state, remained in force until Indian independence in 1947; at this time, Bhutan was offered the options of remaining independent or acceding to the new Indian Union. Choosing to maintain its independence, Bhutan formally established relations with India in 1949, signing the India-Bhutan Treaty of Friendship on 8 August 1949; while reaffirming Bhutanese sovereignty, the new treaty gave India control over Bhutan's foreign policy. In 1963, however, Bhutan promulgated a new constitution which replaced the title of His Highness the Maharaja with His Majesty the Druk Gyalpo, formally promoting the country to the status of an independent, sovereign monarchy. In 1971, Bhutan joined the United Nations as a full member, and renegotiated the 1949 treaty with India in 2007, legally ending Bhutan's status as a protected state of India.

Hereditary salute No. of guns	Personal or local salute No. of guns	Title of Ruler	Name of state	Clan of Ruler	Present Location
15 (Note: Until 1975, when the monarchy was abolished.)	–	The Maharaja (Chogyal) of	(Kingdom of Sikkim) Sikkim	Tipihar	Sikkim

Though officially considered a princely state under its ruler, the Maharaja Chogyal, Sikkim was given the separate status of a British protectorate in 1861 under the Treaty of Tumlong, by which the British government could intervene in the state's internal affairs and oversee all external matters; despite this, Sikkim maintained a high degree of autonomy in practice. In 1947, the Maharaja Chogyal and his people decided against accession to India and chose to maintain Sikkim's internal sovereignty. The state formally became a protectorate of India in 1950. Following the death of the Maharaja Chogyal in 1963 and his succession by his unpopular son, Palden Thondup Namgyal, popular demands for increased individual rights grew more frequent. After Sikkim's first free general elections in 1974, the Indian Army placed the Chogyal under house arrest. Under military supervision, a controversial referendum was held in 1975, which approved the state's merger with India and the abolition of the monarchy. Sikkim was formally merged into India as its 22nd state on 26 April 1975.

=== Middle East and Persian Gulf ===
The following were constituent states of the Aden Protectorate from the late 19th century until their independence and merger with South Yemen in 1967 when the states were abolished. The protectorate was under the British Raj and governed as part of the Bombay Presidency until 1917 when the protectorate was transferred to the control of the British Foreign Office.

Hereditary salute No. of guns	Personal or local salute No. of guns	Title of Ruler	Name of state	Clan of Ruler	Present Location
9	11 (local)	The Sultan of (Note: Joined the Federation of South Arabia in 1962. Maintained its status until 1967, when the protectorate and state were abolished and merged with South Yemen.)	(Sultanate of Lahej) Lahej	Al-Abdali	Yemen
9	11 (local)	The Sultan of (Note: Joined the Protectorate of South Arabia in 1963. Maintained its status until 1967, when the protectorate and state were abolished and merged with South Yemen.)	Shihir and Makalla	Al-Qu'aiti	Yemen
9	-	The Sultan of	Qishn and Soqotra	Al-Mahri	Yemen
9	-	The Sultan of	(Fadhli Sultanate) Fadhli	Al-Fadhli	Yemen
-	9 (local)	The Emir of	(Emirate of Dhala) Dhala	Al-Amiri	Yemen
-	9 (local)	The Sultan of	Lower Yafa	Al-Afifi	Yemen

The Persian Gulf Residency was established in 1822 during the time of the East India Company, though the company had established a residency at Bushehr in 1763. It was made subordinate to the Governor of Bombay until 1873. As with the rest of British India, it came under the control of the British Crown in 1858. In 1873, the residency came under the direct control of the British Raj and the India Office. In 1892, it officially assumed a protectorate status over the states of Muscat and Oman, Bahrain and the Trucial States, followed by Kuwait in 1914 and Qatar in 1916. In 1920, the Treaty of Seeb recognised the de jure independence of Oman. The residency was transferred to the charge of the British Foreign Office from the India Office in 1947, shortly before Indian independence. In 1961, Kuwait became the first of the Gulf States to terminate its protectorate and become fully independent, with Muscat and Oman being recognised by Britain as an independent, protected state the following year. With the increasing costs of maintaining an overseas presence, Britain announced in January 1968 that it would end its protectorate over the remaining Gulf states in 1971. The protectorates were finally terminated in December 1971; Muscat and Oman became the modern sultanate of Oman that year, and the erstwhile Trucial States became the United Arab Emirates in 1972.

Hereditary salute No. of guns	Personal or local salute No. of guns	Title of Ruler	Name of state	Clan of Ruler	Present Location
21 (Note: Considered a de jure foreign monarch.)	-	The Sultan of (Note: With the style of Highness until 1971, when the country attained full independence from Britain and the style of the monarch was raised to Majesty.)	(Muscat and Oman) Mascat and Oman	Al-Said	Oman
-	7 (local, 11 personal) (Note: 5 guns (local, 11 personal) from 1914, raised to 7 guns (local) in 1923.)	The Sheikh (Ruler) of (Note: Granted the style of Excellency by the British government in 1914, raised to Highness from 1933. Assumed the title of Emir in 1961 upon attaining full independence from Britain.)	Kuwait	Al-Sabah	Kuwait
-	7 (local, 11 personal) (Note: 5 guns (local) and 11 guns (personal) from 1914, raised to 7 guns (local) in 1923.)	The Sheikh (Ruler) of (Note: Granted the personal style of Excellency by the British government from 1914; raised to Highness from 1933. Assumed the title of Emir in 1971 upon full independence from Britain; maintained style until 2002, when the nation was declared a kingdom and the style of the monarch was raised to Majesty with the title of King of Bahrain.)	Bahrain	Al-Khalifa	Bahrain
-	7 (local) (Note: Awarded in 1923.)	The Sheikh (Ruler) of (Note: With the style of Excellency until 1971, when the country attained full independence from Britain and the style of the monarch was raised to His Highness the Emir from the same time.)	Qatar	Al-Thani	Qatar
-	3 (local, 5 personal)	The Sheikh (Ruler) of (Note: With the style of Excellency until 1971, when the country attained full independence from Britain and the style of the monarch was raised to His Highness the Emir from the same time.)	(Emirate of Abu Dhabi) Abu Dhabi	Al-Nahyan	UAE
-	3 (local, 5 personal)	The Sheikh (Ruler) of (Note: Until 1971, when the country attained full independence from Britain and the style of the monarch was raised to His Highness the Emir from the same time.)	(Emirate of Sharjah) Sharjah	Al-Qasimi	UAE
-	5 (local) (Note: Awarded in 1929.)	The Sheikh (Ruler) of	(Emirate of Dubai) Dubai	Al-Maktoum	UAE
-	3 (local)	The Sheikh (Ruler) of	(Emirate of Ajman) Ajman	Al-Nuaimi	UAE
-	3 (local)	The Sheikh (Ruler) of	(Emirate of Ras Al Khaimah) Ras al-Khaimah	Al-Qasimi	UAE
-	3 (local)	The Sheikh (Ruler) of	(Emirate of Sharjah) Kalba (Note: Ruled by a branch of the Sharjah royal family as a Trucial State from 1936 until 1952, when it was reincorporated into Sharjah.)	Al-Qasimi	UAE
-	3 (local)	The Sheikh (Ruler) of	(Emirate of Umm Al Quwain) Umm al-Qaiwain	Al-Mu'alla	UAE

== Personal salute dynasties on the Indian subcontinent ==
=== Rulers of princely states (in 1947) ===
- 9 guns: Padam Singh, Raja of Bashahr (now in Himachal Pradesh)

=== Religious leaders ===
- 11 guns: the Aga Khan (religious leader of the Nizari Ismaili branch of Islam); only salute not attached to any territorial principality).

=== Political pensioners under the British Raj ===
- 19 guns (only personal and local) for the Nawab of Murshidabad, as heirs of Bengal (including present Bangladesh and West Bengal)
- 15 guns (until 1899) for the Nawab (later restyled Prince) of Arcot, i.e. the Carnatic
- 13 guns salute for Raja of Vizianagram

=== Zamindars in French India ===
- 4 guns: Manyam Zamindar of Yanam

== States within the British sphere of influence (as of 1947) ==
=== Sovereign foreign rulers ===
- 19 guns: The Dalai lama of Tibet, a de facto sovereign theocratic Buddhist nation before annexation by the People's Republic of China
- 21 guns: The King of Mosquito Coast (a Native South American kingdom in present Nicaragua; styled His Majesty, most unusual as HM is normally reserved for the Paramount Ruler and his or her independent peers; under British protectorate since 1688, formalised in 1749 with appointment of a resident Superintendent; Britain relinquished control in 1783–87; Nicaraguan sovereignty was recognised in 1860 under the Treaty of Managua, hence the king was effectively demoted to the rank of a mere "chief", in 1894 militarily driven into exile to Jamaica)
- 9 guns: The Kabaka of Buganda (a Ganda kingdom in Western Uganda, status granted after 1912, subsequently made permanent in 1939)

== See also ==
- List of Indian monarchs
- List of Maratha dynasties and states
- List of princely states of British India (alphabetical)
- List of Rajput dynasties and states
- Maratha Empire
- Maratha titles
- Prince and Principality for information on princely styles worldwide
- Princely state
- Rajputana
