= Ganpati Temple, Tasgaon =

The Lord Ganapati Temple, Tasgaon
- Chintamani
- Location in Mahashtra

Religion
- Affiliation: Hinduism
- District: Sangli

Location
- Location: Tasgaon
- State: Maharashtra
- Country: India
- Interactive map of The Lord Ganapati Temple, Tasgaon
- Coordinates: 17°02′00″N 74°40′00″E

The Lord Ganapati Temple is situated in the city of Tasgaon in Sangli district in the Indian state of Maharashtra. Most of the Ganapati idols have a left-sided trunk, while this temple's idols' trunk bends towards the right. The Ganapati idol with the trunk curved towards the right is said to be 'active (jagrut)’. This Ganapati is regarded as a living idol, ready to bless communities with good luck, wisdom, prosperity and happiness. The idol is embellished with solid gold, weighing 125 kilograms (276 lb).

== History ==
Parasuram Bhau Patwardhan (Raje of Tasgaon Sansthan) was Sar-Senapati of Nanasaheb Peshwa, who had established this Tasgaon Sansthan. Raje Parashuram had fought more than 100 wars against the Tipu Sultan in South India. At that time Tipu Sultan was impressed by the temples of southern India and its culture of worship.

== Design ==
The construction of a temple at Ganapati was begun in 1779 by Parasuram Bhau Patwardhan and finished in 1799 by his son Appa Patwardhan. These construction was made by Hindu- Wadar caste peoples from Karnataka. Its architecture resembles South Indian temple construction. It consists of an image−chamber and a hall (Mandapa) of plain but finely worked stone. The image−chamber is 9.44m x 8.83m and the hall 13.71m x 10.36m. The image−chamber has a spire 10.36m, flanked by our smaller ones 2.43 meters shorter making a grand composition. Mandapa has a flat roof of carved Stone slabs. The hall consists of a nave with three aisles made by two rows of pillars with a 3.04m space between them. At the hall's entrance are two shrines of the bull Nandi and the Garuda Guard 6.40m high including the pinnacles (shikhara). The entrance gateway formed by a masonry arch surmounted by a tower of the form known as the Gopura The Gopur is a large and lofty pinnacle. Gopura at Gadag in Karnataka State, India is comparable. It is seven-storied, gradually tapering to a ridge at the top. The lowest storey measures 11.27m, the whole is 29.08 m high, and the kalas (pinnacles) and curved arms are 0.17 m higher. Gopura is carved into images of gods and goddesses.

== Festival ==
The Grand celebration occurs in the city on next day of Bhadrapat Chaturthi when thousands of people gather to celebrate this auspicious occasion. This festival is cultural and religious event helping the people to unit together. This Ganpati stays for one and half-day. The Procession starts in afternoon for immersion of Ganpati. The 30 feet 'Ratha' (chariot) used to decorate specially for this occasion. Ratha is pulled by the Ganpati devotees up to stream where they do immersion of Ganpati. This tradition has continued since 1785. And the first reference to given for these ratha was that caste should be announced to Apparaje Patvardhan, because they was constructed the temple of Sansthan's Ganpati. First the Ratha was made of teak wood which was too heavy. Due to its accident in one year, new iron Ratha came into picture.
