= Bandhore Sharif =

Bandhore Sharif is a village in Kotli Azad kashmir Near an historical place Tatta Pani, Pakistan. There is a mosque there and a darbar called darbar e Aaliyah Bandhore Sharif (Hazrat Peer Sayed Akram Hussain Shah) where many people go to pray.
