= Anchal (disambiguation) =

Anchal may refer to:

- Anchal (name), which may be either a surname or a given name
- Anchal, town in India
- Anchal Post, an earlier postal system of Travancore, present day Kerala, India

== See also ==
- Aanchal (disambiguation)
- Acala (disambiguation)
- Himachal Pradesh, a state in northern India
