= Ahivant Fort =

Fort in Maharashtra, India

- Part of Ajintha Satmal Hill Range
- Nashik district, Maharashtra

Site information
- Type: Hill fort
- Owner: IndiaGovernment of India
- Controlled by: Ahmadnagar (1521-1594); Maratha Empire (1670-1676); Mughal Empire(1676-1754); Maratha Empire (1754-1818); United Kingdom: East India Company (1818-1857); British Raj (1857-1947); India (1947-)
- Open to the public: Yes
- Condition: Ruins

Location
- Shown within Maharashtra
- Location within Maharashtra
- Coordinates: 20°24′55.6″N 73°51′36″E
- Height: 4,024 ft (1,227 m)

Site history
- Materials: Stone

Ahivant Fort is a fort located 55km from Nashik, in Nashik district, of Maharashtra. This fort is an important fort in Nashik district. The three forts Achala, Ahivant, and Mohandar are very close by. The other two forts were constructed to guard the Ahivant fort.

== History ==
In 1636 this fort was under the control of Adilshah. The Moghul Emperor Shahjahan sent one of his generals, Shaista Khan, and instructed him to win all the forts in Nashik region. Alivardi Khan was a cavalier of Shaista Khan who won the fort. In 1670, the Maratha King Shivaji won the fort from the Moghuls. The Mughal Emperor, Aurangzeb, sent his chieftain Mahabat Khan to win the fort. Mahabat Khan and Diler Khan opened a battle front from either side of the fort. The attack was so fierce that the fort was surrendered to Moghuls. In 1818, the fort was captured by British Colonel Prother.

== How to reach ==
The nearest town is Vani which is 44 km from Nashik. The base village of the fort is Daregaonwani which is 13km from Vani. There are good hotels at Vani. The trekking path starts from the hillock north of the Daregoanwani. The route is very safe and wide. There are no trees on the trekking route. It takes about two hours to reach the entrance gate of the fort. The night stay on the fort cannot be made due to lack of potable water on the fort. The villagers from the local village make night stay and food arrangements at a reasonable cost. The other route is from Village ahiwantwadi. This route is the shortest and safe. The motorable road from Daregaon towards Bilawadi helps to reach the col easily and from there a small climb for 1hr can reach the top of the fort.

== Places to see ==
The Ahivant fort is occupied on a large flat plateau. All the structures are in ruined state. The ruins of store houses and arches can be seen on the fort. There are some bastions and water cisterns on the fort to be seen. There is a large pond in the middle of the fort. It takes about one hour to encircle the fort.

== See also ==
- List of forts in Maharashtra
- List of forts in India
- Shaista Khan
- Marathi People
- Maratha titles
