= Aanchal =

Aanchal may refer to:

== Personal name ==
- Aanchal Khurana, Indian actress
- Aanchal Munjal, Indian actress
- Anchal Sabharwal (also known simply as Aanchal), Indian actress
- Aanchal Thakur, Indian skier

== Film and television ==
- Aanchal (1960 film), a 1960 Indian film
- Aanchal (1962 film), a 1962 Indian film
- Aanchal (1980 film), a 1980 Indian film by Anil Ganguly
- Aanchal (1997 film), a 1997 Indian film
- "Aanchal", an episode from season 3 of the Indian television drama Rishtey
- Maa Ka Aanchal, a 1970 Indian film

== See also ==
- Anchal (disambiguation)
- Acala (disambiguation)
- Himachal Pradesh, a state in northern India
