= Raje =

Raje (IAST: Rājē, राजे) is a historical royal title from the Indian subcontinent, an honorary title for a Maratha rulers or nobleman, similar to "Your Majesty" or "Raja". It was used to denote royal status and greatness, and Maratha clans prefixed it to their surnames, While "Raje" is an appropriate term, the title "Maharaj" was also widely used, notably by Chhatrapati Shivaji Maharaj, to assert sovereignty and align with popular sentiments, though he was also born Shivaji Raje Bhonsle.

== Etymology and variations ==
"Raje" comes from the Sanskrit word "Rāja" (rājā), which means "king". The rulers were addressed by the people as Rāje.

Rāje refers to a title or description for Maratha community who identify as Kshatriyas (warriors) and are referred to by the title "Rājē" (Your Majesty) or as belonging to the "Kshatriya Kulavantas" (Head of the Kshatriya race) lineage, This term encapsulates the historical warrior tradition and noble status claimed by Maratha families, to assert their place within the Kshatriya varna.

== See also ==
- Maratha
- Kshatriya
- Maratha Empire
- Rao (Maratha title)
- Deshmukh
- Maratha titles
- Sardar
- Mankari
- Deshmukh
- Zamindar
