= Anchal (name) =

Anchal may be either a surname or given name

- Rajiv Anchal (b. India), film producer and director
- Anchal Joseph (b. 1987 India), Indian-American model
- Anchal Sabharwal (b. 29 August 1986), a film actress and model
- Anchal Achan (b. 1770–80), a saint of Anchal
- Anchal Sonkar (b. 1960), an Indian politician
