= Achal Kumar Srivastava =

Indian neurologist

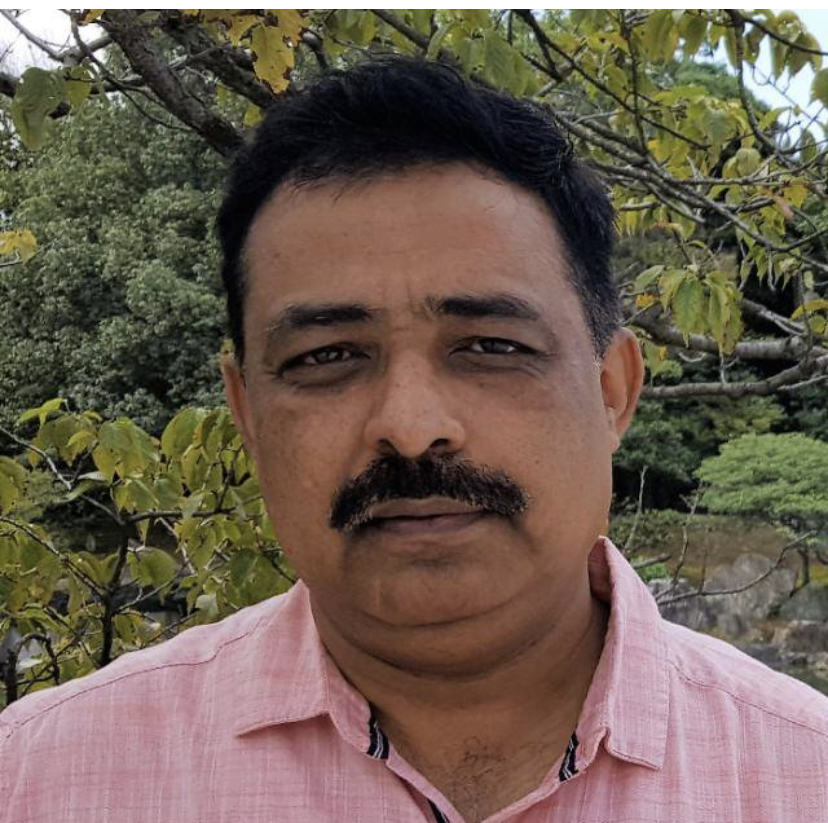
- Education: Motilal Nehru Medical College; All India Institute of Medical Sciences, New Delhi
- Occupation: Professor of neurology
- Years active: 2000 – present
- Known for: Research on movement disorders

Achal Kumar Srivastava is an Indian neurologist and medical researcher. He is Professor of Clinical Neurophysiology in the Department of Neurology at All India Institute of Medical Sciences (AIIMS) in New Delhi, heads its clinical neurophysiology and ataxia facilities, and is a member of its epilepsy care team.

== Education ==
Srivastava earned his medical degree in 1991 and his MD in 1994 from Motilal Nehru Medical College in Allahabad, and specialist postgraduate certification (DM) in neurology from AIIMS in 1998.

== Career ==
After working for over a year as a scientist fellow at the CSIR Institute of Genomics and Integrative Biology in Delhi, in 2001 he became an assistant professor in the Department of Neurology at AIIMS. As of January 2020 he is Professor of Clinical Neurophysiology and head of the clinical neurophysiology facility and ataxia center and a member of the epilepsy care team. He established the department's Movement Disorder Clinic.

Srivastava's research focuses on the genetics, prognosis, and diagnosis of movement disorders including hereditary ataxias. He received a young investigator award for presentations on CAG triplet repeat disorder, the best paper award at the 1998 conference of the Neurological Society of India, and the outstanding paper presentation award at the 2004 conference of the American Academy of Neurology, and has been invited to present his work on spinocerebellar ataxia type 12 at Johns Hopkins University.
