= Maratha titles =

Titles used by Maratha community of India

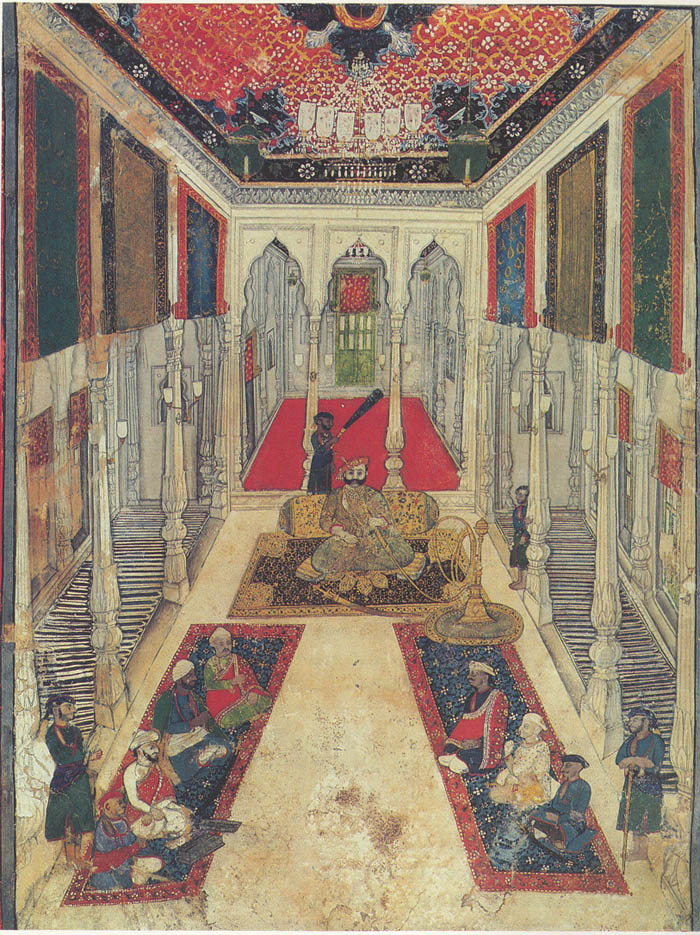
A Maratha Durbar showing the Chief (Raja) and the nobles (Sardars, Jagirdars, Istamuradars & Mankaris) of the state.

The following list includes a brief about the titles of nobility or orders of chivalry used by the Marathas of India and by the Marathis/Konkanis in general.

== Titles used by the Maratha Royals ==
The titles used by royalty, aristocracy and nobility of the Maratha Empire

- Chhatrapati: Chhatrapati is an Indian royal title most equivalent to a King or an Emperor. It means the 'Lord of the Parasol' and is a title conferred upon the founder of Maratha Empire,Chhatrapati Shivaji. The title is also used by Shivaji's descendants.
- Maharaj: The English equivalent of Maharaj is great king. It is a title first conferred upon Shivaji's father Shahaji Raje Bhosale.
- Maharani: The English equivalent of Maharani is great queen. It is a title first used by Tarabai, as regent of the Marathas empire .
- Raje: The English equivalent of Raje is Your Majesty. It is a title first conferred upon Shivaji's grandfather Maloji Raje Bhosale
- Kshatriya Kulavantas: It means 'The Head of the Kshatriya varna' and was a title first given to Shivaji at the time of his coronation
- Sinhasanadhishwar: It means 'the enthroned King' and was a title first given to Shivaji at the time of his coronation
- Peshwa: It is a word of Persian origin and means 'Foremost' or 'the first minister' or 'Premier' (or Prime Minister). It was a title given to the prime ministers of the Maratha Empire
- Peshwin: The wife of a Peshwa
- Prataprao: An honor given by Chhattrapati or Peshwa to extraordinary warriors who were brave in the battlefield. Famous people who got the title were Prataprao gujar, Mallasarja Desai etc.
- Daria Sarang: It means the Chief or Admiral of the Maratha Navy
- Senakhaskhel: It means the Commander of the armies of the state (Maratha Army). It is a designation created by Rajaram I.
- Shamsher Bahadur: It is a title conferred upon the Maharajas of Baroda (the Gaekwads) and means a distinguished swordsman
- Maharajadhiraj Raj Rajeshwar Alija Bahadur: It is a title used by the Maharajas of Indore (the Holkars). For example, Maharajadhiraj Raj Rajeshwar Alija Bahadur H.H. Yashwant Rao Holkar
- Raj Rajeshwar: It means 'king of kings' and is a title conferred upon the Holkar (Maratha) Maharajas.
- Rajadhiraj: It means 'King of Kings'.
- Maharajadhiraj: It means 'Great King of Kings'. For example, it was conferred upon H. H. Maharajadhiraj Rajeshwar Sawai Tukoji Rao Holkar Bahadur K.G.C.S.I.
- Naib Wakil-i-Mutlaq: It means Deputy Regent of Mughal affairs. It was a title conferred upon Shrimant Maharaja Mahadaji Shinde (Scindia) by the Mughals.
- I'timad-al-Daula: It means Trusted of the State.
- Amir-al-Umara: It means the Head of the Amirs and was a title conferred upon Shrimant Maharaja Mahadaji Shinde (Scindia) by the Mughals, since he helped the Mughal Emperor, Shah Alam II, ascend the throne of Delhi.
- Shrimant: It is a title used by Maratha royals and nobles. It was also used in recent times to formally address well achieved members of society or upperclass men in Marathi. For example, 'Shrimant' Bajirao Peshwa aka Baji Rao I or 'Shrimant' Dnyaneshwar Agashe.
- Sardar: It is a title used by the most senior Mahratta nobles, for example Shrimant 'Sardar' Ranoji Rao Scindia Bahadur, Subedar of Malwa
- Mankari: Mānkari (Maankari) is a hereditary title used by Maratha nobles who held land grants, and cash allowances. They were entitled to certain ceremonial honours and held an official position at the Darbar (court).
- Sawai: 'Sawai' in Marathi means 'a notch above the rest'. For example, it was a title conferred upon His Highness Shrimant Sawai Madhavrao Peshwa aka Madhu Rao II Narayan
- Pant Pratinidhi: It means a vicegerent; title borne by a distinguished Maratha family.
- Nawab: It is a title used by the Nawabs of Banda (a vassal of Maratha polity), such as the Nawab of Banda, Ali Bahadur, the grandson of Shreemant Bajirao I
- Desai: It was a title given to feudal lords, and others who were granted a village or group of villages in Maharashtra, and North Karnataka. The title Desai should not be associated with a particular religion or caste, though a Desai would use the title of Rao or Rai or Raje as a suffix to his name denoting he is a king of those villages, The "Desai" title was given by Maratha emperors, Mughal emperors and by the Deccan sultanates. In Maharashtra, the title Desai is conferred to feudal lords and village council members. Most of them were either Gaud Saraswat Brahmins, Deshastha Brahmins, Karhade Brahmins, Lingayat Vani and Maratha (caste).

Desais were the rulers of Kudal (Sindhudurg) in Maharashtra. Desai, or a loftier compound, was a rare title for rulers of a few princely states, notably - Raja Sar Desai in the Maratha Savantvadi State from 1627 until the adoption of "Raja Bahadur" in 1763.

Senasaheb Subah, SenaDhurandar : Title given to Nagpurkar Bhosales for the valor in various battles.

== Titles given by the British to Maratha Royals during the British Raj ==
- Knight Grand Commander of the Order of the Star of India (GCSI): It is a title created by the British Empire in India and was conferred upon Indian nobles. For example, it was bestowed upon His Highness Khanderao Gaekwad of Baroda and Asaf Jah VI His Highness Mir Mahbub Ali Khan
- His Highness: It is a title created by the British Empire in India and was conferred upon Indian nobles. For example, it was bestowed upon His Highness Sayajirao Gaekwad III of Baroda
- Knight Grand Commander (GCIE): It is a title created by the British and is a part of The Most Eminent Order of the Indian Empire, an order of chivalry founded by Queen Victoria in 1878. For example, it was bestowed upon His Highness Colonel Sir Shahu Chhatrapati Maharaj G.C.I.E, G.C.S.I, G.C.V.O Maharaja of Kolhapur
- Knight/Dame Grand Cross (GCVO): It is a title created by the British and is a part of The Royal Victorian Order. For example, it was bestowed upon His Highness Colonel Sir Shahu Chhatrapati Maharaj G.C.I.E, G.C.S.I, G.C.V.O Maharaja of Kolhapur
- Kaiser-i-Hind (KIH): It was first instituted by Queen Victoria on 10 April 1900 and is literally translated to mean 'Emperor of India'. For example, it was conferred upon His Highness Sayajirao Gaekwad III, the Maratha Maharaja of Baroda
- Knight Grand Cross (GCB): It is the most honourable Order of the Bath and is a British order of chivalry founded by George I on 18 May 1725. For example, it was conferred upon General His Highness Maharajadhiraj Maharaja Shrimant Sir Jayajirao Scindia Bahadur, Maharaja Scindia of Gwalior, GCB, GCSI, CIE, KIH
- Farzand-i-Khas-i-Daulat-i-Inglishia: It means the 'Favoured son of the English nation'. For example, it was conferred upon the Maratha Maharajas of Baroda

== Other titles ==
- Rao: The word "Rao" comes from the Sanskrit word "rājā," meaning "king" or "Prince". In Marathi, it be a form of the word "Raja" (king), a associated with the Kshatriya varna, or warrior class.
- Raut: is a title, ance within the Maratha community, historically referring to a warrior or horseman in Deccan. It is derived from the Sanskrit word "rajaputra," meaning "son of a king," and is associated with the ruling class. Today, "Raut/rautta" remains a common surname and title among Marathas, and is associated with traditional landholding and military communities.
- Appa: It is a title used to indicate administrator of a city which means 'head' or 'Father'.
- Dēśamukh: is a historical title conferred to the rulers of a Dēśamukhi. It is used as a surname in certain regions of India, especially in the states of Maharashtra, Karnataka and Telangana and also in Andhra Pradesh and northern parts of Madhya Pradesh and Gujarat, Goa whose family received it as a title.
- Sinh: It is a word derived from the Sanskrit word siḿha, meaning 'lion'. It is used as a suffix to the first name, example Maharaja Pratapsinh Gaekwad

== See also ==
- Indian honorifics, Filipino, Indonesian, Malay and Thai titles originated from these
- Indian feudalism
- Maratha
- Kshatriya
- Maratha Empire
- List of Maratha dynasties and states
- Salute state
- Princely state
