= Mankari =

Hereditary title in the Indian subcontinent

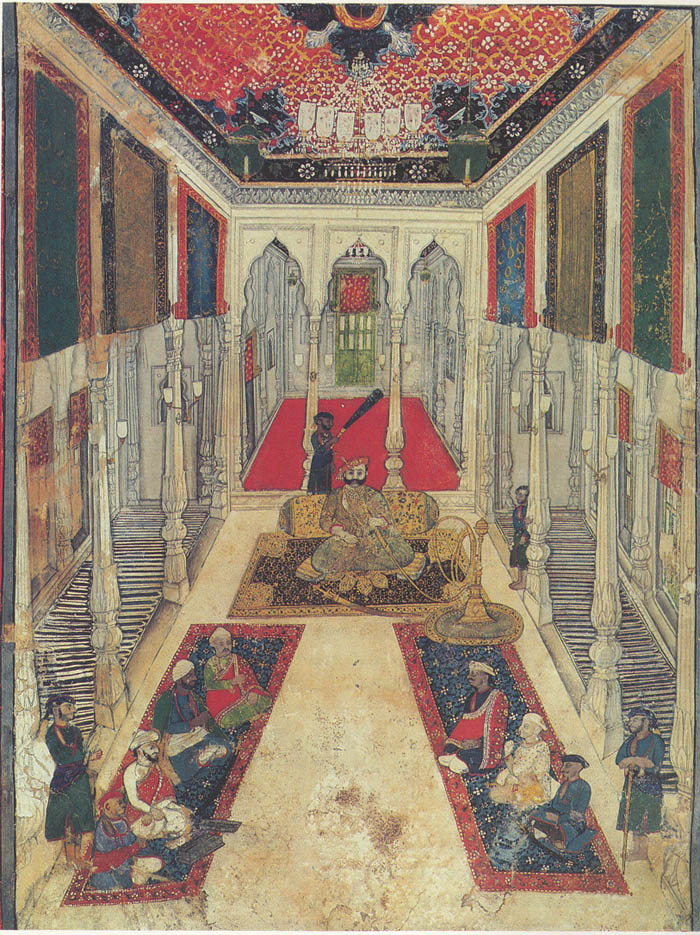
A Maratha Durbar showing the Chief (Raja) and the nobles (Sardars, Jagirdars, Istamuradars & Mankaris of the state

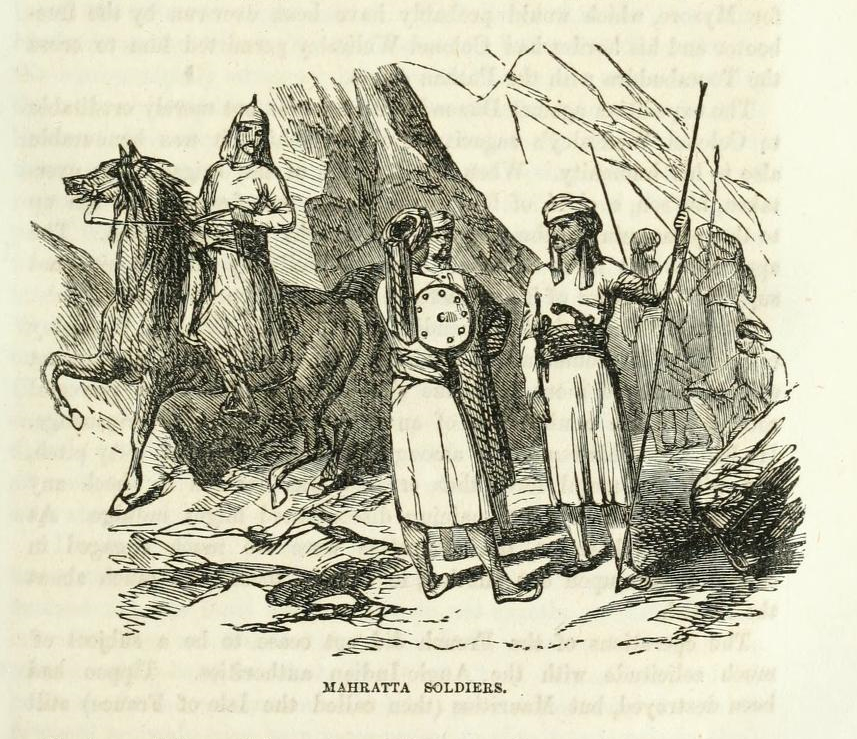
Maratha Soldiers

Mankari (Mānkari or Maankari) is a hereditary title used by Maratha nobles and military retainers from the Indian subcontinent who held land grants, and cash allowances. They held an official position at the Darbar (court) and were entitled to certain ceremonial honours and presents rendered at courts, councils, weddings, festivals, village assemblies, etc. They were worthy of distinction and the honour bestowed upon them was the result of the military, bureaucratic or fiscal importance of them or their distinguished ancestors.

The term was widely used by Maratha nobility, who held important positions in various princely states of the Maratha Empire.

== See also ==
- Maratha Empire – 1674–1818 empire in the Indian subcontinent
- Maratha titles – Titles used by Maratha community of India
- Indian honorifics – Courtesy form of address in the Indian subcontinent
- Indian feudalism – India's social structure till the 20th century
- Sardar – Persian title of nobility
- Jagirdar – Feudal land grant in South Asia started in 13th century
- Zamindar – Indian hereditary aristocrat
- Princely state – Indian vassal states under the British Raj
- Salute state – Princely state under the British Raj
- List of Indian Princely States
- List of Maratha dynasties and states
