= Durbar (court) =

Meeting of noblemen and princes in pre-20th-century India

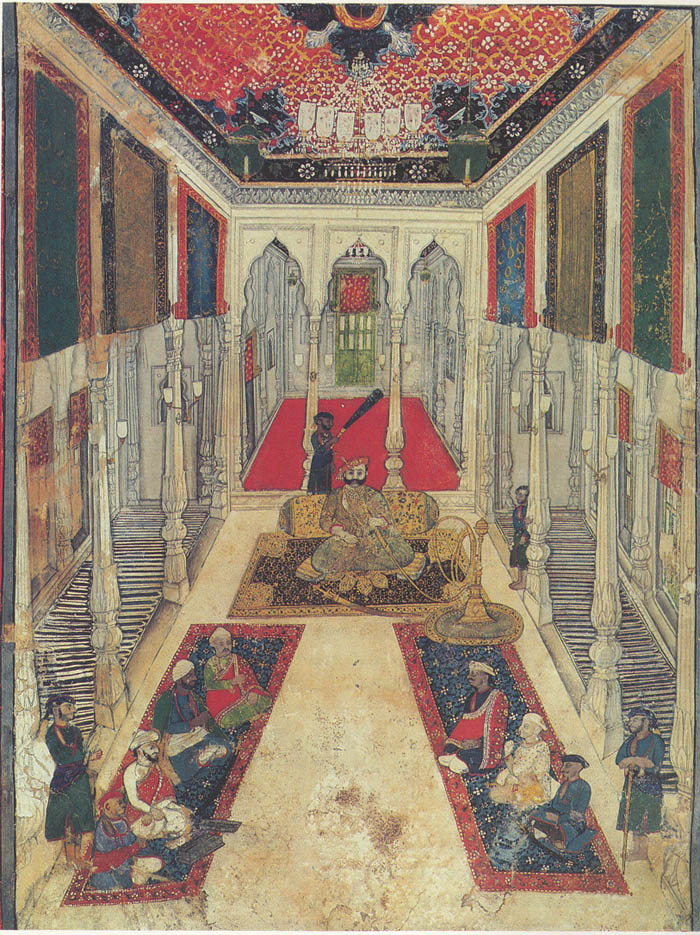
Maratha emperor Rajaram II and the princely state's nobles: sardars, jagirdars, istamuradars, and mankaris in the royal court, 1758.

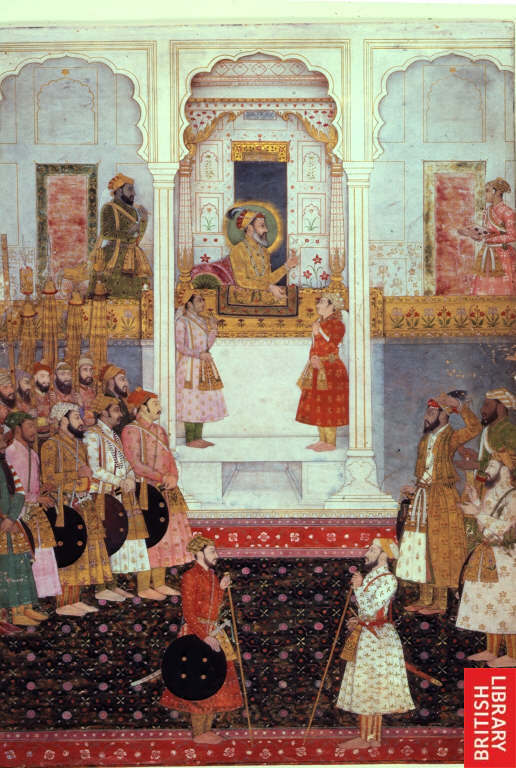
Mughal emperor Shah Jahan and prince Aurangzeb in the royal court, 1650

Durbar is a Persian-derived term (from Persian: دربار, romanized: darbār) referring to the noble court of a king or ruler or a formal meeting where the king held all discussions regarding the state. It was used in South Asia for a ruler's court or feudal levy. A durbar may be either a feudal state council for administering the affairs of a princely state, or a purely ceremonial gathering, as was increasingly the case during British Raj.

The most famous durbars belonged to powerful emperors and kings. In the north of India, cities like Baroda, Gwalior, Udaipur, Jaipur, Jodhpur, Jaisalmer, Delhi, Fatehpur Sikri, Agra, and Lahore in Pakistan. The Mughal emperor Akbar had two halls—one for his ministers, and the other for the general public. Usually, durbar halls are lavishly decorated with the best possible materials available at the time.

In the south of India, the Mysore Palace had a number of such halls, especially the Peacock Hall, having colour tinted glasses imported from Belgium, which were used for marriage ceremonies. The Durbar Hall in the Khilawat Mubarak, in the city of Hyderabad, Telangana, was the Durbar Hall of the Nizams of Hyderabad.

Beneath the main dome of the Rashtrapati Bhavan is the Grand Durbar Hall. As the building now serves as the presidential palace, many state functions are currently carried out there, presided upon by the President of India. The name of Durbar Hall was changed to Gantantra Mandap by Government of India w.e.f. 25.07.2014.

== State Council ==
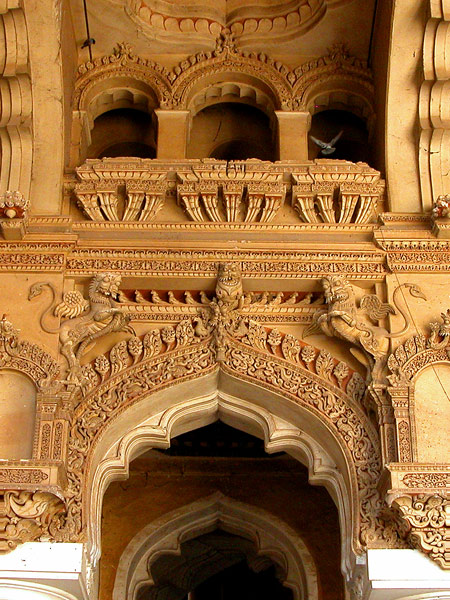
The Queen Mangammal's sitting place in the Durbar Hall at Thirumalai Nayakkar Mahal, Madurai, Tamil Nadu

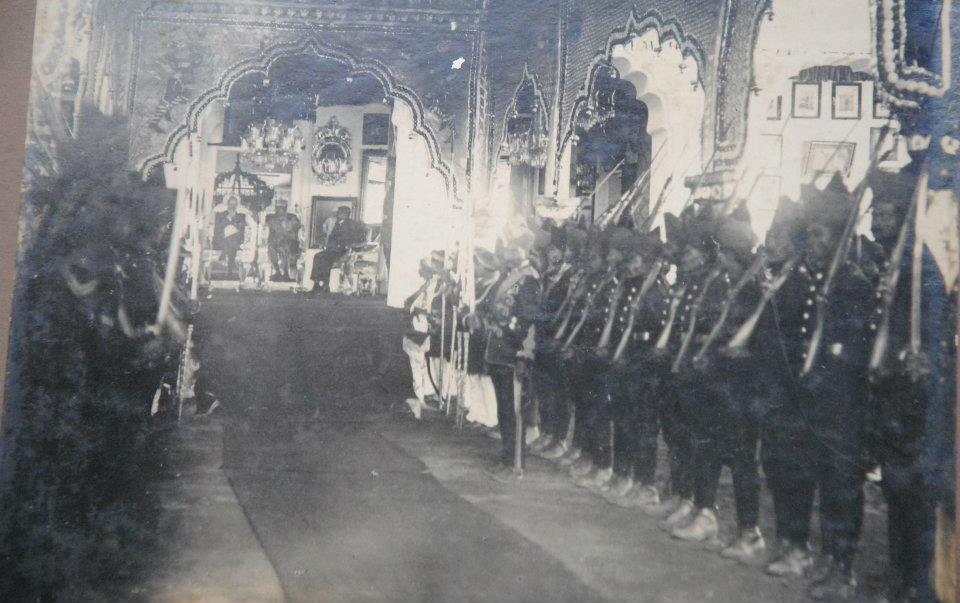
The Durbar Hall at Jaipur, Rajasthan

In the former sense, the native rulers of the Indian subcontinent such as the Marathas and Rajputs, other Hindu or Muslim monarchies, like the Mughals and emirs of Afghanistan, and even Western colonial rulers received visitors in audience, conferred honours, and conducted business in durbar.

A durbar could also be the executive council of a native state. Its membership was dual: the court's grandees, such as the vizier and major jagirdars (feudal landholders), shone at the ceremonies but the real political and administrative affairs of state rather rested with an inner circle around the prince, often known as divan. There was some overlap between the two groups. This was originally another word for audience room and council, but in India, it also applies to a privy council and chancery.

== British India ==
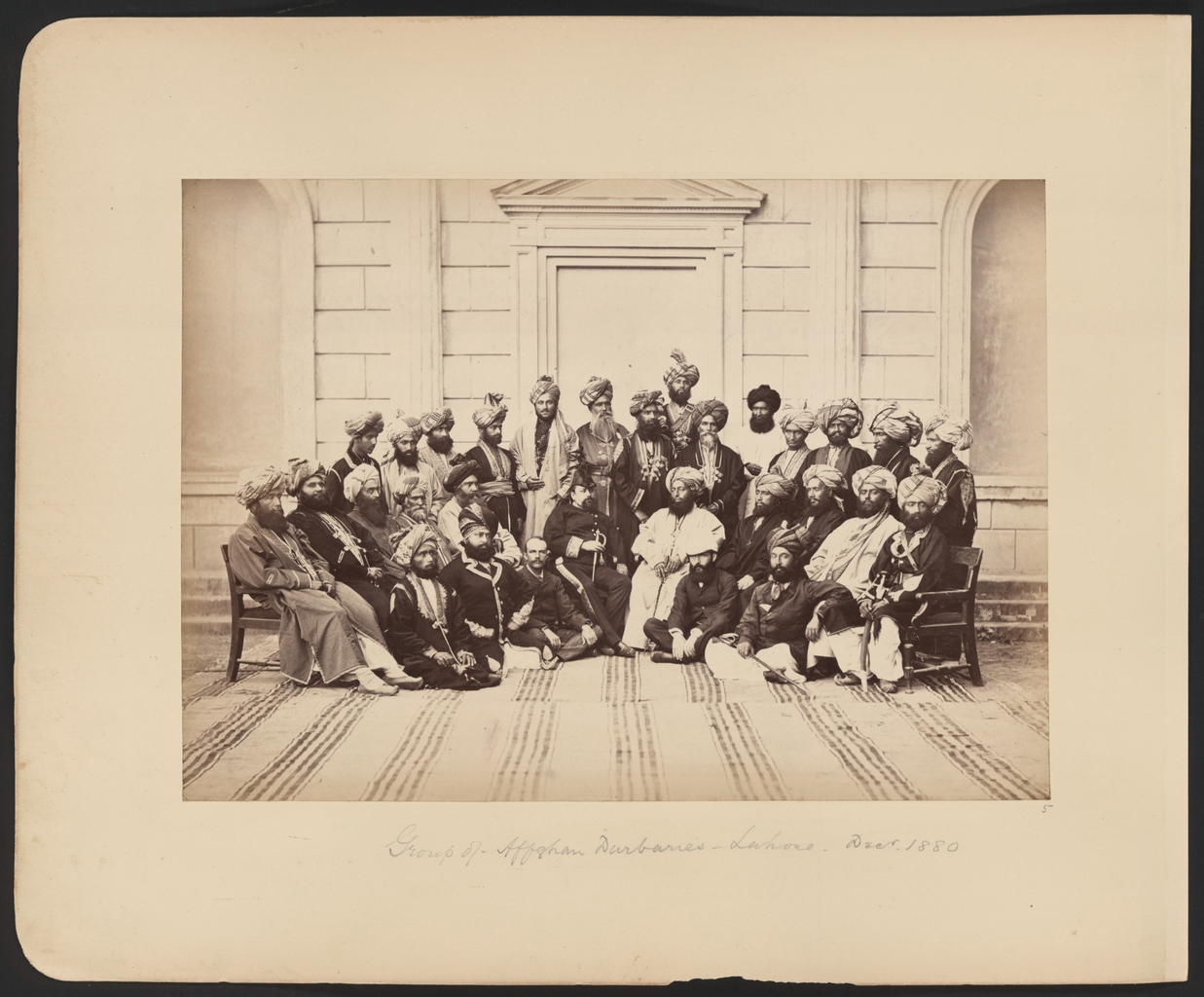
Group of Afghan Durbaries in Lahore, Punjab (December 1880)

The word durbar has come to be applied to great ceremonial gatherings called "the Delhi Durbar" in Delhi and elsewhere during the period of the British Raj, held as demonstrations of the loyalty to The Crown, which also proved vital in various wars in which the United Kingdom engaged.

The practice was started with Lord Lytton's Proclamation Durbar of 1877, celebrating the proclamation of Queen Victoria as the first Empress of India. Durbars continued to be held in later years, with increased ceremony and grandeur than their predecessors. In 1903, for instance, the Coronation Durbar was held in Delhi to celebrate the accession of Edward VII to the British throne and title of Emperor of India. This ceremony was presided over by the Viceroy of India, Lord Curzon.

The practice of the durbar culminated in the magnificent spectacle that was the Delhi Durbar, which was held in December 1911 to officially crown the newly enthroned George V and his wife Queen Mary as Emperor and Empress of India. The King and Queen attended the Durbar in person and wore their Coronation robes, an unprecedented event in both Indian and Imperial history held with unprecedented pomp and glamour. They were the only British monarchs to visit India during the period of British rule.

No durbar was held for later British monarchs who were Emperors of India. Edward VIII reigned only a brief time before abdicating. On the accession of his brother George VI, it was decided to hold no durbar in Delhi, due to several reasons: the cost would have been a burden to the government of India, rising Indian nationalism made the welcome that the royal couple would have received likely to be muted at best, and a prolonged absence of the King from the United Kingdom would have been undesirable in the tense period before World War II.

=== Durbar Hall – Fateh Prakash Palace, Udaipur ===
The Durbar Hall at the Fateh Prakash Palace in Udaipur, Rajasthan, is one of the most lavish Durbar Halls in India and one of the grandest chambers in Udaipur. It is decorated with paintings of Maharanas and various weapons adorn the walls. The hall has an exquisite ceiling and is surrounded by viewing galleries from where the ladies of the palace could view the proceedings while remaining veiled. Lord Minto, the Viceroy of India, laid the foundation stone for the Durbar Hall in 1909.

=== Durbar Hall – Khilawat Mubarak, Hyderabad ===
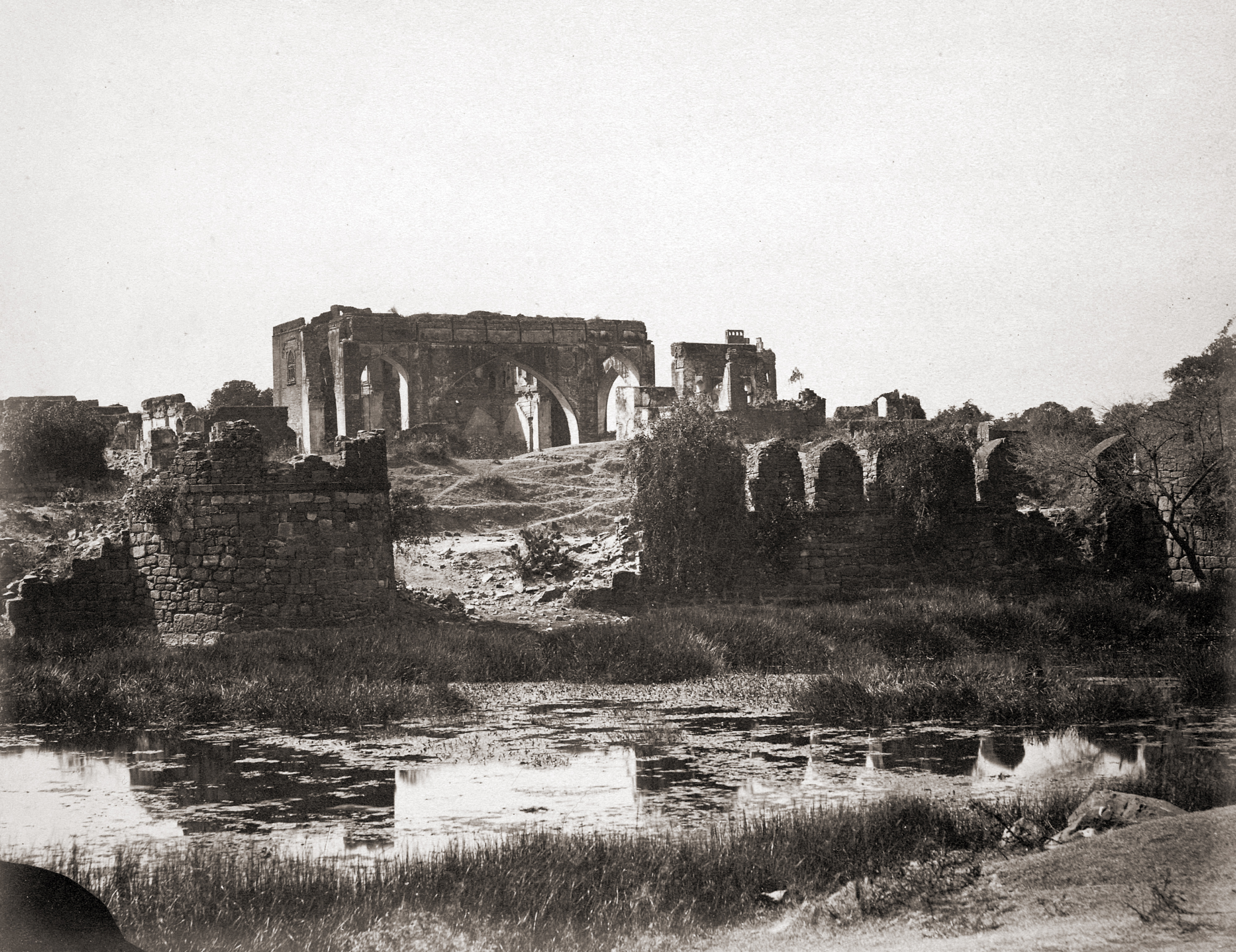
The Gagan Mahal in Bijapur, Karnataka

Located in the old city of Hyderabad in close proximity to the Charminar, the Khilawat complex, originally spread over 60 acres (240,000 m^{2}), had numerous palaces and structures in its vast sprawl. One of the most important buildings to have survived the passage of time is the Durbar Hall. The symbolic seat of power, it housed the "Gaddi-e-Mubarak", the hereditary throne of the Asaf Jahi dynasty.

First constructed in 1750 by the Nizam, Salabat Jung, the Khilwat complex has been added to by successive nizams. Sikandar Jah shifted his residence to the Khilawat complex from the Purani Haveli in 1803 and was responsible for the first major constructions.

The plan of the Durbar Hall is in traditional Moghul style. Subsequent remodelling, at a time when European architecture was gaining acceptance, resulted in a unique and harmonious mix of diverse architectural styles. European architectural influences, although dominant, blend smoothly with the vernacular, to create one of the best examples of Indo-European architectural synthesis. The resulting style was to become a distinctive feature of many later buildings in Hyderabad as it provided for a change without compromising the spatial needs of eastern lifestyle and social requirements.

=== Durbar Hall – Mysore Palace, Karnataka ===
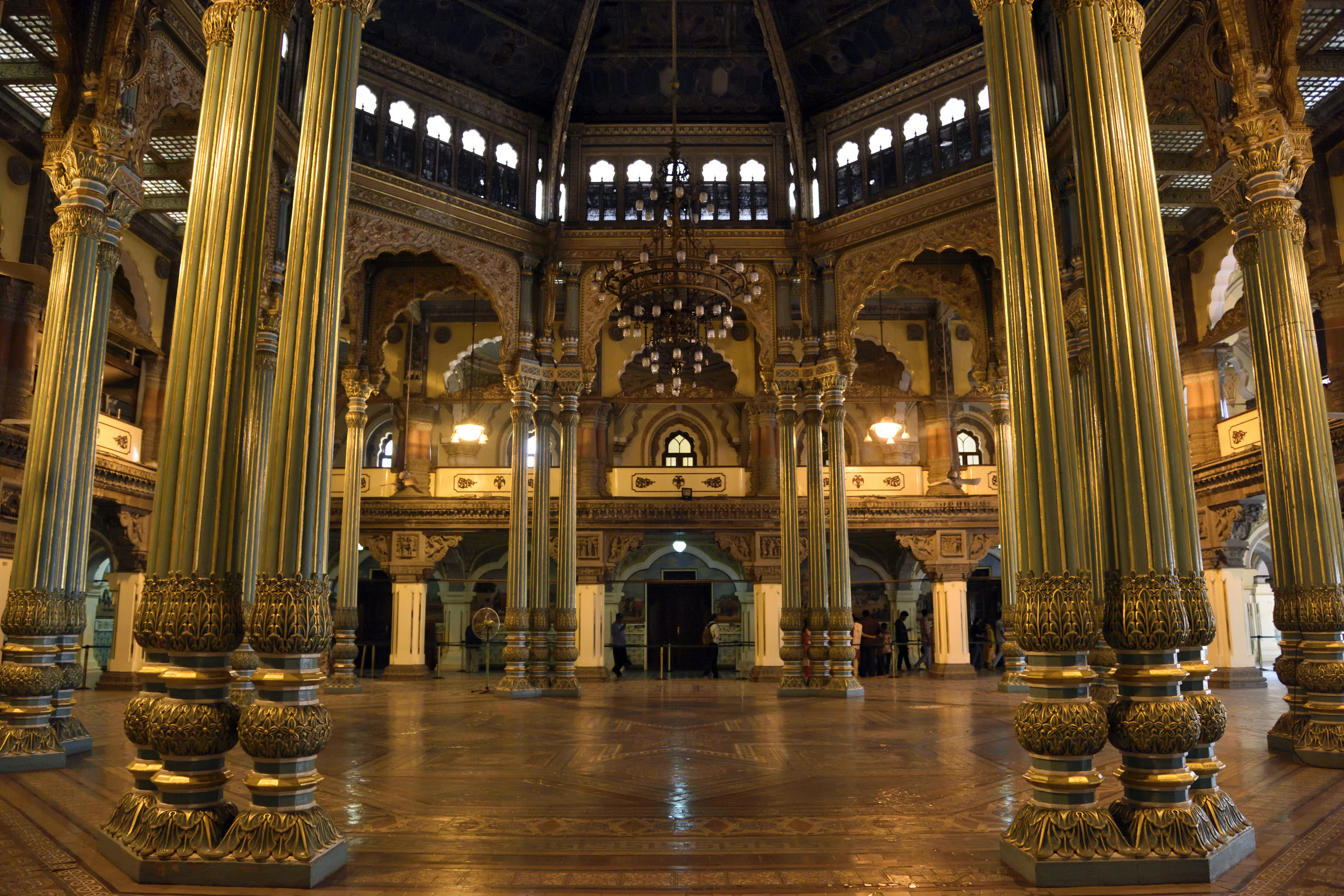
The Durbar Hall in the Amba Vilas Palace in Mysore, Karnataka

The Durbar Hall at the Amba Vilas Palace in Mysore, Karnataka, is the official residence of the Wadiyar dynasty and the seat of the Kingdom of Mysore. The last palace, now known as the Old Palace or the Wooden Palace, burned to ashes during the wedding of Jayalakshammani, the eldest daughter of Chamaraja Wodeyar in 1896. Maharaja Krishnaraja Wodeyar IV and his mother Maharani Kempananjammanni Devi commissioned the English architect Henry Irwin to build a new palace.

Designed by Irwin, the style is that of Indo-Saracenic architecture, with elements from Islamic, Rajput, and Gothic architecture styles. It is a three-story, gray granite, structure, about 75 m (245 ft) long and about 48 m (156 ft) wide. There are square towers, five stories tall, at each of the cardinal points, topped with pink domes. The tallest tower, 44 m (145 ft) tall, is at the centre of the palace and is topped with a gold plated dome.

== Malaysia ==
In Malaysian history, the durbar was the council comprising the four rulers of the Federated Malay States under British protectorate. First held in 1897, it was a platform for the rulers to discuss issues pertaining state policies with British officials.

When the Federation of Malaya was formed in 1948, the Durbar transformed into the Conference of Rulers, with the inclusion of the other states of Malaya. The membership was further enlarged with the addition of new states in the formation of Malaysia in 1963.

Since the Malayan Declaration of Independence in 1957, the Malay rulers in the Conference of Rulers function as the electoral college for the election of the federal king, the King of Malaysia.
