= List of heads of former ruling families =

These individuals may or may not claim titles associated with an abolished monarchy. Individuals who stake claims to monarchical titles but who are not part of former dynasties are not included. Note that a country may have multiple houses with a claim to the defunct position.

== Africa ==
State	Head	Since	House	Relationship	Succession	Abolition	Ref(s)
(Kingdom of Burundi) Burundi	Rosa Paula Iribagiza (Note: As the last living sister and daughter of the last and second-to-last kings respectively, Princess Rosa Paula Iribagiza is considered the head of the royal household. According to the relevant laws of succession, however, the crown must pass to a male member of the family.)	1 May 1977	Ntwero	Daughter of Mwami Mwambutsa IV (1915–1966).	Hereditary	1966	
Central African Empire	Jean-Bédel Bokassa Jr. (Bokassa II)	3 November 1996	Bokassa	Heir apparent and son of Emperor Bokassa I (1976–1979). (Note: Jean-Bédel Bokassa was Crown Prince of the Central African Empire from its inception on 4 December 1976 until its abolition on 20 September 1979.)	Hereditary	1979	
(Kingdom of Egypt) Egypt	Fuad II	18 June 1953 (Note: Fuad II previously reigned as King of Egypt and the Sudan during his infancy, from 26 July 1952 until the monarchy's official abolition in 1953. He reigned in absentia, and under a regent.)	Muhammad Ali	Last reigning King (1952–1953).	Hereditary	1953	
(Ethiopian Empire) Ethiopia	Zera Yacob Amha Selassie (Note: Designated heir presumptive by his grandfather the Emperor on 14 April 1974. Confirmed as heir apparent by his father Amha Selassie I on 6 April 1988. He has used the title of crown prince since 7 April 1989, when his father was proclaimed emperor-in-exile. He is recognised as heir to the throne by the Imperial Crown Council.)	7 February 1997	Solomon (Note: The Solomonic dynasty of Ethiopia claims descent from King Solomon of Israel, who belonged to the House of David. Both of the current claimants are from the House of Shoa, which represents the junior branch of the dynasty.)	Grandson of Emperor Haile Selassie I (1930–1974).	Hereditary (Note: According to the 1955 Constitution, the Emperor designated his successor from members of his own family, with the rule of primogeniture preferred but not necessarily followed. Candidates for the succession must be descendants of the Solomonic dynasty, in the male or female line. They must also be practising members of the Ethiopian Orthodox Church, and their candidature must be approved by the Imperial Crown Council. If the Emperor has no direct descendants, or if the crown prince is unable to perform his dynastic duties, the Crown Council selects the successor from amongst the members of the Solomonic dynasty.)	1975	
(Ethiopian Empire) Ethiopia	Girma Yohannes Iyasu (Note: Lij Girma claims that all governments in Ethiopia since the 1916 deposition of his grandfather are illegitimate, and as such, as the seniormost descendant of Iyasu V, he claims to be the nation's rightful monarch.)	1977	Solomon	Grandson of Emperor Iyasu V (1913–1916). (Note: Iyasu V was heir apparent of Menelik II and succeeded as Emperor upon the latter's death, but was never crowned. His reign was terminated with the sanction of the Church following allegations of conversion to Islam.)	Hereditary	1975	
(Kingdom of Libya) Libya	Muhammad bin Hasan	18 June 1992	Senussi	Grandnephew of King Idris I (1951–1969).	Hereditary	1969	
(Kingdom of Rwanda) Rwanda	Emmanuel Bushayija (Yuhi VI)	9 January 2017 (Note: Emmanuel Bushayija was chosen on 9 January 2017 to succeed his paternal uncle Kigeli V Ndahindurwa, who was deposed on 28 January 1961.)	Abanyiginya (Note: The royal Abanyiginya clan of Tutsis.)	Grandson of Mwami Yuhi V Musinga (1896–1931).	Hereditary and Elective (Note: The mwami is selected from amongst members of the various royal clans by the Abiru, a traditional council of Tutsi and Hutu elders.)	1961	
(Sultanate of Zanzibar) Zanzibar	Ali III bin Jamshid Al Said	30 December 2024	Al Bu Sa'id	Son of Sultan Jamshid bin Abdullah (1963–1964).	Hereditary	1964	

== Americas ==
State	Head	Since	House	Relationship	Succession	Abolition	Ref(s)
Brazil	Bertrand	15 July 2022	Orléans-Braganza (Note: The imperial family of Brazil is descended from the Houses of Braganza and Orléans. The current line of succession is disputed between two branches: the Vassouras branch, headed by Prince Bertrand, and the Petrópolis branch, headed by Prince Pedro Carlos.)	Great-great-grandson of Emperor Pedro II (1831–1889).	Hereditary	1889	
Brazil	Pedro Carlos	27 December 2007	Orléans-Braganza	Great-great-grandson of Emperor Pedro II (1831–1889).	Hereditary	1889	
Mexico	Carlos Felipe	6 September 2011	Habsburg-Lorraine	Great-great-grandnephew of Emperor Maximilian I (1864–1867)	Hereditary	1867	

== Asia ==
State	Head	Since	House	Relationship	Succession	Abolition	Ref(s)
Afghanistan	Muhammad Zahir Khan	4 June 2024	Barakzai	Grandson of King Zahir Shah (1933–1973). (Note: Ahmad Shah, second son of the last reigning king, was Crown Prince of Afghanistan from 26 November 1942 until the monarchy's end in 1973.)	Hereditary	1973	
Burma	Soe Win	12 January 2019	Konbaung	Great-grandson of Thibaw Min (1878–1885)	Hereditary	1885	
Champasak	Keo Champhonesak	17 March 1980	Khun Lo	Grandson of last ruling King Ratsadanay (1900–1904)	Hereditary	1904	
China	Jin Yuzhang	10 April 2015	Aisin Gioro	Great-great-grandson of the Daoguang Emperor (1820–1850); Nephew of the Xuantong Emperor (1908–1912; 1932–1945)	Hereditary	1912 (Qing dynasty) 1945 (Manchukuo)	
Iran (Pahlavi)	Reza	27 July 1980	Pahlavi	Heir apparent and son of Shah Mohammad Rezā (1941–1979). (Note: Rezā, eldest son of the last reigning shah, was Crown Prince of Iran from birth, on 31 October 1960, until the monarchy was deposed in 1979.)	Hereditary	1979	
Iran (Qajar)	Mohammad Hassan Mirza II	5 May 1988	Qajar	Great-grandson of Shah Mohammad Ali (1907–1909).	Hereditary	1925	
Iraq	Ra'ad bin Zeid	18 October 1970	Hāshim (Note: The name "Hashimites" refers to members of the Hāshim clan, a sept of the Quraysh tribe to which the Prophet Muhammad belonged.)	Relative of King Faisal II (1939–1958). (Note: Ra'ad's father, Prince Zeid, was appointed Head of the Royal House of Iraq following the assassination of King Faisal II during the coup d'état in 1958. Zeid was the son of Hussein bin Ali, King of Hejaz.)	Hereditary	1958	
Johor (Singapore)	Tengku Muhammad Shawal	27 March 2009	Bendahara	4th-great-grandson of Sultan Hussein Shah (1819–1835).	Hereditary	1824	
Korea	Yi Won (Note: Yi Ku appointed Yi Won, one of his first cousins once removed, as his heir in 10 July 2005 before his death. The status of Yi Won as the leader of Jeonju Lee Royal Family Association, however, didn't become valid until 22 July 2005. Yi Won later officially became the director of the family association on June 27, 2007.)	16 July 2005	Yi (Note: The House of Yi consists of the descendants of the Joseon dynasty.)	Great-grandson of Emperor Gojong (1897–1907). Grandnephew of Emperor Sunjong (1907–1910).	Hereditary	1910	
Korea	Andrew Lee (Note: Andrew Lee was adopted by a claimant to the head of the house, Yi Seok. Seok claimed that, in the will of late crown princess Yi Bangja, he was named as "first successor". Since 2023, Andrew Lee was recognized as a king of the Joseon Cybernation by the government of Antigua and Barbuda.)	Between 9 December 2021 and 17 January 2022 (Note: According to archives of Yi Seok's website, he abdicated to Andrew within that timeframe.)	Yi	Declared successor by Yi Seok, who is a grandson of Emperor Gojong (1897–1907) and nephew of Emperor Sunjong (1907–1910).	Hereditary	1910	
Laos	Soulivong Savang	19 September 1997 (Note: After the monarchy was abolished in 1975, the senior members of the royal family were imprisoned by the military. The deaths of the former King, Queen, and Crown Prince were confirmed by the Lao authorities on 17 December 1989. The dates of actual death were not released, but the current heir, who is the eldest son of the late Crown Prince, escaped imprisonment and arrived in Thailand on 3 August 1981. He was confirmed as the successor to his grandfather by the Royal Council in Exile on 19 September 1997.)	Khun Lo	Grandson of King Sisavang Vatthana (1959–1975).	Hereditary	1975	
Ottoman Empire	Harun Osman Osmanoğlu	18 January 2021	Osman	Great-grandson of Sultan Abdul Hamid II (1876–1909). (Note: The sultans of the Ottoman Empire also held the title Caliph of Islam, thus claiming to be the spiritual leaders of all Muslims. The Ottoman Caliphate was abolished by the Grand National Assembly of Turkey in 1924.)	Hereditary	1922	
Riau-Lingga	Tengku Hendra Syafri Riayat Syah	Between 2 May 2012 and 2022 (Note: Tengku Hendra Syafri Riayat Shah serves as the Yang Dipertuan Besar (Head) of the Perhimpunan Zuriat dan Kerabat Kesultanan Riau-Lingga (Association of Descendants and Relatives of the Riau-Lingga Sultanate), which was established on 2 May 2012. However, there is no clear, publicly recorded date in available Indonesian media sources indicating exactly when he was appointed to this position. Reports confirm that he had been serving as its head by at least 2022.)	Bendahara	5th-great-grandson of Sultan Abdul Rahman Muazzam Shah (1830–1832).	Hereditary	1911	
Ryūkyū	Mamoru Shō	30 August 1996	Shō	Great-great-grandson of King Shō Tai (1848–1879).	Hereditary	1879	
Sarawak	Jason Desmond Anthony Brooke	27 May 2017	Brooke	Great-grandnephew of Rajah Vyner (1917–1946).	Hereditary	1946	
Sulu	Muedzul Lail Tan Kiram	16 February 1986	Kiram	Son of Sultan Mohammed Mahakuttah Abdullah Kiram (1974–1986).	Hereditary	1915	
Syria	Ra'ad bin Zeid	18 October 1970	Hāshim	Half-nephew of King Faisal I (1920).	Hereditary	1920	
Vietnam	Bao Ngoc	15 March 2017	Nguyen Phuc	Eldest son of Emperor Duy Tân (1907–1916)	Hereditary	1945	
Yemen	Ageel bin Muhammad	6 August 1996	Rassid	Eldest son of King Muhammad al-Badr (1962). (Note: Many of the kings of the Qasimid dynasty also held the title Imam and Commander of the Faithful, and were the spiritual leaders of the Zaidiyyah branch of Shi'a Islam. The Imamate ended with the republican revolution in 1962.)	Hereditary	1962	

=== India and Pakistan ===
State	Head	Since	House	Relationship	Succession	Abolition	Ref(s)
Alipura	Manvendra Singh		Parihar	Grandson of last ruling Rao Bahadur Raja Raghuraj Singh	Hereditary	1950	
Alwar	Jitendra Singh	15 February 2009	Kachhwaha	Grandson of last ruling Maharaja Tej Singh Prabhakar	Hereditary	1949	
Amb	Salahuddin Saeed Khan Tanoli		Tanoli	Grandson of last ruling Nawab Muhammad Farid Khan	Hereditary	1969	
Bahawalpur	Nawab Salahuddin Abbasi	14 April 1988	Abbasi	Grandson of last ruling Nawab Sadeq Mohammad Khan V	Hereditary	1955	
Balasinor	Salauddin Khan Babi	25 January 2018	Babi	Son of last ruling Nawab Muhammad Salabat Khan	Hereditary	1949	
Bamra	Nitesh Ganga Deb	1997		Grandson of last ruling Raja Bhanuganga Tribhuban Deb	Hereditary	1948	
Baramba	Tribikram Chandra Deb Birabara Mangaraj Mahapatra	1979		Grandson of last ruling Raja Narayan Chandra Birabara Mangaraj Mohapatra	Hereditary	1948	
Baria	Tushar Singh	14 February 2015		Grandson of last ruling Maharawal Jaydeep Singh	Hereditary	1948	
Baroda	Samarjitsinh Gaekwad	2012	Gaekwad	Great-grandson of last ruling Maharaja Pratap Singh Rao Gaekwad	Hereditary	1949	
Barwani	Manvendra Singh	2007	Sisodia	Son of last ruling Maharana Devi Singh	Hereditary	1948	
Bastar	Kamal Chandra Bhanj Deo	1996	Bhanj	Grand nephew of last ruling Maharaja Pravir Chandra Bhanj Deo	Hereditary	1948	
Benares	Anant Narayan Singh	25 December 2000	Narayan	Son of last ruling Maharaja Vibhuti Narayan Singh	Hereditary	1948	
Bengal and Murshidabad	Abbas Ali Meerza	13 August 2014	Najafi	Nephew of Nawab Waris Ali Mirza	Hereditary	1884	
Bharatpur	Vishvendra Singh	July 1995	Sinsiniwar Jat	Son of last ruling Maharaja Brijendra Singh	Hereditary	1947	
Bhavnagar	Vijayrajsinhji Virbhadrasinhji Gohil	26 July 1994	Gohil	Grandson of last ruling Maharaja Rao Krishna Kumarsinhji Bhavsinhji	Hereditary	1948	
Bundi	Vanshvardhan Singh	2 April 2022	Hada Chauhan		Hereditary	1949	
Bhopal	Saif Ali Khan	22 September 2011	Khan	Grandson of last ruling Nawab Hamidullah Khan	Hereditary	1949	
Bushahr	Vikramaditya Singh	10 July 2021		Son of last ruling Raja Virbhadra Singh	Hereditary	1948	
Carnatic Sultanate	Muhammed Abdul Ali	4 July 1993		Son of Prince Ghulam Mohammed Abdul Khader of Arcot	Hereditary	1855	
Chamba	Prem Singh	21 May 1971	Mosana	Son of last ruling Raja Lakshman Singh	Hereditary	1948	
Charkhari	Jayant Singh	1977	Bundela	Son of last ruling Maharaja Jayendra Singh	Hereditary	1947	
Chhatarpur	Kunwar Vikram Singh	2006	Parmar	Grandson of last ruling Maharaja Bhavani Singh Bahadur	Hereditary	1950	
Chhota Udaipur	Jai Pratap Sinhji	2005	Chauhan	Son of last ruling Maharawal Virendrasinhji	Hereditary	1948	
Chitral	Fateh-ul-Mulk Ali Nasir	20 October 2011	Katur	Son of last ruling Mehtar Muhammad Saif ul-Mulk Nasir	Hereditary	1969	
Chuda	Krishnakumarsinhji	1999	Jhala	Son of last ruling Thakore Shri Dharmendrasinhji	Hereditary	1948	
Danta	Riddhiraj Singh	16 July 2023	Parmar	Great-Grandson of last ruling Maharana Bhavanisinhji	Hereditary	1948	
Datia	Arunaditya Singh Judeo	April 2020	Bundela	Great-great-grandson of last ruling Maharaja Govind Singh Judeo	Hereditary	1950	
Dewas Senior	Vikram Singh Rao II Puar	19 June 2015	Puar	Grandson of last ruling Maharaja Krishnajirao III	Hereditary	1948	
Dhenkanal	Kamakhya Prasad Singh Deo	August 1965		Son of last ruling Raja Shankar Pratap Singh Dev	Hereditary	1948	
Dholpur	Dushyant Singh	2015	Bamraulia	Grandson of last ruling Maharaja Udaybhanu Singh	Hereditary	1949	
Dhrangadhra	Sodhsalji Mayurdhwajsinhji	1 August 2010	Jhala	Son of last ruling Maharaja Meghrajji III	Hereditary	1948	
Dhrol	Padmarajsinhji		Jadeja	Great-great-grandson of Thakore Saheb Shri Harisinhji Jaisinhji (1886-1914)	Hereditary	1948	
Dungarpur	Harshvardhan Singh	19 August 2023	Sisodia	Grandson of last ruling Maharawal Laxman Singh	Hereditary	1947	
Faridkot	Amarinder Singh Brar	2017	Brar	Grand-nephew of last ruling Maharaja Harinder Singh Brar	Hereditary	1948	
Gondal	Himanshusinhji	31 January 2022	Jadeja	Great-grandson of last ruling Maharaja Thakur Sahib Bhojrajji Bhagwatsimhji	Hereditary	1949	
Gwalior	Jyotiraditya Scindia	2001	Scindia	Grandson of last ruling Maharaja Jivajirao Scindia	Hereditary	1948	
Hunza	Ghazanfar Ali Khan	18 March 1976		Son of last ruling Mir Muhammad Jamal Khan	Hereditary	1974	
Hyderabad	Azmet Jah	14 January 2023	Asaf Jah	Great-grandson of last Nizam Osman Ali Khan	Hereditary	1948	
Hyderabad	Raunaq Yar Khan	2 March 2023	Asaf Jah	Great-grandson of Nizam Sir Mir Mahboob Ali Khan, the VIth Nizam of Hyderabad. Democratically elected by the largest faction of the extended Asaf Jahi family, represented by the Majlis-E-Sahebzadagan Society (MESS).	Hereditary	1948	
Idar	Rajendra Singh	1992	Rathore	Grandson of last ruling Maharaja Himmat Singh	Hereditary	1948	
Indore	Usha Devi Holkar	1961	Holkar	Daughter of last ruling Maharaja Yashwant Rao Holkar II	Hereditary	1948	
Jaipur	Padmanabh Singh	2011	Kachwaha	Great-grandson of last ruling Maharaja Man Singh II	Hereditary	1948	
Jaisalmer	Chaitanya Raj Singh	28 December 2020	Bhati	Great-great-grandson of last ruling Maharawal Jawahir Singh	Hereditary	1947	
Jammu and Kashmir	Karan Singh	April 1961	Dogra	Son of last ruling Maharaja Hari Singh	Hereditary	1952	
Janjira	Shah Mahmud Khan	1 April 1972	Siddi	Son of last ruling Nawab Sidi Muhammad Khan	Hereditary	1948	
Jasdan	Satyajitkumar Khachar	1989		Grandson of last ruling Darbar Saheb Shri Ala Khachar	Hereditary	1948	
Jashpur	Ranvijay Singh Judev	4 October 1982	Chauhan	Grandson of last ruling Raja Vijay Bushan Singh Judeo	Hereditary	1948	
Jhabua	Narendra Singh	2002	Rathore	Grandson of last ruling Raja Dilip Singh	Hereditary	1948	
Jhalawar	Chandrajit Singh	24 April 2004	Jhala	Grandson of last ruling Maharaj Rana Harisch Chandra Singh	Hereditary	1949	
Jind	Satbir Singh	7 September 1959	Phulkian	Grandson of last ruling Maharaja Ranbir Singh	Hereditary	1948	
Jodhpur	Gaj Singh II	26 January 1952	Rathore	Son of last ruling Maharaja Hanwant Singh	Hereditary	1947	
Junagadh	Mohammad Ali Murtaza Khanji	20 July 2023	Babi	Great-Grandson of last ruling Nawab Muhammad Mahabat Khan III	Hereditary	1948	
Kalahandi	Anant Pratap Deo	2 September 2019	Nagvanshis	Grandson of last ruling Maharaja Pratap Keshari Deo	Hereditary	1948	
Kalat	Suleman Daud	1998	Ahmadzai	Grandson of last ruling Khan Mir Ahmad Yar Khan	Hereditary	1948	
Kangra-Lambagraon	Aishwarya Chand Katoch	30 December 2021	Katoch		Hereditary	1947	
Kapurthala	Sukhjit Singh	19 July 1955	Ahluwalia	Grandson of last ruling Maharaja Jagatjit Singh	Hereditary	1947	
Karauli	Krishan Chandra Pal	1984	Jadon	Grandson of last ruling Maharaja Ganeshapal	Hereditary	1949	
Keonjhar	Dhananjay Bhanj Deo	1 December 2019	Bhanj	Grand-nephew of last ruling Raja Balabhadra Narayana Bhanja Deo	Hereditary	1948	
Khairpur	Abbas Raza Khan Talpur	5 October 2026	Talpur	Son of the last ruling Mir, George Ali Murad Khan	Hereditary	1954	
Khilchipur	Priyavrat Singh	31 July 2006	Chauhan	Grandson of last ruling Raja Yashodar Singh	Hereditary	1948	
Kishangarh	Brajraj Singh	16 February 1971	Rathore	Son of last ruling Maharaja Sumar Singh	Hereditary	1947	
Kolhapur	Shahu II	1983	Bhonsle	Son of last ruling Maharaja Shahaji II	Hereditary	1949	
Kota	Ijyaraj Singh	29 January 2022	Chauhan	Grandson of last ruling Maharaja Bhim Singh II	Hereditary	1948	
Kutch	Hanvantsinhji	28 May 2021	Jadeja	Son of last ruling Maharaja Madansinhji	Hereditary	1948	
Kutlehar	Budhishwar Pal	4 August 2014		Son of last ruling Raja Sahib Sri Mahendrapal	Hereditary	1947	
Lakhtar	Balbhadrasinhji	1970	Jhala	Son of last ruling Thakore Saheb Shri Indrasinhji	Hereditary	1947	
Las Bela	Jam Kamal Khan	3 February 2013		Grandson of last ruling Jam Ghulam Qadir Khan	Hereditary	1955	
Limbdi	Jaideepsinhji	25 January 2020	Jhala	Son of last ruling Thakore Saheb Shri Chhatarsalji	Hereditary	1947	
Loharu	Ala-uddin Ahmad Khan II	12 June 1983		Son of last ruling Nawab Amin ud-din Ahmad Khan	Hereditary	1947	
Maihar	Akshayraj Singh		Kachhwaha		Hereditary	1948	
Manipur	Leishemba Sanajaoba	1996		Grandson of last ruling Maharaja Bodhchandra Singh	Hereditary	1949	
Mayurbhanj	Praveen Chandra Bhanj Deo	15 September 2000	Bhanj	Grandson of last ruling Maharaja Pratap Chandra Bhanj Deo	Hereditary	1949	
Mewar	Lakshyaraj Singh	2 April 2025	Sisodia	Grandson of last Maharana Bhupal Singh	Hereditary	1948	
Mewar	Vishvaraj Singh	25 November 2024	Sisodia	Grandson of last Maharana Bhupal Singh	Hereditary	1948	
Muli	Jitendrasinhji		Parmar	Grandson of last ruling Thakore Saheb Shri Harischandrasinhji	Hereditary	1950	
Mysore	Yaduveer Krishnadatta Chamaraja Wadiyar	28 May 2015	Wadiyar	Great-grandson of last ruling Maharaja Jayachamarajendra Wadiyar	Hereditary	1948	
Nagar	Qasim Ali Khan	2011	Maghlot	Grandson of last ruling Mir Shaukat Ali Khan	Hereditary	1974	
Narsinghgarh	Rajyavardhan Singh	24 January 2019	Parmar	Son of titular Maharaja Bhanu Prakash Singh	Hereditary	1948	
Nawanagar	Shatrusalyasinhji	3 February 1966	Jadeja	Son of last ruling Maharaja Digvijaysinhji	Hereditary	1948	
Nilgiri	Jayant Chandra Mardaraj Harichandan	30 May 2001	Bhanj		Hereditary	1948	
Oudh	Sahibzada Shahanshah Mirza	28 January 2022	Awadh	Great-Great-Grandson of Wajid Ali Shah	Hereditary	1859	
Panna	Chhatrasal II	29 January 2023	Bundela	Great-great-grandson of last ruling Maharaja Yadvendra Singh Judeo	Hereditary	1950	
Pataudi / Bhopal	Saif Ali Khan	22 September 2011	Pataudi	Grandson of last ruling Nawab Iftikhar Ali Khan Pataudi	Hereditary	1948	
Patialia	Amarinder Singh	June 1974	Phulkian	Son of last Maharaja Yadavindra Singh	Hereditary	1948	
Patna	Kanak Vardhan Singh Deo	2004	Chauhan	Grandson of last ruling Maharaja Rajendra Narayan Singh Deo	Hereditary	1948	
Phaltan	Ramraje Pratapsinh	2004	Naik Nimbalkar	Grandson of last ruling Raja Shrimant Sir Malojirao Naik-Nimbalkar	Hereditary	1948	
Pratapgarh	Jai Singh Sisodia	29 November 2017	Sisodia	Grandson of last ruling Maharawat Ram Singh Sisodia	Hereditary	1949	
Pudukkottai	R. Rajagopala Tondaiman	16 January 1997	Tondaiman	Nephew of last ruling Raja Rajagopala Tondaiman	Hereditary	1948	
Puri/Khurda Kingdom	Dibyasingha Deba	7 July 1970	Bhoi	Grandson of last colonial-era Gajapati Maharaja Ramchandra Deva IV	Hereditary	1947	
Raghogarh	Digvijaya Singh	1967		Son of last ruling Raja Balbhadra Singh	Hereditary	1947	
Rajkot	Mandhatasinhji Jadeja	27 September 2018	Jadeja	Grandson of last ruling Thakore Saheb Pradyumansinhji Lakhajirajsinhji	Hereditary	1948	
Rajpipla	Raghubir Singh	2 February 1963	Gohil	Grandson of last ruling Maharana Vijaysinhji	Hereditary	1948	
Rampur	Muhammad Kazim Ali Khan	5 April 1992	Rohilla	Grandson of last ruling Nawab Raza Ali Khan	Hereditary	1947	
Rewa	Pushparaj Singh	20 November 1995	Baghel	Son of last ruling Maharaja Martand Singh	Hereditary	1947	
Sachin	Mohammad Reza Khan		Siddi	Descendant of last ruling Nawab Sidi Mohammad Haydar Khan	Hereditary	1948	
Sailana	Vikram Singh	1990	Rathore	Grandson of last ruling Raja Dileep Singh	Hereditary	1948	
Sangli	Vijay Singh Madhavrao Patwardhan	9 March 1965	Sangli	Son of last ruling raja Chintamanrao Dhundirao Patwardhan	Hereditary	1948	
Santrampur	Paranjay Aditya Sinhji	1991	Parmar	Son of Maharana Krishna Kumar Sinhji	Hereditary	1950	
Sikkim	Wangchuk Namgyal	29 January 1982	Namgyel	Son of Chogyal Palden Thondup Namgyal (1963–1975).	Hereditary	1975	
Sirmur	Lakshyaraj Prakash	May 2013	Prakash	Great-grandson of last ruling Maharaja Rajendra Prakash	Hereditary	1948	
Sirohi	Raghuveer Singh	1998	Chauhan		Hereditary	1949	
Surguja	T. S. Singh Deo	2001	Raksel	Great-grandson of last ruling Maharaja Ramanuj Saran Singh Deo	Hereditary	1948	
Talcher	Rajendra Chandra Deb		Kachhwaha		Hereditary	1948	
Tehri Garhwal	Manujendra Shah Sahib Bahadur	7 January 2007	Parmar	Son of last ruling Maharaja Manabendra Shah	Hereditary	1949	
Thanjavur	Babaji Rajah Bhonsle Chattrapathi	1985	Bhonsle	6th generation descendant of Raja Serfoji II (1787–1832)	Hereditary	1855	
Tigiria	Bir Pratap Singh Deo	1 December 2015		Son of last ruling Raja Brajraj Mahapatra	Hereditary	1948	
Tonk	Aftab Ali Khan	4 September 1994	Salarzai		Hereditary	1949	
Travancore	Moolam Thirunal Rama Varma	16 December 2013	Venad Swaroopam	Nephew of last ruling Maharaja Chithira Thirunal Balarama Varma	Hereditary	1949	
Tripura	Pradyot Bikram Manikya Deb Barma	28 November 2006	Manikya	Son of last ruling Maharaja Kirit Bikram Kishore Deb Barman	Hereditary	1949	
Wadhwan	Chaitanya Dev Sinhji		Jhala	Grandson of last ruling Thakur Sahib Joravar Sinhji	Hereditary	1948	
Wankaner	Kesridevsinh Jhala	4 April 2021	Jhala	Great-grandson of last ruling Maharana Raj Sahib Amarsinhji Banesinhji	Hereditary	1947	

=== Nepal ===
Nepal's numerous small monarchies were collectively abolished by the federal government on 7 October 2008. At the time, the thrones of both Salyan and Jajarkot had been vacant since the deaths of Rajas Gopendra Bahadur and Prakash Bikram respectively (both in 2003), and have remained vacant.

State	Head	Since	House	Relationship	Succession	Abolition	Ref(s)
Nepal	Gyanendra	28 May 2008 (Note: Gyanendra reigned as King of Nepal between 7 November 1950 and 8 January 1951, and again from 4 June 2001 until the monarchy was abolished in 2008.)	Shah (Note: Members of the Shah dynasty of Nepal are descended from the Parmar clan of Rajputs from the former state of Narsinghgarh in modern India.)	Last reigning Maharajdhiraja (2001–2008).	Hereditary	2008	
Bajhang	Vinod Bahadur	7 October 2008 (Note: Binod is the eldest son of Princess Shanti Singh of Nepal (one of the ten people who died in the Nepalese royal massacre). Binod is also the Director of Hotel Sherpa.)	Shah	Last reigning Raja (1989–2008).	Hereditary (Note: Succession to the throne, whilst hereditary, is also subject to confirmation from the reigning King of Nepal.)	2008	
Mustang	Jigme Singe Palbar Bista	16 December 2016	Lo	Son of last ruling King Jigme Dorje Palbar Bista	Hereditary	2008	

=== South Yemen ===
State	Head	Since	House	Relationship	Succession	Abolition	Ref(s)
Qu'aiti	Ghalib II	17 September 1967	al-Qu'aiti	Last ruling Sultan (1966–1967)	Hereditary	1967	

=== Thailand ===
State	Head	Since	House	Relationship	Succession	Abolition	Ref(s)
Chiang Mai	Wongsak Na Chiangmai	1989	Thipphachak	Grandson of Kaew Nawarat (1910–1939), the last King of Lan Na and Prince Ruler of Chiang Mai	Hereditary	1939	
Lamphun	Watthanan Na Lamphun	21 February 1995	Thipphachak	Grandson of last Prince Ruler Chakkham Khachonsak (1911–1943)	Hereditary	1943	

== Europe ==
State	Head	Since	House	Relationship	Succession	Abolition	Ref(s)
Achaea	Constantine	2017	Zaccaria de Damalà	14th and 13th-great-grandson of the last two Princes of Achaea, Centurione II Zaccaria (1404–1432) and John Asen Zaccaria (1453–1454).	Hereditary	1432/1454	
Albania	Leka	30 November 2011	Zogu	Grandson of King Zog I (1928–1939).	Hereditary	1939 de facto 1944 de jure	
Austria-Hungary (more)	Karl	4 July 2011 (Note: On 31 May 1961, Karl's father Otto renounced all claims to the Austrian throne in order to return from exile. He relinquished his position as head of the House of Habsburg to Karl on 1 January 2007.)	Habsburg-Lorraine (Note: A branch of the House of Lorraine cognatically descended from the House of Habsburg. The ducal family of Modena, which was historically descended from the House of Este, traditionally uses the name Austria-Este, which has continued to be adopted as a title by the current line.)	Grandson of Emperor and King Charles I & IV (1916–1918). (Note: The Austro-Hungarian monarch held the crowns of Austria and Hungary, and also reigned as King of Bohemia, King of Croatia, etc.)	Hereditary	1918	
Bulgaria	Simeon II	15 September 1946 (Note: Simeon II reigned as Tsar of Bulgaria from 28 August 1943 until the monarchy was deposed in the Communist revolution of 1946. After returning to the country from exile in 1996, he later served as Prime Minister between 24 July 2001 and 17 August 2005.)	Saxe-Coburg and Gotha-Koháry (Note: A branch of the House of Saxe-Coburg and Gotha, A sept of the Ernestine branch of the House of Wettin.)	Last reigning Tsar (1943–1946).	Hereditary	1946	
France (Legitimist)	Louis Alphonse	30 January 1989	Bourbon (Note: The House of Bourbon is a branch of the Capetian Dynasty.)	9th-great-grandson of King Louis XIV (1643–1715).	Hereditary	1830	
France (Orléanist-Unionist)	Jean	21 January 2019	Orléans (Note: A branch of the House of Bourbon.)	4th-great-grandson of King Louis Philippe I (1830–1848).	Hereditary	1848	
France (Bonapartist)	Charles	3 May 1997 (Note: Charles Napoléon is the current head of the House of Bonaparte. His son, Jean Christophe, was posthumously appointed heir to the imperial claim in the will of his grandfather, Louis Napoléon.)	Bonaparte	Great-great-grandnephew of Emperor Napoleon I (1804–1814, 1815).	Hereditary	1870	
France (Bonapartist)	Jean-Christophe	3 May 1997	Bonaparte	Great-great-great-grandnephew of Emperor Napoleon I (1804-1814, 1815).	Hereditary	1870	
(Georgia (country)) Georgia	David	16 January 2008	Mukhrani (Note: A branch of the House of Bagrationi. During the partition of the kingdom in the 15th Century, the Bagratid dynasty split into two main lineages: the Mukhrani line of Kartli claiming the throne by virtue of being the genealogically senior line, and the Gruzinsky line of Kakheti claiming the throne by virtue of having produced the last reigning monarch. It is between these two lineages that the leadership of the Royal House of Georgia is now disputed. However, the current rival pretenders were married between 2009 and 2013 and had a son Giorgi, who is heir apparent to both claims, thus making their unification in the near future almost certain.)	13th-great-grandson of King Constantine II (1478–1505).	Hereditary	1801	
(Georgia (country)) Georgia	Ana	1 March 2025	Gruzinsky	4th-great-granddaughter of King George XII (1798–1800).	Hereditary	1801	
Greece	Pavlos	10 January 2023	De Grèce	Son and heir apparent of King Constantine II (1964–1973).	Hereditary	1973	
Lithuania	Inigo	9 February 1991	Urach	Grandson of King Mindaugas II (1918).	Hereditary	1918	
Montenegro	Nicholas	24 March 1986	Petrović-Njegoš	Great-grandson of King Nicholas I (1910–1918).	Hereditary	1918	
Portugal	Duarte Pio	24 December 1976	Braganza (Note: A branch of the House of Aviz.)	Great-grandson of King Miguel I (1828–1834).	Hereditary	1910	
Romania	Margareta (Note: Margareta's father Michael I reigned as King of Romania between 20 July 1927 and 8 June 1930, and again from 6 September 1940 until the monarchy's abolition during the Communist revolution of 1947. A rival claim to the throne is maintained by the descendants of Carol Lambrino, Michael's elder half-brother from his father's first marriage. Carol Lambrino's eldest son, Paul-Philippe, has maintained his claim to the throne since his father's death on 27 January 2006.)	5 December 2017	Hohenzollern-Sigmaringen (Note: A line of the House of Hohenzollern.)	Daughter of King Michael I (1927–1930 and 1940–1947).	Hereditary	1947	
Romania	Paul-Philippe	27 January 2006	Hohenzollern-Sigmaringen	Grandson of King Carol II (1930–1940).	Hereditary	1947	
Russia	Maria Vladimirovna	21 April 1992	Romanov (Note: The House of Romanov went extinct in agnatic line in 1762. The current Romanovs line of the House of Holstein-Gottorp, which itself is a branch of the House of Oldenburg. Nicholas Kirillovich's branch is a cadet branch of the House of Leiningen agnatically. Maria Vladimirovna's heir, George Mikhailovich, is agnatically part of the Hohenzollern family.)	Great-great-granddaughter of Emperor Alexander II (1855–1881). (Note: Full title: Emperor and Autocrat of All the Russias, used since 1721, although commonly designated Tsar. The emperors of Russia were also the Grand Dukes of Finland from 1809 until 1917, and the Kings of Poland from 1815 until 1916.); Recognised by Russian Orthodox Church.	Hereditary	1917	
Russia	Nicholas Kirillovich	1 June 2013	Romanov	Great-great-great-grandson of Emperor Alexander II (1855–1881).	Hereditary	1917	
Russia	Alexis Andreevich	28 November 2021	Romanov	Great-great-great-grandson of Emperor Nicholas I (1825–1855).	Hereditary	1917	
Serbia	Alexander	3 November 1970	Karađorđević	Great-grandson of King Peter I (1903–1918)	Hereditary	1918	
Yugoslavia	Alexander	3 November 1970	Karađorđević	Son and heir apparent of King Peter II (Note: King Peter II of Yugoslavia was a grandson of King Peter I of Serbia.) (1934–1945)	Hereditary	1945	

=== Germany ===
State	Head	Since	House	Relationship	Succession	Abolition	Ref(s)
Empire
/ Brandenburg-Prussia/Germany	Georg Friedrich	26 September 1994	Hohenzollern	Great-great-grandson of Kaiser Wilhelm II (1888–1918).	Hereditary	1918	
Kingdoms
Bavaria	Franz	8 July 1996	Wittelsbach	Great-grandson of King Ludwig III (1913–1918). Also heir to the Jacobite succession.	Hereditary	1918	
Hanover	Ernst August	9 December 1987	Hanover (Note: The House of Hanover is a branch of the House of Welf, which itself is a branch of the House of Este.)	Great-great-grandson of King Georg V (1851–1866).	Hereditary	1866	
Saxony	Daniel	29 March 2022	Wettin (Note: The kings of Saxony belonged to the Albertine branch of the House of Wettin.)	Great-great-grandson of King Frederick Augustus III (1904–1918).	Hereditary	1918	
Saxony	Alexander	23 July 2012	Saxe-Gessaphe (Note: A branch of the non-European Gessaphe family Saxe-Gessaphe cognatically descended from the Wettin.)	Great-grandson of King Frederick Augustus III (1904–1918).	Hereditary	1918	
Württemberg	Wilhelm	7 June 2022	Württemberg	Relative of King William II (1891–1918). 6th-great-grandson of Duke Frederick II Eugene (1795–1797).	Hereditary	1918	
Grand Duchies					Hereditary		
Baden	Bernhard	29 December 2022	Zähringen	Great-great-great-grandson of Grand Duke Leopold I (1830–1852).	Hereditary	1918	
Hesse and by Rhine	Donatus	23 May 2013	Hesse	Relative of Grand Duke Ernst Ludwig (1892–1918).	Hereditary	1918	
Mecklenburg-Strelitz	Borwin	26 January 1996	Mecklenburg (Note: The royal family of Mecklenburg-Strelitz belongs to the Strelitz branch of the House of Mecklenburg.)	Great-great-great-grandson of Grand Duke Georg (1816–1860).	Hereditary	1918	
Oldenburg	Christian	20 September 2014	Holstein-Gottorp (Note: A branch of the House of Oldenburg.)	Great-grandson of Grand Duke Frederick Augustus II (1900–1918).	Hereditary	1918	
Saxe-Weimar-Eisenach	Michael	14 October 1988	Saxe-Weimar-Eisenach	Grandson of Grand Duke William Ernest (1901–1918).	Hereditary	1918	
Electorates
Hesse	Donatus	23 May 2013	Hesse	Relative of Prince-elector Frederick William (1847–1866). 5th-great-grandson of Landgrave Frederick II (1760–1785).	Hereditary	1866	
Duchies
Anhalt	Eduard	9 October 1963	Ascania	Son of Duke Joachim Ernst (1918).	Hereditary	1918	
Brunswick	Ernst August	9 December 1987	Hanover	Grandson of Duke Ernst August (1913–1918).	Hereditary	1918	
Saxe-Coburg-Gotha	Hubertus	3 April 2025	Saxe-Coburg and Gotha	Great-grandson of Duke Charles Edward (1900–1918).	Hereditary	1918	
Saxe-Meiningen	Konrad	4 October 1984	Saxe-Meiningen	Great-grandson of Duke Georg II (1866–1914).	Hereditary	1918	
Schleswig-Holstein	Friedrich Ferdinand	27 September 2023	Glücksburg (Note: Officially the House of Schleswig-Holstein-Sonderburg-Glücksburg, which is a branch of the House of Oldenburg.)	Great-great-great-grandnephew of Duke Christian IX (1863–1864).	Hereditary	1866	
Principalities
Hohenzollern (Note: The principalities of Hohenzollern-Hechingen and Hohenzollern-Sigmaringen were created in 1576 from the partition of the territory of Hohenzollern. When the Hechingen lineage became extinct in 1869, the heirs of the Princes of Hohenzollern-Sigmaringen reclaimed the title Prince of Hohenzollern.)	Karl Friedrich	16 September 2010	Hohenzollern-Sigmaringen	Great-great-grandson of Prince Karl Anton (1848–1849).	Hereditary	1850	
Lippe	Stephan	20 August 2015	Lippe	Grandson of Prince Leopold IV (1905–1918).	Hereditary	1918	
Lippe	Friedrich Wilhelm	15 June 1990	Lippe	Grandnephew of Prince Leopold IV (1905–1918).	Hereditary	1918	
Reuss (Note: The territory of Reuss was partitioned between the sons of the reigning prince in 1564, eventually resulting in the principalities of Reuss Elder Line and Reuss Younger Line. The elder lineage expired in 1927 through the death of Heinrich XXIV (1902–1918), and inheritance passed to the junior line of Köstritz, whose heirs now claim the title Prince Reuss.)	Heinrich XIV	20 June 2012	Reuss	Relative of Prince Heinrich XXVII (1913–1918). (Note: For details on the unusual numbering system of the Reuss-Köstritz lineage, see the main article.)	Hereditary	1918	
Schaumburg-Lippe	Alexander	28 August 2003	Lippe	Grandnephew of Prince Adolf II (1911–1918).	Hereditary	1918	
Waldeck and Pyrmont	Carl-Anton	16 December 2024	Waldeck	Great-grandson of Prince Friedrich (1893–1918).	Hereditary	1918	

=== Italy ===
Until the mid-nineteenth century, the Italian peninsula comprised a number of states, some of which were monarchies. During the Italian unification, the monarchs of such agglomerated states lost their sovereignty and their titles became purely ceremonial. The resultant throne of the Kingdom of Italy was held by the former king of Sardinia.

State	Head	Since	House	Relationship	Succession	Abolition	Ref(s)
/ Piedmont–Sardinia/Italy	Aimone	1 June 2021	Savoy	Great-great-great-grandson of King Victor Emmanuel II (1861–1878).	Hereditary	1946	
/ Piedmont–Sardinia/Italy	Emanuele Filiberto	3 February 2024	Savoy	Grandson of King Umberto II (1946).	Hereditary	1946	
Pre-unification
Modena	Lorenzo	7 February 1996	Austria-Este	Great-grandnephew of Franz Ferdinand, adopted heir of Duke Francis V (1846–1859).	Hereditary	1859	
Parma	Carlos	18 August 2010	Bourbon-Parma	Great-grandson of Duke Robert I (1854–1859). Also one of the contested heirs to the Carlist succession.	Hereditary	1859	
/Tuscany	Sigismondo	18 June 1993	Habsburg-Lorraine	Great-great-grandson of Grand Duke Ferdinand IV (1859).	Hereditary	1859	
/Tuscany	Ottaviano	2001	Medici (di Ottajano)	Descendant of the Neapolitan Medici Princes of Ottajano, declared heirs of Anna Maria Luisa de' Medici, Electress Palatine (1667–1743), last direct dynast of the main, Tuscan branch of the Medici family.	Hereditary	1737	
/Two Sicilies	Joachim	26 November 1944	Murat	4th-great-grandson of King Joachim-Napoleon (1808–1815).	Hereditary	1815	
/Two Sicilies	Pedro	5 October 2015	Bourbon-Two Sicilies (Note: This branch is known as the House of Bourbon-Two Sicilies. The right to succession is currently disputed between two branches of the family.)	Great-great-great-grandson of King Ferdinand II (1830–1859).	Hereditary	1861	
/Two Sicilies	Carlo	20 March 2008	Bourbon-Two Sicilies	Great-great-great-grandson of King Ferdinand II (1830–1859).	Hereditary	1861	

== Oceania ==
State	Head	Since	House	Relationship	Succession	Abolition	Ref(s)
(Hawaii) Hawaiʻi	Quentin Kawānanakoa	29 July 1997	Kawānanakoa (Note: The House of Kawānanakoa was a collateral line of succession of the reigning Kalākaua dynasty. The penultimate king, Kalākaua, not having had any issue of his own, adopted and appointed the head of the Kawānanakoa as heirs after his own family line which ended with his sister, the last queen Liliʻuokalani. The House of Kawānanakoa is historically recognised as providing presumptive heirs to the throne should the monarchy be revived.)	Great-grandson of David Kawānanakoa, advisor of Queen Liliʻuokalani (1891–1893).	1893		
(Hawaii) Hawaiʻi	Owana Salazar (Note: Noa Kalokuokamaile DeGuair is a descendant of the House of Kalokuokamaile, which was a collateral line of succession of the Kamehameha dynasty, the first line of Hawaiʻian kings. It became extinct in the male line during the time of the monarchy, and now survives through the female line as the House of Laʻanui. The current descendants also belong to the Wilcox lineage of English and Italian descent. His claim on the throne is disputed.)	19 September 1988	Laʻanui (Note: The House of Laʻanui consists of maternal descendants of the House of Kalokuokamaile, the seniormost branch of the chiefly House of Keōua Nui. It descends from the eldest half-brother of Hawaiʻi's first king, Kamehameha the Great, who united the small chiefdoms of the Hawaiʻian Islands under the Kamehameha dynasty in 1810. When the male heirs of this lineage died out in 1872, it was replaced by the Kalākaua dynasty who ruled till 1893. It claims closer kinship to the kingdom's first dynasty while the Kawānanakoa line claims closer kinship to the kingdom's last dynasty.)	5th-great-granddaughter of Kalokuokamaile, half-brother of King Kamehameha I (1795–1819).	1893		
Tahiti	Léopold Pōmare (Note: Recognised as the rightful heir to the Tahitian throne by a majority of the royal family's current members. He has migrated overseas, however, and currently lives in Paris.)		Pōmare	Descendant of Queen Pōmare IV (1827–1877).	1880		
Tahiti	Teriʻihinoiatua Joinville Hinoiariki Pōmare XI (Note: Recognised as the rightful heir to the Tahitian throne by some of the royal family's current members. He was crowned on 19 April 2023 in presence of 300 people, among them several Polynesian royals, and the Māori King Tūheitia Potatau Te Wherowhero VII.)	19 April 2023	Pōmare	Adopted member of the Pōmare family.	1880		

== See also ==
- Abolition of monarchy
- List of current non-sovereign monarchs
- List of last scions
- List of usurpers
- Monarchism
