= Pretender =

Someone who claims to be rightful holder of a throne that is vacant or held by another

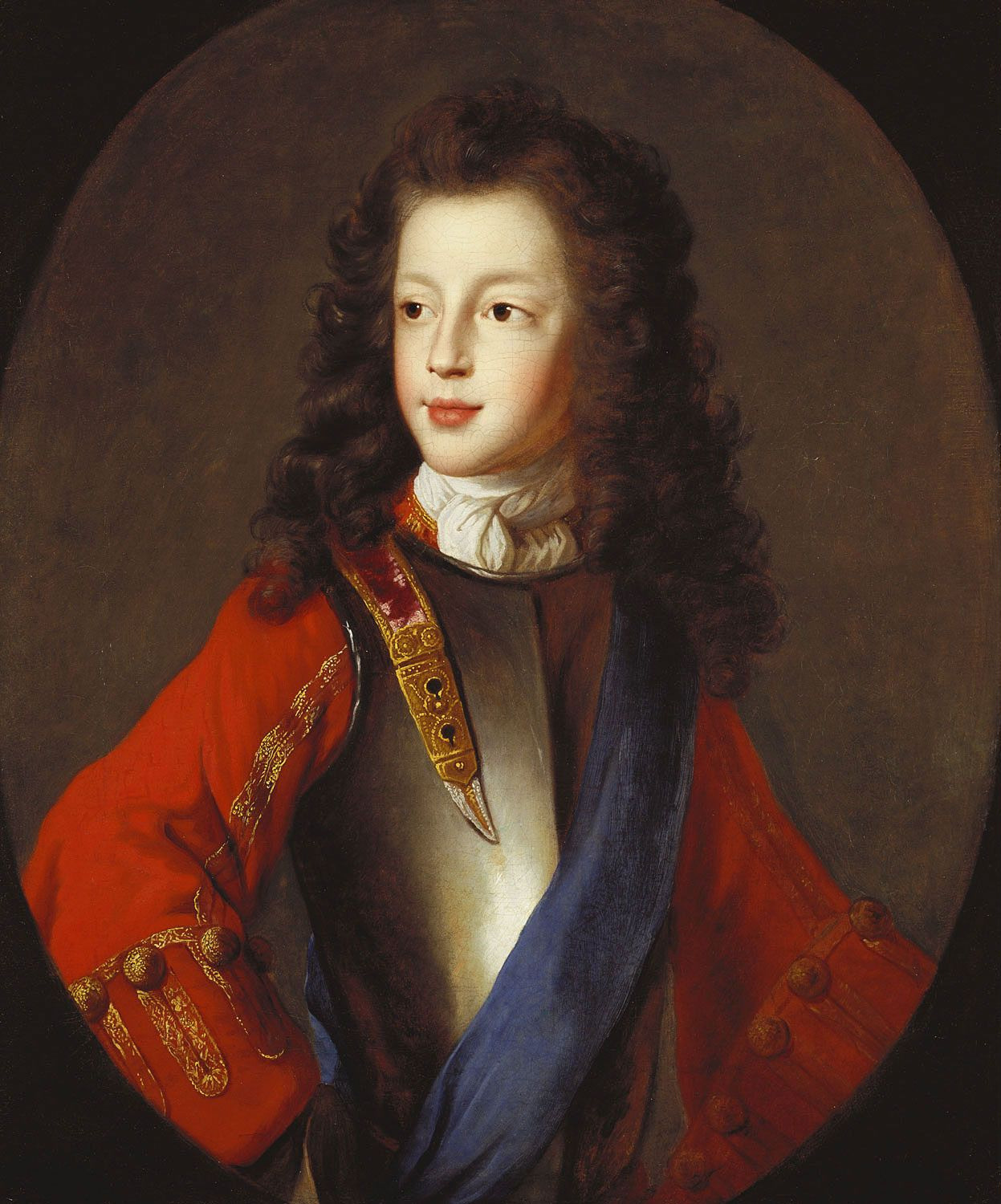
James Francis Edward Stuart, later known as the Old Pretender, depicted c. 1703, having been recognised in 1701 by King Louis XIV of France as the rightful claimant to the English, Irish, and Scottish thrones

A pretender is someone who claims to be the rightful ruler of a country although not recognized as such by the current government. The term may often be used to either refer to a descendant of a deposed monarchy or a claim that is not legitimate.

In addition, it may also refer to that of a deposed monarch, a type of claimant referred to as head of a house. In addition, it may also refer to a former monarchy.

Queen Anne popularized this word, using it to refer to her Catholic half-brother James Francis Edward Stuart, the Jacobite heir, in an address to Parliament in 1708: "The French fleet sailed from Dunkirk ... with the Pretender on board."

In 1807 the French Emperor Napoleon complained that the Almanach de Gotha continued to list German princes whom he had deposed. This episode established that publication as the pre-eminent authority on the titles of deposed monarchs and nobility, many of which were restored in 1815 after the end of Napoleon's reign.

== Etymology ==
The noun "pretender" is derived from the French verb prétendre, itself derived from the Latin praetendere ("to stretch out before", "to hold before (as a pretext)", "to extend [a claim] before"), from the verb tendo ("to stretch"), plus the preposition prae ("before, in front"). The English, French and Latin words have prima facie no pejorative connotation, although one who pretends to a position with no plausible claim or with an entirely false claim, may be differentiated as a "false pretender", see for example Perkin Warbeck.

== European Pretenders ==
=== Roman Empire ===
==== Ancient Rome ====
Ancient Rome knew many pretenders to the offices making up the title of Roman emperor, especially during the Crisis of the Third Century.

These are customarily referred to as the Thirty Tyrants, which was an allusion to the Thirty Tyrants of Athens some five hundred years earlier; although the comparison is questionable, and the Romans were separate aspirants, not (as the Athenians were) a Committee of Public Safety. The Loeb translation of the appropriate chapter of the Augustan History therefore represents the Latin triginta tyranni by "Thirty Pretenders" to avoid this artificial and confusing parallel. Not all of them were afterwards considered pretenders; several were actually successful in becoming emperor at least in part of the empire for a brief period.

==== Byzantine Empire ====
Successions to the Roman Empire long continued at Constantinople. Most seriously, after the fall of Constantinople to the Fourth Crusade in 1204, and its eventual recovery by Michael VIII Palaiologos, there came to be three Byzantine successor states, each of which claimed to be the Roman Empire, and several Latin claimants (including the Republic of Venice and the houses of Montferrat and Courtenay) to the Latin Empire the Crusaders had set up in its place. At times, some of these states and titles were subjected to multiple claims.

=== Greek throne ===
The Greek Monarchy was abolished on the 1st of June, 1973. Pavlos, Crown Prince of Greece is the current Monarch.

Many Greek Constitutions state that Princess Sophia, relinquished her rights to throne in 1962.

==== Cypriot throne ====
Following the defeat and death of King James III King of Cyprus in 1474, his younger and illegitimate brother, Eugène Matteo de Lusignan, also styled d'Arménie (died 1523) removed to Sicily, then to Malta. He was acknowledged as rightful heir to the thrones of Cyprus, Armenia, Jerusalem, and Antioch, although he never made serious efforts to pursue the claims. The title of "Barone de Baccari" was created in 1508 for Jacques Matteo (sives Eugene Matteo) d'Armenia with the remainder to his descendants in perpetuity. Eugene, illegitimate son of King Jacques II of Cyprus, had, when his family were exiled, first gone to Naples, then Sicily, then settled on Malta, marrying a Sicilian heiress, Donna Paola Mazzara (a descendant of the Royal House of Aragon of Sicily and Aragon), with issue.

==== Modern Greece ====
The claimant to the throne of the last Greek kingdom is Pavlos, Crown Prince of Greece. He belongs to the House of Schleswig-Holstein-Sonderburg-Glücksburg, the senior branch of the House of Oldenburg. His designated heir is his son Prince Constantine Alexios of Greece and Denmark.

=== French throne ===
The establishment of the First Republic and the execution of Louis XVI in 1793 led to the king's son becoming pretender to the abolished throne, styled as Louis XVII. As Louis XVII was a child and imprisoned in Paris by the revolutionaries, his uncle, the Comte de Provence, proclaimed himself regent in his nephew's name. After Louis XVII died in 1795, the Comte de Provence became pretender himself, as Louis XVIII.

Louis XVIII was restored to the throne in 1814, and was succeeded by his brother Charles X in 1824. Charles X was, however, forced into exile by the July Revolution. Charles X and his son, Louis-Antoine, Duke of Angoulême, abdicated their claims in favor of Charles's grandson, Henri, Count of Chambord; however, their cousin the Duke of Orléans, a descendant of Louis XIV's younger brother, mounted the throne as Louis Philippe I, King of the French.

For most of the July Monarchy, the legitimists, as supporters of the exiled senior line came to be known, were uncertain of whom to support. Some believed the abdication of Charles and his son legal, and recognized the young Chambord as king, while others maintained that abdication was unconstitutional in France of the ancien régime, and continued to recognize first Charles X and then Louis-Antoine, until the latter's death in 1844. On his uncle's death, Chambord claimed the crown, but lived in exile and upon his death in 1883, the direct male-line of Louis XV became extinct.

In 1848, Louis Philippe was himself overthrown by the February Revolution, and abdicated the throne in favor of his young grandson, Philippe, Comte de Paris. However, a republic was proclaimed, leaving Paris, like his cousin Chambord, merely a pretender to a no longer existing crown. Over the next several decades, there were several attempts at a so-called "fusion", to unite both groups of monarchists in support of the childless Chambord as king, who would recognize the Count of Paris as his heir. Those efforts failed in the 1850s, but after the establishment of the Third Republic in 1870, when a royalist majority was elected to the Chamber of Deputies, fusion again became the monarchist strategy. As a result, in 1873 the Count of Paris withdrew his own bid for the throne and recognized Chambord as legitimate pretender to the French crown. In spite of this apparent unity among royalist forces, restoration of the monarchy was not to be; Chambord refused to accept the Tricolor flag, which rendered him unacceptable to most Frenchmen as a constitutional king. The monarchists hoped that after Chambord's death they could unite and crown the Orléanist candidate. But Chambord lived until 1883, while France's royalists had lost their majority in parliament by 1877. The erstwhile Orléanist Adolphe Thiers thus called Chambord "The French Washington", i.e. the true "founder" of the Republic.

By 1883 most French monarchists accepted the Count of Paris as head of royal house. A minority of reactionaries, the so-called Blancs d'Espagne ("Spanish Whites"), continued to withhold support from the House of Orléans and chose instead Juan, Count of Montizon, the Carlist pretender to the Spanish throne, who also happened to be the senior male descendant of Louis XIV.

The arguments are, on one side, that Louis XIV's younger grandson, Philip de Bourbon, Duke of Anjou renounced any future claim to the French throne when he left France to become king of Spain as Philip V in 1700 (the renunciation was ratified internationally by the Treaty of Utrecht), ostensibly leaving the Dukes of Orléans as heirs to the throne of France in the event of extinction of descendants of Louis XIV's elder grandson Louis, Duke of Burgundy, which occurred in 1883. On the other side, Anjou's renunciation is held to be invalid because prior to the revolution it was a fundamental tenet of the French monarchy that the crown could never be diverted from the rightful (senior line) heir of Hugh Capet. Moreover, although the Orléans volunteered to defer their rival claim to the throne after 1873, the regicidal vote of their ancestor Philippe Égalité in 1789 and the usurpation of Louis Philippe in 1830 are alleged to have extinguished all rights to the throne for the Orléans branch. The schism has continued to the present day, with supporters of the senior line reclaiming the title of "Legitimist", leaving their opponent royalists to be known, once again, as "Orléanists". The current representative of the senior line is Louis Alphonse, Duke of Anjou, the senior legitimate living descendant of Hugh Capet (and of Philip V d'Anjou of Spain) who was born and raised in Spain. The Orléanist line, which returned to live in France when the law of banishment was repealed in 1950, is represented by Prince Jean, Duke of Vendôme, senior male-line descendant of King Louis Philippe.

In addition to these two claims to the historic royal throne of France, there have also been pretenders to the imperial throne of France, created first by Napoleon Bonaparte in 1804 and recreated by his nephew Emperor Napoleon III in 1852 (abolished 1870). This claim is today disputed between Jean-Christophe, Prince Napoléon and his own father, the self-avowed republican Prince Charles Napoléon (deemed to be excluded from the succession due to a non-dynastic re-marriage), both descendants of Napoleon I's youngest brother, Jérôme Bonaparte.

=== Russian throne ===
There is much debate over who is the legitimate heir to the Russian throne, and bitter dispute within the family itself. Grand Duchess Maria Vladimirovna is considered by some to be the legitimate heir. She is the only child of Grand Duke Vladimir who died in 1992, a great-grandson of Tsar Alexander II, whom some considered the last male dynast of the House of Romanov. Some of her opponents believe she is ineligible to claim the throne because she was born of a marriage that would have been deemed morganatic under Russia's monarchy, which was abolished in 1917. Others oppose her for reasons similar to those of the anti-Orleanist rationale: her grandfather's perceived disloyalty and dynastic ambition are seen as removing any rights which might otherwise have belonged to her branch of the former dynasty.

Still others maintain that the restrictive, pre-revolutionary marital rules of the Romanovs leave no one who can claim to be rightful heir to the dynasty's legacy. Others recognized Nicholas Romanov, Prince of Russia as head of the family, being a descendant of Emperor Nicholas I and the elected president of the Romanov Family Association, which consists of most living male-line descendants of the Romanov emperors. Neither he nor his younger brother, Prince Dimitri Romanov, had sons and since their deaths no new claims have been advanced by this branch.

Anna Anderson attempted to prove she was Grand Duchess Anastasia Nikolaevna of Russia, the lost daughter of Nicholas II, but DNA testing on her remains eventually proved her to be an impersonator. Although she did not claim the throne, per se, as women could not succeed to the Russian throne so long as any male dynast survived, she became more famous than any of the various Romanov claimants to the throne.

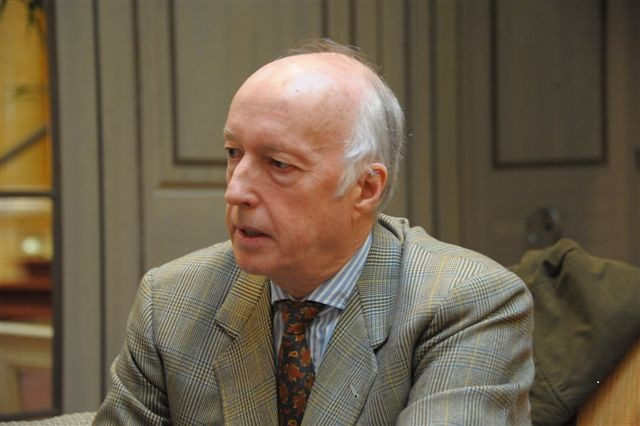
Karl Emich of Leiningen, also known under his Christian Orthodox name Nikolai Kirillovich Romanov

Prince Karl Emich of Leiningen (born 1952), who converted to the Eastern Orthodoxy in 2013, is the latest pretender to the Russian throne under the name of Prince Nikolai Kirillovich of Leiningen. He is the grandson of Grand Duchess Maria Cyrillovna of Russia, (sister of Vladimir, and aunt of Maria Vladimirovna), and great-grandson of Cyril Vladimirovich, Grand Duke of Russia. The Monarchist Party of Russia supports Prince Nikolai as the heir of the Russian throne, since they are of the opinion that Maria Vladimirovna Romanova and Nicholas Romanov are not dynasts. In early 2014, Nikolai Kirilovich declared himself Emperor Nicholas III (successor to Nicholas II).

In 2007 Nicholas married Countess Isabelle von und zu Egloffstein and in 2010 had a son, Emich.

=== Spanish throne ===
The Carlist line has claimed the throne of Spain after Ferdinand VII was succeeded by his daughter Isabella II instead of his brother Infante Carlos María Isidro, Count of Molina. Their claim was defended in several wars during the 19th centuries. Following the death of the last senior-line claimant, Infante Alfonso Carlos, Duke of San Jaime in 1936, Prince Xavier of Bourbon-Parma became regent and later claimed the throne as Javier I. However, following the death of Xavier in 1977, the Carlist succession was in disarray as the heir, Prince Carlos Hugo of Bourbon-Parma, held left-wing socialist views that were viewed as incompatible with Carlism, and thus an incompatible claimant, leaving his younger, more conservative brother the Duke of Aranjuez as a rival claimant. As of 2024, the two legitimate claimants to the Carlist succession are Prince Sixtus Henry of Bourbon-Parma, Duke of Aranjuez and his nephew Prince Carlos, Duke of Parma and Piacenza.

=== Portuguese throne ===
In Portugal, the Miguelist pretender to the Portuguese throne originated from the Liberal Wars in which Pedro IV, a supporter of Brazilian independence and Emperor of Brazil whilst being proclaimed the king went to war with his brother Miguel I as Miguel believed that Pedro had deserted his right to the throne by becoming the Emperor of Brazil. His brother also represented the conservative faction of the Kingdom of Portugal, supporting absolute monarchy over constitutional monarchy. Pedro only served as monarch for a short period time before passing the throne to his daughter, Maria II of Portugal. As the liberals won the Liberal Wars, Maria retained power as Queen of Portugal and forced her uncle into exile, himself also serving as king for 6 years during the wars. During the remainder of the existence of the Kingdom of Portugal, Miguel's descendants claimed the title of Duke of Braganza. Today, the Miguelist pretender serves as the sole claimant of the Portuguese monarchy and the House of Braganza after the death of Manuel II of Portugal, Portugal's last monarch, without any children. Duarte Pio, Duke of Braganza, currently serves as the Head of the Royal House of Portugal while being a descendant of Miguel.

=== British throne ===
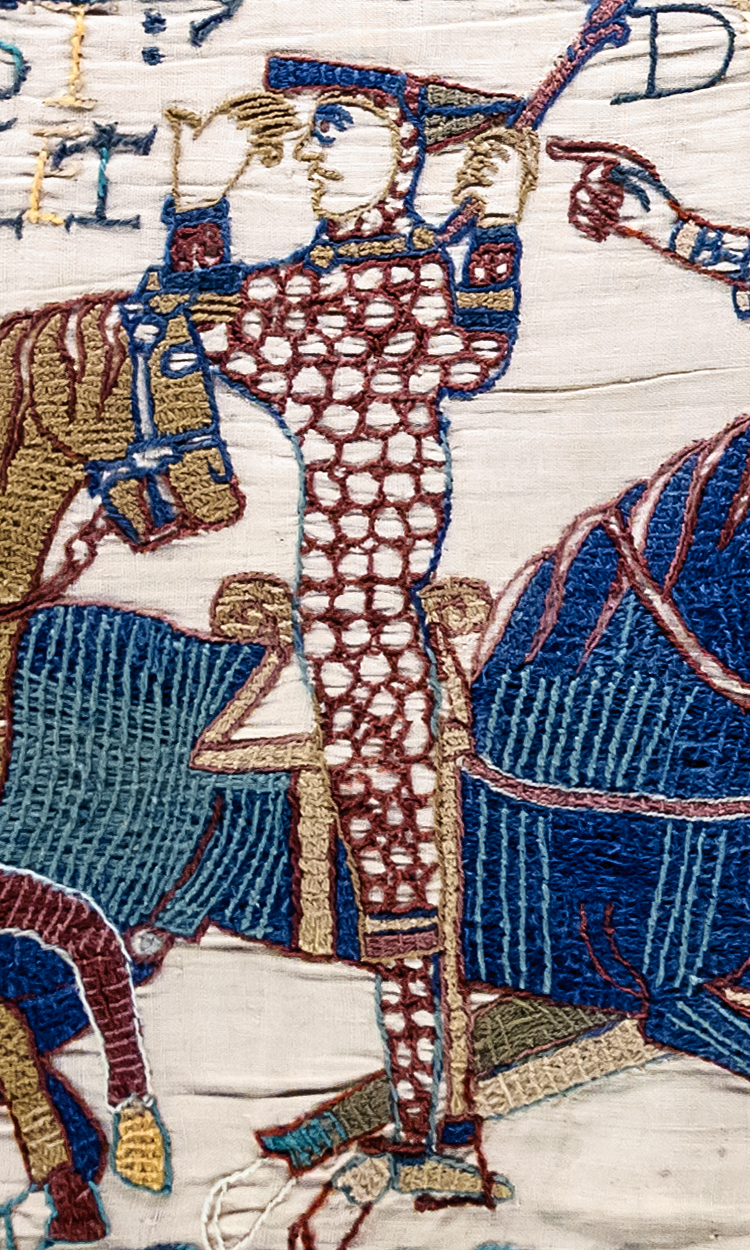
William, Duke of Normandy pretending to the English throne early in the Battle of Hastings in 1066 in opposition to King Harold II

==== England, Scotland and Ireland ====
Around the turn of the 16th century, Henry VII (whose claim to the throne dynastically was incredibly tenuous) had to deal with several pretenders claiming to be various members of York family. The most famous of the pretenders were Lambert Simnel (c. 1477 – c. 1525) who claimed to be Edward Plantagenet, 17th Earl of Warwick (the last male line Yorkist) and Perkin Warbeck (c.1474–1499) who claimed to be Richard of Shrewsbury, Duke of York, the younger son of Edward IV who had disappeared in the summer of 1483.

Simnel (whose real name is unknown) came to the attention of a priest in Oxford by the name of Richard Simon who believed the boy bore a resemblance to Edward IV's sons. He originally tried to pass him off as the Duke of York but changed tactics to try to pass him off as Warwick (Edward IV's nephew) when he heard a false report that Warwick had died in Henry VII's custody. Simon took his young charge to Dublin, a hotbed for Yorkist sympathizers, where he was crowned Edward VI in May 1487. An attempted invasion supported by Margaret of York and John de la Pole, Edward IV's sister and nephew, the latter of whom had been heir apparent to Richard III before his death, was quickly put down at the Battle of Stoke Field the next month by Henry VII during which de la Pole was killed in the fighting. Henry realized that since Simnel was only about ten years old, he was unlikely to be anything other than a pawn being manipulated by adults. He decided to show the boy mercy by granting him a pardon and taking him into the royal household as a servant. Simnel remained a loyal employee of the royal family for the rest of his life, eventually working his way up to holding the prestigious job of a falconer.

Warbeck, on the other hand, proved to be a much more persistent and costly threat. He first appeared in 1490 at the court of his "aunt" Margaret of York in Burgundy, claiming that his elder brother Edward V had been killed in 1483 by Richard III's men but that an unnamed "lord" had taken pity on him since he was only 9 and let him run away under the promise that he wouldn't make himself public until he was an adult. Historians debate whether or not Margaret (who had never met either of her brother's sons) truly believed Warbeck to be her nephew or merely wanted to cause trouble for Henry VII but she nonetheless tutored him in the ways of the English court. Warbeck drifted around to various courts in Europe for several years before unsuccessfully trying to invade England in 1495. After that, he found his way to the Scottish court where he was warmly welcomed by James IV, who arranged for Warbeck to marry one of his relatives, Lady Catherine Gordon.

Warbeck was caught in Cornwall during a second invasion attempt in September 1497. He was paraded through the streets of London and then sent to prison in the Tower after being captured but was soon let out when he confessed to being an imposter. Henry VII treated Warbeck well after this, allowing him to stay at court but separated from his wife who was put under Queen Elizabeth's watch. However, it did not last as he was executed in 1499 after being caught trying to escape his captivity with the real Earl of Warwick.

Warbeck claimed that he was the son of a municipal official in modern-day Belgium but some historians believe he may have been genuinely related to the York family. His resemblance to Edward IV was said to be uncanny and he was likewise very tall just as Edward IV and several of his siblings were. It has been theorised he could have been a bastard son or nephew of Edward IV's as the York family had ties to that region of the continent and he himself had fled there when he was briefly deposed in 1471, which would match with Warbeck's rough date of conception. Francis Bacon was an early advocate of the theory that he was one of Edward's many bastards.

After the execution by the English Parliament of Stuart King Charles I in 1649, his son Charles II was proclaimed king in Scotland (where he was crowned in 1651) and Ireland; but those two countries were invaded by English forces and annexed to the Commonwealth of England under Oliver Cromwell in 1653. Thus, Charles II was pretender to the throne of England from 1649 to the restoration of 1660, and exiled/deposed King of Scots and King of Ireland, 1653 to 1660. He died in 1685 and his brother James II and VII came to the throne. He had converted to Catholicism but this only became a worry when his second wife bore a son who would precede his two Protestant daughters. James was thus deposed by his elder daughter and his son-in-law (who was also his nephew, son of his sister Mary) during the Glorious Revolution in December 1688; they were formally offered the English and Scottish thrones by their respective parliaments a month later – which was still 1688 in England (where New Year's Day was 25 March until 1752) but was already 1689 in Scotland (which adopted 1 January as New Year's Day in 1600). James made several attempts to regain the throne before his death in 1701, the most important of which was an effort he made with Irish support – that country having not yet acceded to the succession of William and Mary – which led to the Battle of the Boyne and the Battle of Aughrim, and set the stage for the subsequent Jacobite risings (or rebellions). These were a series of uprisings or wars between 1688 and 1746 in which supporters of James, his son ("The Old Pretender") and grandson ("The Young Pretender") attempted to restore his direct male line to the throne.

- James Francis Edward Stuart, the Catholic son of the deposed James II and VII, was barred from the succession to the throne by the Act of Settlement 1701. Notwithstanding the Act of Union 1707, he claimed the separate thrones of Scotland, as James VIII, and of England and Ireland, as James III, until his death in 1766. In Jacobite terms, Acts of Parliament (of England or Scotland) after 1688 (including the Acts of Union) did not receive the required royal assent of the legitimate Jacobite monarch and, therefore, were without legal effect. James was responsible for a number of conspiracies and rebellions, particularly in the Highlands of Scotland. The most notable was the Jacobite rising of 1715–16.
- Charles Edward Stuart ("Bonnie Prince Charlie"), James Francis' elder son and the would-be Charles III, who led in his father's name the last major Jacobite rebellion, the Jacobite rising of 1745–46. He died in 1788 without legitimate issue.
- Henry Benedict Stuart (best known as the Cardinal-Duke of York), the younger brother of Charles Edward and a Catholic Cardinal, who took up the claim to the throne as the would-be Henry IX of England, though he was the final Jacobite heir to publicly do so. He died unmarried in 1807.

After 1807, the line of James VII and II became extinct. The Jacobites had ceased to have much political significance after the failure of the 1745 uprising, and the movement essentially became completely dormant after Henry's death. Genealogically, the next most senior line to the English and Scottish thrones was through James II's youngest sister, Henriette Anne, whose daughter had married into the House of Savoy. To the very limited extent that Jacobitism survived the death of Cardinal York, they supported the claims of this line. Its current representative is Franz, Duke of Bavaria, though he himself does not claim the title, his secretary having announced once that "HRM (sic) is very content being a Prince of Bavaria".

Simon Abney-Hastings, 15th Earl of Loudoun, (1974- ) is a modern pretender and Australian Peer. He is purported by some to be the true king of Britain and the head of the House of York as the senior descendant of George Plantagenet, Duke of Clarence, who was Edward IV's brother. This is based on the assertion that Edward IV was illegitimate and that George's descendants take precedent over the descendants of Edward's eldest daughter Elizabeth who have sat on the throne since the early 16th century. He is a member of the Abney-Hastings family and also known as King Simon I. Abney-Hastings has rejected these claims but was invited to the coronation of Charles III by the royal family and keeps in contact with them.

==== Wales ====
Owain Glyndŵr (1349–1416) is probably the best-known Welsh pretender, though whether he was pretender or Prince of Wales depends upon one's source of information. Llywelyn ap Gruffydd ap Llywelyn, who died in 1282, was the only Prince of Wales whose status as ruler was formally recognised by the English Crown, though three of the four men who claimed the throne of Gwynedd between the assumption of the title by Owain Gwynedd in the 1160s and the loss of Welsh independence in 1283 also used the title or similar. Madog ap Llywelyn also briefly used the title during his revolt of 1294–95. Since 1301, the title of Prince of Wales has been given to the eldest living son of the King or Queen Regnant of England (subsequently of Great Britain, 1707, and of United Kingdom, 1801). The word "living" is important. Upon the death of Arthur, Prince of Wales, Henry VII invested his second son, the future Henry VIII, with the title. The title is not automatic, however, but merges into the Crown when a prince dies or accedes to the throne, and has to be re-conferred by the sovereign.

Nevertheless, it is Glyndŵr whom many remember as the last native Prince of Wales. He was indeed proclaimed Prince of Wales by his supporters on 16 September 1400, and his revolt in quest of Welsh independence was not quashed by Henry IV until 1409. Later, however, one of Glyndŵr's cousins, Owain Tudor, would marry the widow of Henry V, and their grandson would become Henry VII, from whom the current British monarch is descended (through his daughter Margaret Tudor, who married James IV of Scotland).

The various minor kingdoms that came together to form what is today known as the Principality of Wales each had their own royal dynasty. The most important of these realms were Gwynedd, Powys and Deheubarth. After 878 the ruling dynasties in these kingdoms each claimed descent from the sons of Rhodri Mawr who had conquered them or otherwise achieved their thrones during his reign. Merfyn Frych, the father of Rhodri Mawr, had come to power in Gwynedd because the native dynasty, known as the House of Cunedda had expired. Merfyn was descended from royalty through his own father Gwriad and claimed ancestors from among the rulers of British Rheged (in particular Llywarch Hen). It was acknowledged by all of the realms of Wales after the time of Rhodri Mawr that the House of Gwynedd (known as the House of Aberffraw) was senior and homage should be paid by each of them to the king of Gwynedd. After the reign of Owain ap Gruffudd of Gwynedd the realm began to merge with the concept of a Principality of Wales. This was realised by Owain's descendant Llywelyn ap Gruffudd in 1267. It was not to last and this new Wales was invaded by England and dismantled between 1277 and 1284. All of the descendants of Llywelyn "the last" and his brothers were either imprisoned or killed.

=== Irish throne ===
The business of Irish pretenders is rather more complicated because of the nature of kingship in Ireland before the Norman take-over of 1171. In both Ireland and early Gaelic Scotland, succession to kingship was elective, often (if not usually) by contest, according to a system known as Tanistry.

The High King of Ireland (Ard Rí) was essentially a ceremonial, federal overlord, who exercised actual power only within the realm which was his dynastic seat. Because of the laws of succession, there could not be a pretender to this title in the sense it is normally understood. From the 5th century onwards the kingship tended to remain within the dynasty of the Uí Néill until Brian Boru of Munster wrested control of much of Ireland from Máel Sechnaill mac Domnaill in 1002. Following his death in 1014 and that of Máel Sechnaill in 1022, the struggle for dominance resulted in Norman intervention from Henry II of England in 1171.

There were later attempts by Irish rulers fighting against the Normans to revive the High Kingship such as in 1258 when Brian Ua Néill of Cenel Eoghan was so acknowledged, in 1262 when the crown was offered to Haakon IV of Norway and in 1315 when an offer was made to the Scottish Edward Bruce. Effectively, the title fell into abeyance. Apart from the coronation oath, the title was not even used by the Kings of England, each of whom styled himself Lord of Ireland. In 1542 Henry VIII, styled himself "King of Ireland".

Some Irish rebels discussed offering the Irish throne to Prince Joachim of Prussia (son of Kaiser Wilhelm II) before the 1916 Easter Rising. After the failure of the Rising, the royalists were a minority among the rebels, and so the offer was never made. According to Hugo O'Donnell, 7th Duke of Tetuan, Éamon de Valera raised the idea of an Irish monarchy with his great-grandfather Juan O'Donnell.

== American pretenders ==
=== Brazilian throne ===
After the abolition of the Empire of Brazil in 1889 by a military coup d'état that gave rise to the First Brazilian Republic, the current most recognised pretender to the Brazilian throne is Bertrand of Orléans-Braganza. He is the head of the called Vassouras branch of the Imperial Family, since it was divided after the resignation of his great-uncle Pedro de Alcântara, Prince of Grão-Pará in 1908. The descendants of Pedro de Alcântara did not accept his resignation and maintained an active claim to the throne until the death of his elder son, Pedro Gastão of Orléans-Braganza in 2007, whose claim passed to his son, Prince Pedro Carlos of Orléans-Braganza, head of the Petrópolis branch.

== Asian pretenders ==
=== Kingdom of Jerusalem ===
The Emperors of Ethiopia held the title of "King of Zion" through their claim of descent from the Biblical House of David through his son King Solomon. Menelik II dropped the use of this title. The Ethiopian Emperors continued to use the honorific of "Conquering Lion of the Tribe of Judah" up until the monarchy ended with the fall of Emperor Haile Selassie in 1974.

Since the fall of the Kingdom of Jerusalem, many European rulers have claimed to be its rightful heir. None of these, however, have actually ruled over a part of the former Kingdom. Today there are several potential European claimants on the basis of the inheritance of the title. None of the claimants have any power in the area of the former Kingdom.

=== Japan ===
In the fourteenth century, two lines of the Imperial clan, Northern Court and Southern Court, claimed the throne. Their rivalry was resolved in 1392: while every emperor of the Southern Court enthroned prior to 1392 was established as legitimate, the throne was determined by Emperor Go-Komatsu of the Northern Court and his successors.

Since 1911, the Japanese government has declared the southern claimants were actually the rightful emperors despite the fact that all subsequent emperors including the then-Emperor Meiji were descended from the Northern Court, reasoning the Southern Court retained possession of the Three Sacred Treasures, thus converting the emperors of the former Northern court into mere pretenders. In other words, six former emperors of the Northern Court have been counted as pretenders instead since then. As a result of this compromise, the present Japanese Imperial Family is descended from the Northern Court Emperors.

Kumazawa Hiromichi publicly challenged Emperor Shōwa, disputing the legitimacy of his bloodline. Kumazawa claimed to be the 19th direct descendant of Emperor Go-Kameyama, the last Emperor of the Southern Court.

=== Malaysia ===
In June 2026, amid a constitutional crisis in the state of Negeri Sembilan, Tunku Nadzaruddin Tuanku Ja'afar was proclaimed as the 12th Yang di-Pertuan Besar of Negeri Sembilan (literally “He Who is Made Chief Ruler”, the head of state of Negeri Sembilan). Immediately after the proclamation, prime minister Anwar Ibrahim announced that the federal government still recognizes Tuanku Muhriz Tuanku Munawir as the rightful Yang di-Pertuan Besar. The Comptroller of the Royal Household also declared that the proclamation of Nadzaruddin as illegal. Muhriz and Nadzaruddin are first cousins through Tuanku Abdul Rahman Tuanku Muhammad, the eight Yang di-Pertuan Besar and the first Yang di-Pertuan Agong (King of Malaysia).

Unlike the other rulers of the Malay states, the Yang di-Pertuan Besar is elected rather than hereditary. The ruler is elected by a council of ruling chiefs in the state, known as the Undang Yang Empat, a royal practice that has been followed since 1773.

=== Singapore ===
Sultan Hussein Shah of Johor from the Bendahara dynasty ceded the territory of Singapore to the British in the 19th century. His descendants lived in the former royal palace until they were resettled by 1999 and now live in relative obscurity. The current claimant to the title is Tengku Muhammad Shawal bin Tengku Abdul Aziz.

== Heraldry ==
Pretence is demonstrated in heraldry by placing on the shield of the pretender an inescutcheon of the arms of the former holder of the title pretended to, known as an "inescutcheon of pretence". As well as being used by royalty, the inescutcheon of pretence is also used by English aristocratic and gentry families where a husband of an heraldic heiress (i.e. a daughter with no brothers) will display his wife's paternal arms on an inescutcheon placed within his own coat of arms. Following the husband's death the couple's son and heir will remove the inescutcheon and show it instead as a quartering.

== False pretenders ==
Throughout history people have claimed fraudulently to be displaced monarchs or heirs who had disappeared or supposedly died under mysterious circumstances. Some of them were look-alikes. Examples of pretenders include:

- Bertrand of Rais (or Ray), who claimed to be Baldwin I of Constantinople
- Thomas the Slav, who claimed to be the blinded Byzantine Emperor Constantine VI
- Lambert Simnel, who claimed to be Edward Plantagenet, 17th Earl of Warwick
- Perkin Warbeck, who claimed to be Richard of Shrewsbury, 1st Duke of York
- Gabriel de Espinosa, one of four people who claimed to be Sebastian of Portugal
- Yemelyan Pugachev, who claimed to be Peter III of Russia
- False Dmitry I, actually reigned as Tsar of Russia for nearly a year before he was killed in a riot
  - False Dmitry II
  - False Dmitry III
- Kaspar Hauser, who was claimed to be the stillborn son of Karl, Grand Duke of Baden
- False Margaret, who claimed to be Margaret, Maid of Norway
- Bou Hmara, who claimed to be a Sultan of Morocco
- False Olaf, who claimed to be Olaf II of Denmark
- Charin, who claimed to be Norodom Ekcharin, a Cambodian prince who went missing

== See also ==
- List of heads of former ruling families
- List of Indian princely states
- Royal house
- Micronation
- Monarchism
- Order of succession
- Anti-king
- Antipope
- Self-proclaimed monarchy
- Government-in-exile
