= Athagada =

Athagada Athagarh
- Town
- Location in Odisha, India Athagada (India)
- Coordinates: 20.53°N 85.62°E
- Country: India
- State: Odisha
- District: Cuttack
- Elevation: 63 m (207 ft)

Population (2011)
  - Total: 17,304

Languages
  - Official: Odia
- Time zone: UTC+5:30 (IST)
- Postal code: 754029
- Vehicle registration: OD-05
- Website: odisha.gov.in

Athagada (formerly as Athgarh) is a town (N.A.C) and a sub-division of Cuttack district in the state of Odisha, India.

== Geography ==
Athagada is located at 20.53°N 85.62°E. It has an average elevation of 63 m (207 ft).

== History ==
During the British Raj, Athagada was the capital of the Athgarh State, one of the princely states of the Eastern States Agency. The Rajguru of Athgarh lived near Gada (rani mahal).

== List of Rulers of Athgarh ==
- 1681 - 1709 Raja SriKaran Narayana Bawarta Patnaik
- 1709 - 1741 Raja SriKaran Rama Krishna Bawarta Patnaik
- 1741 - 1771 Raja SriKaran Debia Singh Bawarta Patnaik
- 1771 - 1821 Raja SriKaran Gopinath Bawarta Patnaik
- 1821 - 1825 Raja SriKaran Krishna Chandra Bawarta Patnaik
- 1825 - 1837 Raja SriKaran Rama Chandra Bawarta Patnaik
- 1837 - 1862 Raja SriKaran Bhubaneswar Bawarta Patnaik
- 1862 - 1869 Raja SriKaran Jagannath Bawarta Patnaik II (d. 1869)
- 1869 - 1893 Raja SriKaran Bhagirathi Bawarta Patnaik (b. c.1844 - d. 1893)
- 1893 - 25 Jan 1896 Raja SriKaran Raghunath Bawarta Patnaik (b. 1865 - d. 1896)
- 25 Jan 1896 - 22 Jun 1918 Raja SriKaran Vishvanath Bawarta Patnaik (b. 1885 - d. 1918)
- 25 Jan 1896 - 1908 .... -Regent
- 22 Jun 1918 - 15 Aug 1947 Raja SriKaran Radhanath Bawarta Patnaik (b.1909 - d.1983)
- 23 Aug 1983 - 30 Jan 1990 Raja SriKaran Sankar Prasad Bewarta Patnaik (b. 1948 - d. 1990)
- 30 Jan 1990 ( present ) Raja SriKaran Subhrapada Bewarta Patnaik (b. 1970- present)

== Demographics ==
As of 2001 India census, Athagad had a population of 15,850. Males constitute 51% of the population and females 49%. Athagad has an average literacy rate of 72%, higher than the national average of 59.5%; with 56% of the males and 44% of females literate. 11% of the population is under 6 years of age.

== Blocks ==
- Athagada
- Badamba
- Tigiria
- Narasinghpur

== Economy ==
Some large and medium scale industries have established their base in the area. Some of them are

T.S. Alloy

KVK Nilachal Power (P) Ltd.

Aarati steel

Maheswari Ispat Pvt Ltd

Pradhan Steel & Power Ltd

Amtek Metal &Mining Ltd

Visa Power

Arati Steel Ltd (power plant)

== Famous Places ==
Dhabaleswar

Bhattarika Temple

Charchika Temple

Ansupa Lake

== Politics ==
Current MLA from Athgarh Assembly Constituency is Ranendra Pratap Swain, who won the seat in State elections of 2004 and also in 2000 representing BJD and as a JD candidate in 1995 and 1990. Other previous MLAs from this seat were Janaki Ballabh Patnaik of INC who won this seat in 1985, Rasananda Sahoo of INC(I) in 1980, and Rasmanjari Devi of JNP in 1977.

Athgarh is part of Cuttack (Lok Sabha constituency).

== See also ==
- Athgarh
