= Dadhapatna =

- Town
- Location in Odisha, India Dadhapatna (India)
- Coordinates: 20.4319°N 85.8096°E
- Country: India
- State: Odisha
- District: Cuttack

Population (2001)
  - Total: 4,415

Languages
  - Official: Oriya
- Time zone: UTC+5:30 (IST)
- Postal code: 754005
- Vehicle registration: OD
- Website: odisha.gov.in

Dadhapatna is a census town in Barang, Cuttack district in the state of Odisha, India.

== Demographics ==
According to the 2001 India census, Dadhapatna had a population of 4415. Males constituted 53% of the population and females 47%. Dadhapatna has an average literacy rate of 73%, higher than the national average of 59.5%: male literacy is 80% and, female literacy is 64%. In Dadhapatna, 12% of the population is under 6 years of age.

== Famous sites ==
Nandankanan Zoological Park is nearly 2.5 kilometers away from Dadhapatna. There is a very famous Kanaka Durga Temple temple near Dadhapatna. This is the place where Orissa's first private industry came up in the form of a glass factory. Some historical places like Sarangagad and Chudangagad are very near to Dadhapatna. This place lies in a critical part of Bhubaneswar, Cuttack, Athagad, Banki Biggest and very oldest Market in Barang nearby Barang Railway station.
