= Satbir Singh =

Satbir Singh may refer to:

- Satbir Singh (politician) (born 1954), mayor of Delhi
- Satbir Singh (field hockey) (born 1993), Indian field hockey player
