= Tigiria =

- Block
- Location in Odisha, India
- Coordinates: 20°29′0″N 85°31′0″E
- Country: India
- State: Odisha
- District: Cuttack
- NAC: Athagad
- Named for: Former princely state

Languages
  - Official: Odia, Hindi, English
- Time zone: UTC+5:30 (IST)
- PIN: 754030
- STD code: 06723
- Vehicle registration: OD
- Ethnicity: Odia people
- Climate: Aw (Köppen)
- Avg. summer temperature: 45 °C (113 °F)
- Avg. winter temperature: 10 °C (50 °F)
- Website: odisha.gov.in

Tigiria is a tehsil (block) of Cuttack district. There are 14 (panchayats) with a total of 50 villages under the Tigiria administrative division.

Tigiria is part of the Athagarh Odisha Vidhan Sabha constituency alongside Athagad, Athagarh block and five gram panchayats (Kakhadi, Sankarpur, Badasamantarapur, Mangarajpur and Brahmapur) of the Tangi-Chowdwar block.

During the British Raj era, Tigiria was the capital of Tigiria State, one of several princely states of the Eastern States Agency and the most densely populated.
