= Tigiria State =

State in India

Coordinates: 20°29′N 85°31′E

- Princely State of British India
- 16th century–1948
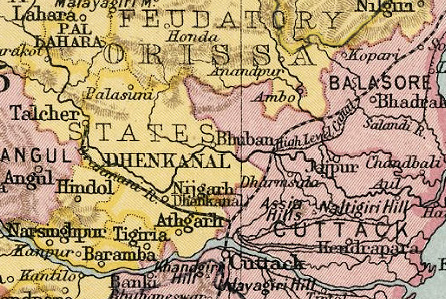
- Tigiria State in the Imperial Gazetteer of India
- Capital: Tigiria
- Area
  - 1931: 119 km^{2} (46 sq mi)
- Population
  - 1931: 24,822
- History
  - Established: 16th century
  - Accession to the Union of India: 1948
Succeeded by
India
- Today part of: Cuttack district, Odisha

Tigiria State was one of the princely states of India during the period of the British Raj. It was located in present-day Tigiria block of Cuttack district, Odisha. Although it was the smallest of the states of the Orissa States Agency it was the most densely populated. The last ruler of Tigiria joined the state to the Indian Union by signing the instrument of accession in 1948.

The state was bound in the north by Dhenkanal State, in the east by Athgarh State, in the south by the Mahanadi River and in the west by Baramba State.

== History ==
The name 'Tigiria' likely originated in the Sanskrit Trigiri, meaning "Three Hills". Most of the inhabitants of Tigiria were Hindu, members of the Chasa caste, and important places of worship were located within the area of Tigiria State.

Tigiria was founded at an uncertain date in the sixteenth century by a ruler named Nityananda Tunga of the local Kshatriya Tunga clan of Central Odisha region. According to legends he was directed to the spot in a dream while on a pilgrimage to Puri. In 1682, the Marathas granted the title of Mahapatra to Raja Sankarsen Tunga for his services. His successor Gopinath Chamupati Singh has authored the war treatise Virasarvasvam.

The last Raja Brajraj Kshatriya Birbar Chamupati Singh Mahapatra signed the accession to the Indian Union on 1 January 1948 and was the final surviving royal of the British Raj-era princely states until he died in 2015.

== Rulers ==
The rulers of Tigiria state of the Tunga dynasty.

- Nityananda Tunga (1682–1682
- Sankarsen Tunga (1682–1742)
- Gopinath Chamupati Singh (1743–1767..)
- Jadumani Rai Singh (..1767–1793)
- Jagannath Chamupati Singh (1797–1844)
- Harihar Kshatriya Birbar Chamupati Singh (1844–8 April 1886)
- Banamali Kshatriya Birbar Chamupati Singh (8 April 1886 – 1933)
- Sudarshan Kshatriya Birbar Chamupati Singh (1933–1943)
- Brajraj Kshatriya Birbar Chamupati Singh Mahapatra (1943–1 January 1948)

=== Titular ===
- Brajraj Kshatriya Birbar Chamupati Singh Mahapatra (1 January 1948 – 30 November 2015)
- Bir Pratap Birbar Kshatriya Chamupati Singh Mahapatra (30 November 2015–current)

== See also ==
- Eastern States Agency
- Orissa Province
- Political integration of India
