= Bhattarika Temple =

Temple in India

- ମା' ଭଟ୍ଟାରିକା ମନ୍ଦିର
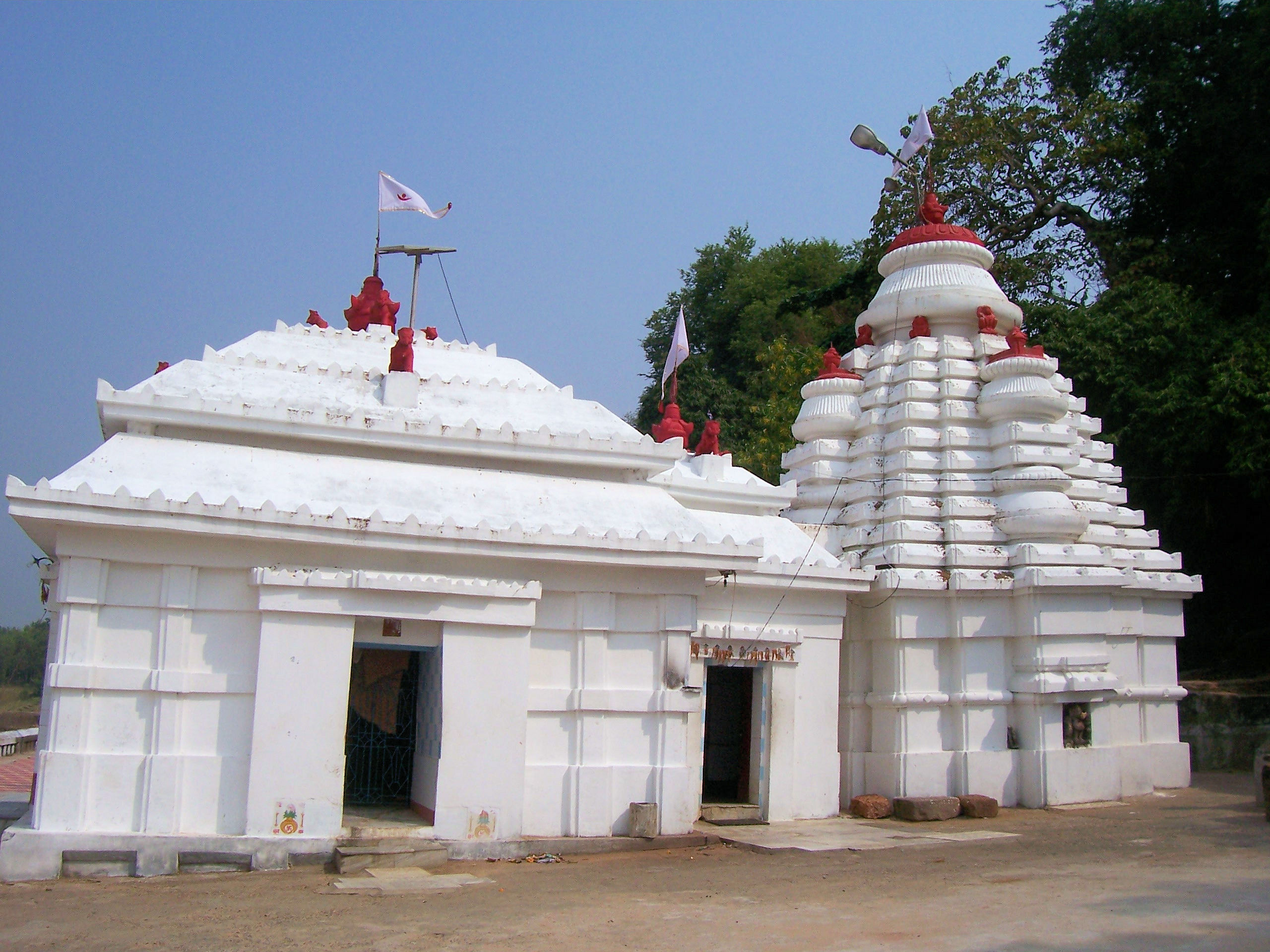
- The Bhattarika Temple

- Bhattarika Temple

Religion
- Affiliation: Hinduism
- District: Cuttack

Location
- Location: Sasanga village (Baramba)
- State: Odisha
- Country: India
- Interactive map of Bhattarika Temple
- Coordinates: 20°22′6.71″N 85°16′18.16″E

Bhattarika Temple is located on the bank of Mahanadi River, at Sasanga village in the tehsil Baramba, (formerly Athgarh), Cuttack district, Odisha, India. It is dedicated to the Hindu Goddess Maa Bhattarika worshipped as a manifestation of Shakti. As per the Puranic tradition, Parashurama, facing certain defeat at the hands of Saharsrajuna, prayed to Durga who appeared on this spot to impart her divine power to his aid. The festival Pana Sankranti is celebrated here in April, Akshaya Tritiya in May and Dussehra in October.

Durga Puja is celebrated here yearly with great rejoicing.

== Gallery ==
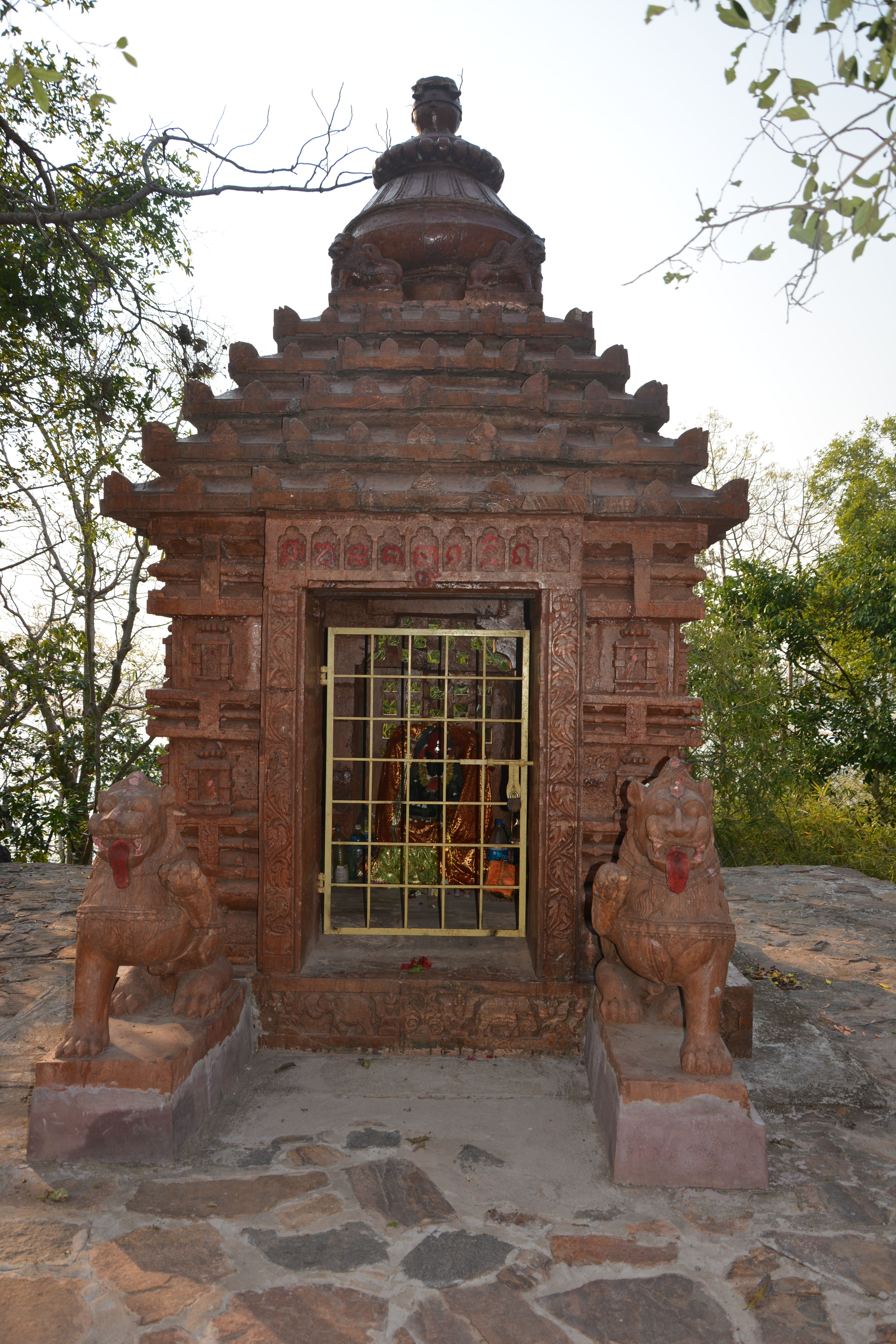
Astha Laxmi Temple

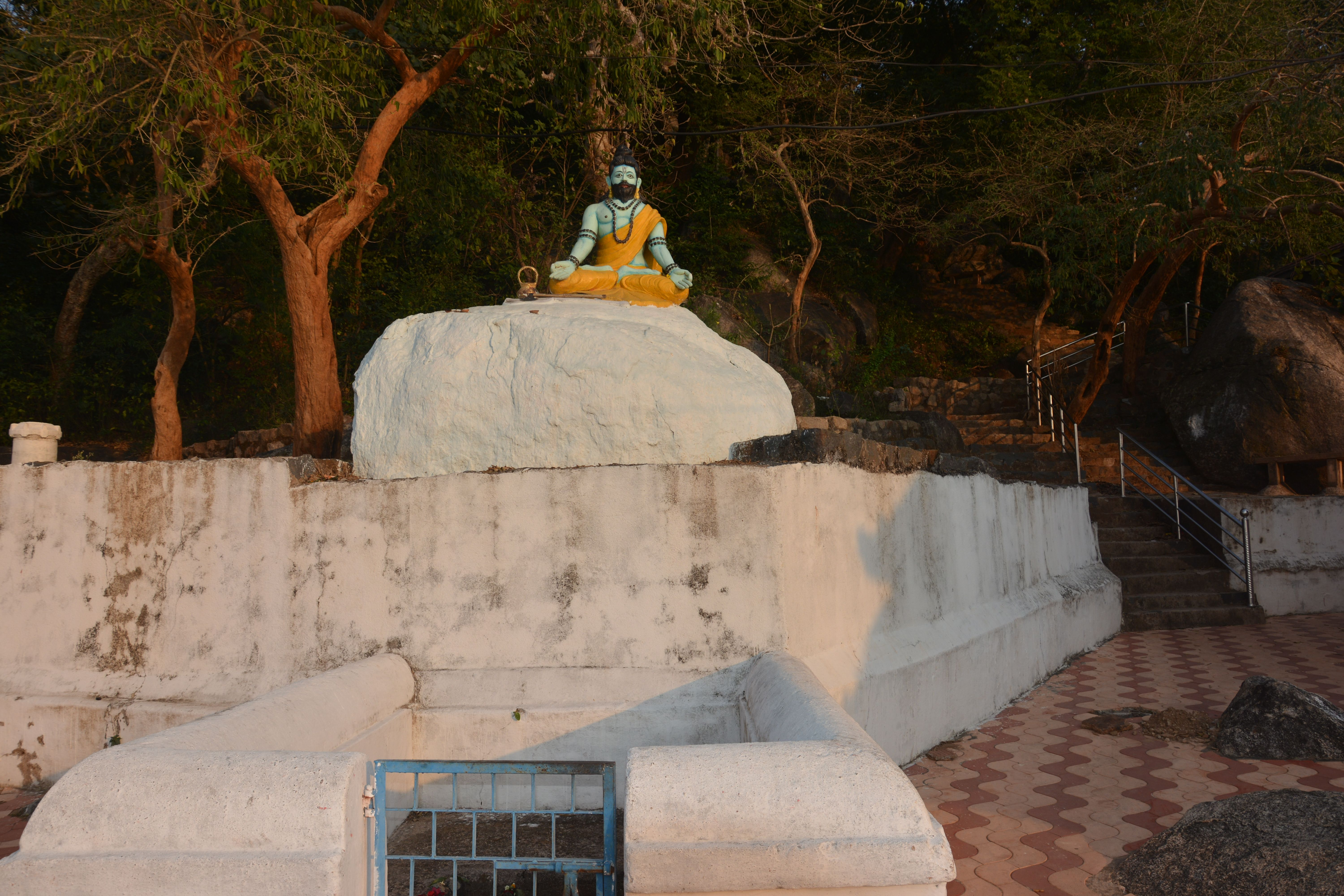
Baba Parsuram at yoga mudra

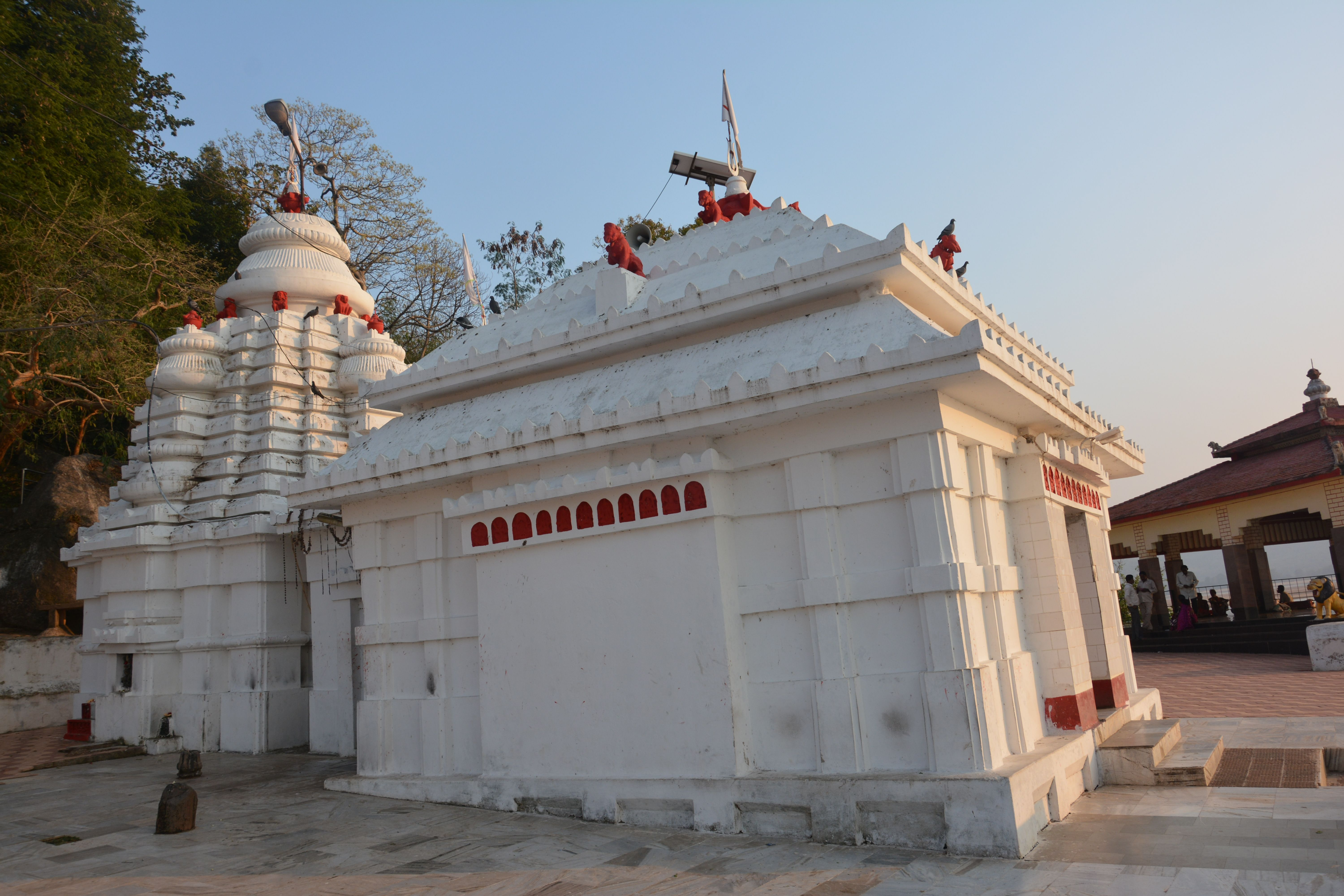
Bhattarika Temple south side view

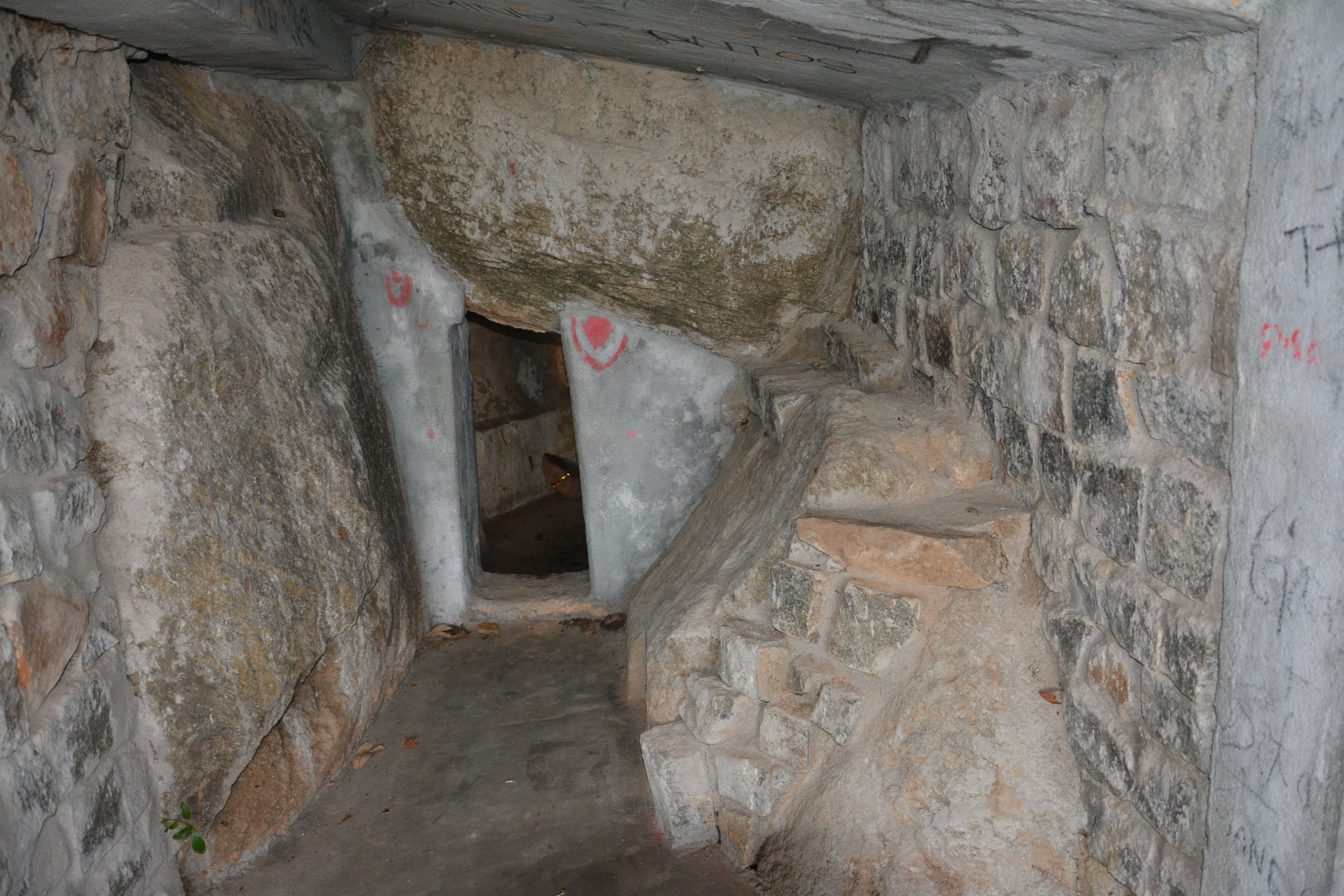
This is the place where Maa Bhattarika rests during flood.

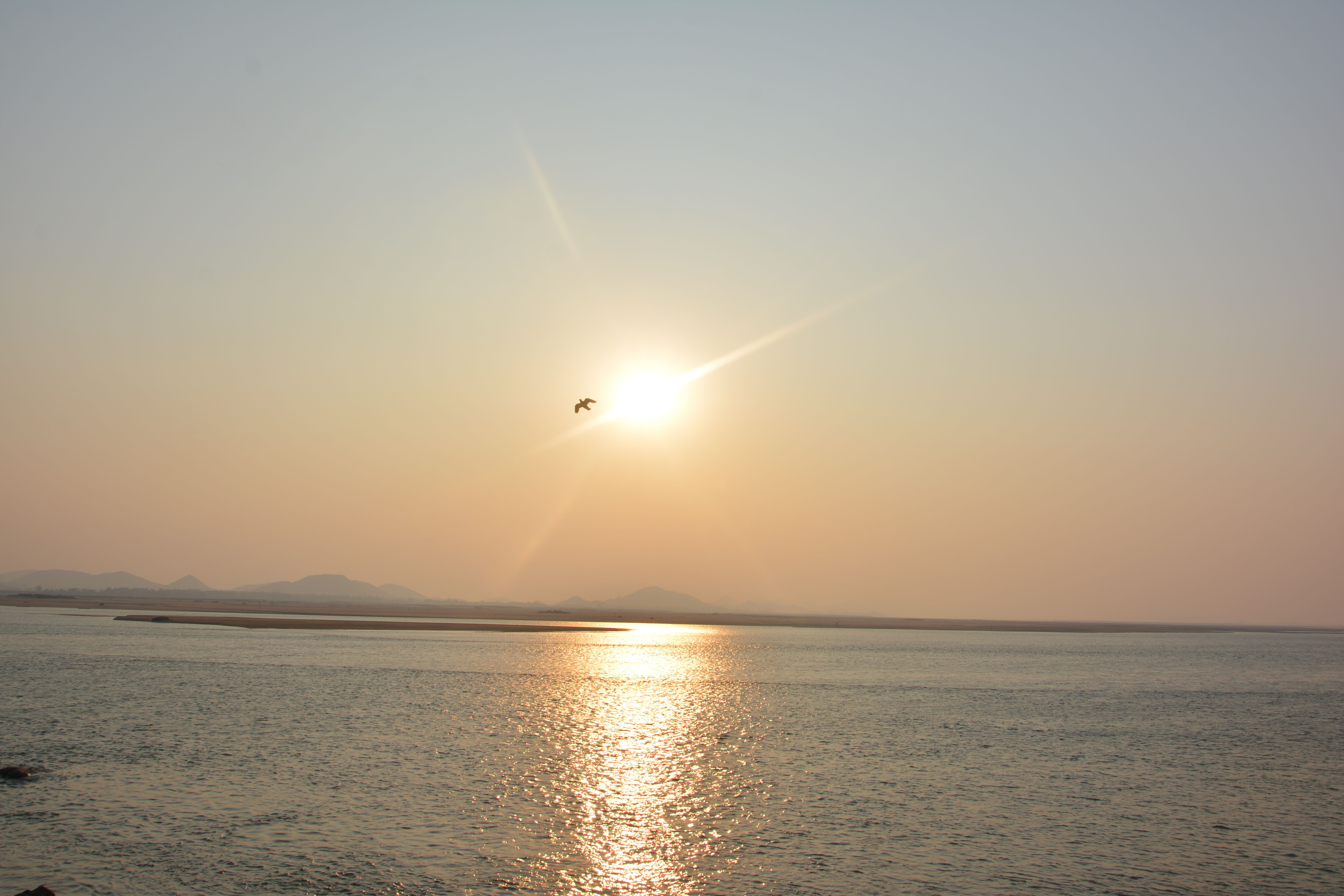
Beautiful sunset at Bhattarika

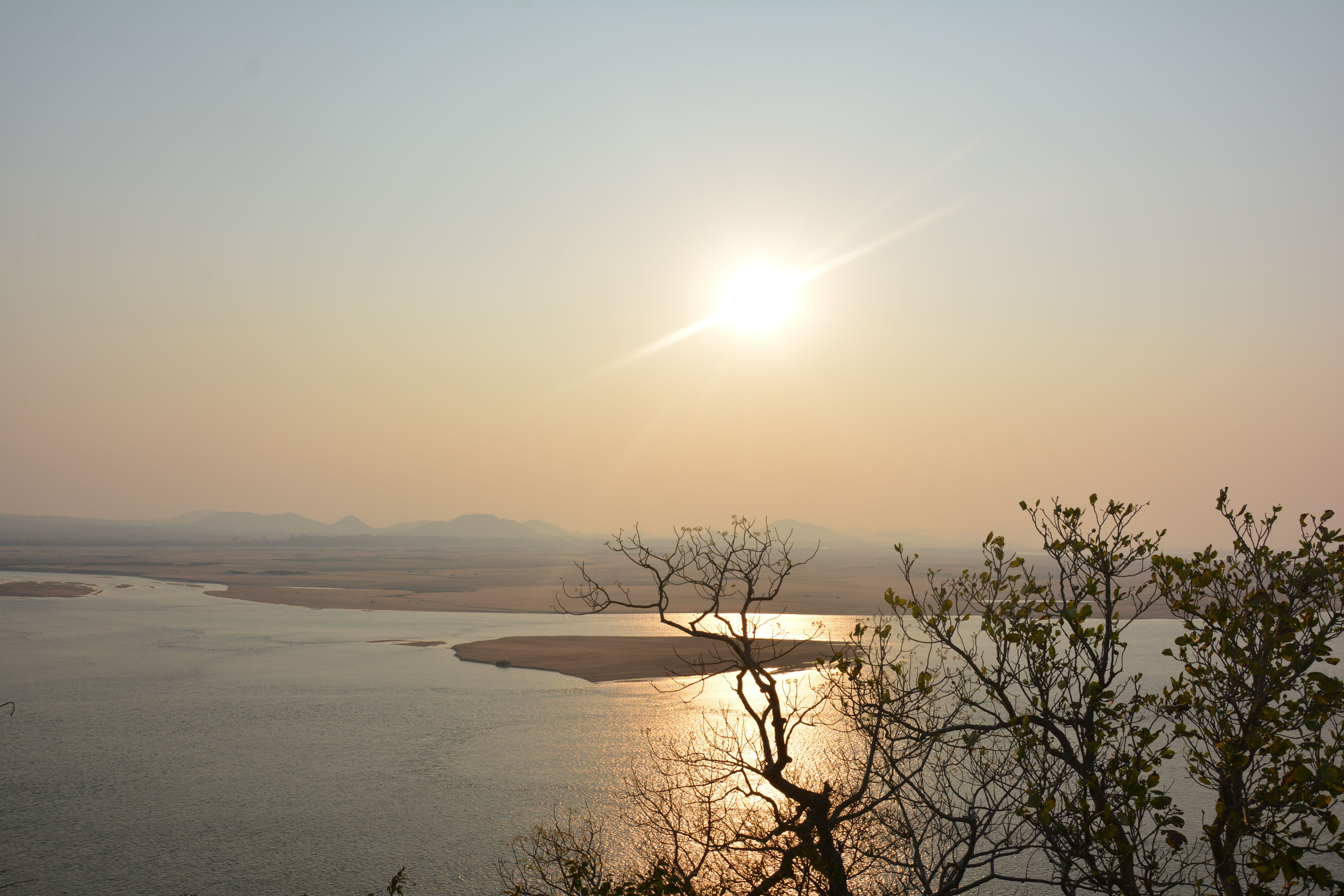
Scenic view from hilltop.
