= Brajraj Mahapatra =

Last Raja of Tigiria from 1943–1948

- Maharaja
- Born: 15 October 1921
- Died: 30 November 2015 (aged 94)
- Spouse: Rani Rasmanjari Devi
- Brajraj Kshatriya Birbar Chamupati Singh Mahapatra
- Father: Sudarshan Kshatriya Birbar Chamupati Singh Mahapatra
- Religion: Hinduism

Brajraj Kshatriya Birbar Chamupati Singh Mahapatra (15 October 1921 – 30 November 2015) was the final surviving royal of the British Raj-era "princely states" Tigiria State of Orissa.

Brajraj was born on 15 October 1921, the son of Sudarshan Kshatriya Birbar Chamupati Singh Mahapatra, Raja of Tigiria. After taking a diploma from Rajkumar College in Raipur in 1940, he married Rani Rasmanjari Devi, a princess of Sonepur, with whom he had six children. although when brajraj kingdom was taken her wife took away five sons letting his eldest son bir Pratap Singh who was declared as a maharaja politician in 2015
