= Dhabaleswar Temple =

Dhabalesvara Siva Temple
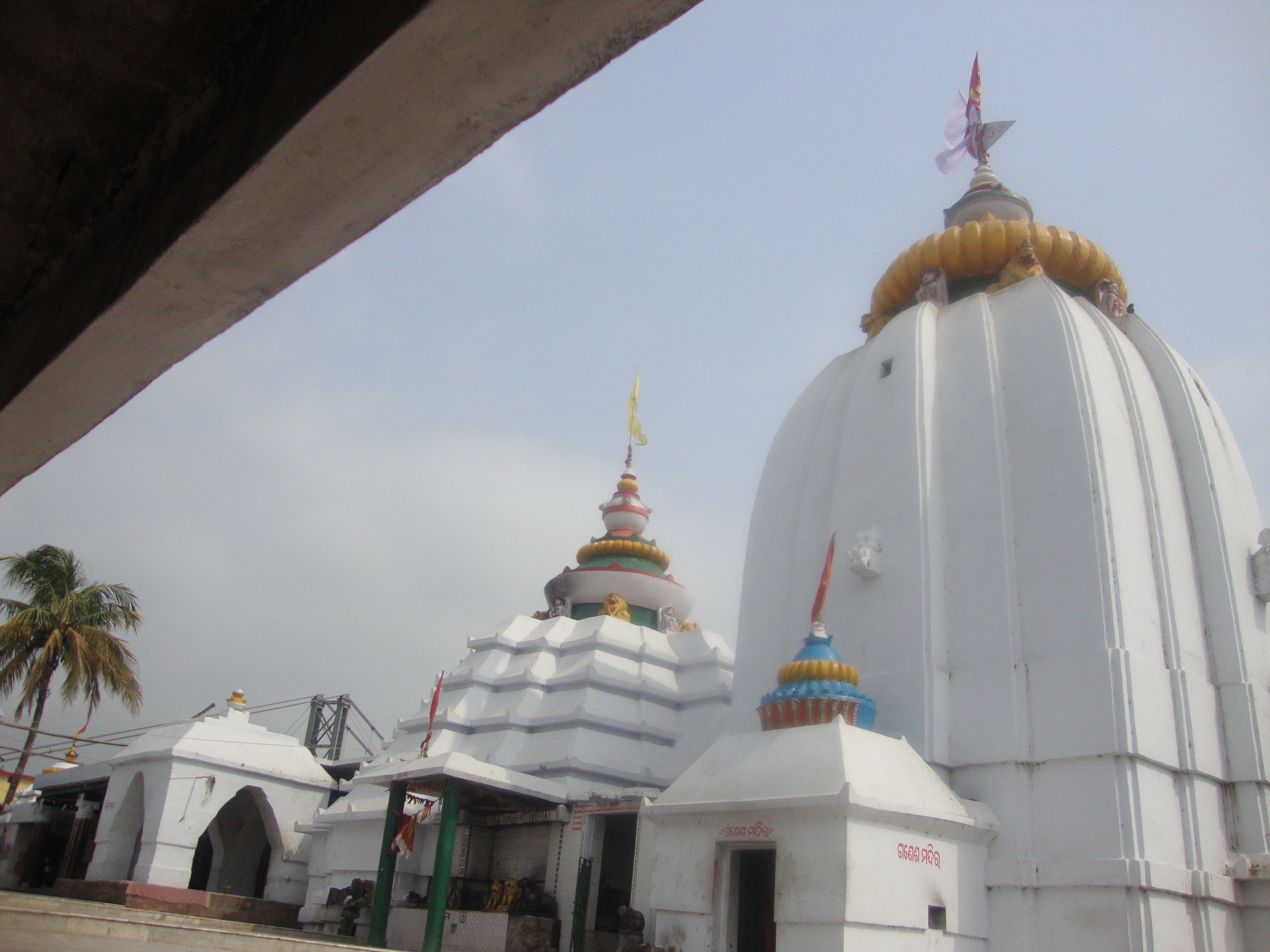

- Location in Odisha

Religion
- Affiliation: Hinduism
- Deity: Shiva

Location
- Location: Cuttack
- State: Odisha
- Country: India
- Interactive map of Dhabalesvara Siva Temple
- Coordinates: 20.504117°N 85.803524°E

Architecture
- Type: Kalinga Architecture
- Completed: 10th century CE
- Elevation: 69 m (226 ft)

Dhabaleswar Temple is dedicated to the worship of Lord Shiva. It is situated at a distance of 27 km from the city of Cuttack, Odisha, India, on the riverine island of Lord Dhabaleshwar. The temple, located on an island on River Mahanadi, is embellished with stone carvings that date back to the early 10th and 11th century. The serene ambiance, in which the temple is situated, inspires spiritual feeling among one and all.

== Mythical Origin ==
The name Dhabaleswar (Dhabala or White + Eeswar or God) is attributed to a miracle performed by Lord Shiva. Once a thief stole a black bull calf from a village and fled to a Shiva temple. He hid himself with the calf in the sanctum while the angry crowd waited outside the temple. The crowd could clearly hear the calf calling out. The thief prayed fervently to Lord Shiva to deliver him from the crowd. Taking pity on him, the Lord appeared as a Sanyassin before the crowd and asked them the cause of their agitation On being told that they suspected the thief of hiding in the sanctum along with the black calf, the sanyassin brought the calf outside to dispel their doubts. The calf turned out to be white, seeing which the crowd let the thief go. The sanyassin disappeared and the thief realized who had come to his aid. He confessed and apologized to the crowd. He took a vow to spend the rest of his life in the service of the Lord. The act of turning a black calf to white caused Lord Shiva to be also known as Dhabaleswara.

== Present Temple ==
The temple structure was constructed during the rule of Somavamshi dynasty by King Yayati Keshari.The present day temple was renovated and repaired by rulers of the Athgarh State.

== Reaching the Temple ==
The temple can be reached by bus via Chowdwar, Nuapatana, Mancheshwar. It can also be reached via Bidanasi through boating on river Mahanadi during previous days but now a bridge has been made by odisha govt. Odisha's first ever foot hanging bridge is connecting the exotic island with mancheswar which is the major way to reach the temple.

Being situated on an island, the temple can be reached by boats leaving from ferries in or near Cuttack. There is also a foot bridge which devotees or visitors can use on paying a nominal fee. People from the nearby villages have set up a number of shops leading to the bridge and the temple's entrance.

== Attractions ==
- A big fair is held on the shukla paksha chaturdashi of the month Kartika called Bada-osha
- Shivaratri
- Various functions like Shivaratri, Pausha purnima, Dola purnima, and Kartika purnima are celebrated here
