= Babaji Rajah Bhonsle Chattrapathi =

(born 1957)

Shivaji Rajah Bhonsle Chattrapathi (born 1957) is the current head of the Maratha royal family of Thanjavur and the titular king of Thanjavur.
