= Satbir Singh (politician) =

Mayor of Delhi
- In office 2005–2006

President Delhi Pradesh Congress Seva Dal
- In office 1998–2001

President NSUI Delhi Unit
- In office 1978–1981

Municipal Councillor Mehrauli
- In office 1997–2012

Personal details
- Born: 15 August 1954 (age 72) Mehrauli, Delhi, India
- Party: Indian National Congress
- Spouse: Pushpa Singh
- Children: 1 Daughter, 1 Son
- Education: B.A. Hons (Economics)
- Alma mater: University of Delhi
- Website: satbirsingh.in

Satbir Singh was a former mayor of Delhi and is affiliated to the Indian National Congress. Born and brought up in Mehrauli, he had previously served as the Municipal Councillor of Mehrauli constituency for three consecutive terms.

Singh stood unsuccessfully as an Indian National Congress candidate for the Mehrauli constituency in the 2015 Delhi Assembly elections.

== Early life and education ==
Satbir Singh was born to Nandlal and Sarti Devi on 15 August 1954 in Mehrauli, Delhi. His family were farmers. He completed his schooling in Mehrauli and went on to pursue B.A. (Hons.) Economics at Delhi University.

== Political career ==
=== With the NSUI ===
While pursuing his degree studies, Singh became involved with National Student's Union of India, the student wing of the Indian National Congress and went on to become the President of NSUI Delhi Unit for three consecutive years from 1978.

While heading the NSUI, he took up the cause of Women Safety and was successful in getting a record increase in the number of U-Specials for girl students of Delhi University. He also became directly involved in various developmental works in Mehrauli.

=== As an Elected representative ===
Singh fought his first election for the Municipal Corporation of Delhi as an Indian National Congress Candidate from Mehrauli constituency and won with a margin of over 6000 votes. There started his political innings as an elected representative. He went on to serve the Mehrauli and its residents as their representative in the Municipal Corporation for fifteen consecutive years (from 1997 to 2012). He is known to be so involved with the area that even when he was chosen as Mayor he refused to accept the Mayor house and continued to live in Mehrauli.

During these three tenures as the Municipal Councillor, Satbir Singh held various positions of responsibility- Chairman of MCD South Zone(1997-1998, 2001-2002), Chairman of MCD Education Committee (2002-2003), Leader of the House in MCD (2003-2005) and most notably, Mayor of Delhi (2005-2006).

==== Achievements as Mayor of Delhi ====
Among the measures undertaken during Singh's 2005-2006 mayoralty were:

- Property Tax Exemption was granted on residential buildings in all Villages of Delhi
- Computerisation of Toll Tax Plazas across Delhi was accomplished and many computerised toll plazas were unveiled, including the first computerized toll plaza at Mandavli
- With an objective of increasing access to education, a single window clearance system was established under which a record number of schools were passed- hundreds of MCD schools were newly constructed and for many of the existing schools, a complete infrastructure revamp was undertaken
- With an aim of providing effective, efficient and transparent governance- an Online Portal of MCD was launched for registration of births/deaths
- Keeping in mind public welfare, Singh opposed the demolition/sealing drive in Delhi. He petitioned the High Court to provide relief to people being affected by the drive. Satbir Singh fought hard for proper rehabilitation of the streetvendors, shopkeepers and traders getting displaced and appealed for creation of Special Shopping Centers for them. He also appealed and fought for the cause of regularization of commercial units in residential areas with 80 ft roads and wider. Spearheading the struggle for Mixed Land Use, he was largely successful in getting adequate measures incorporated and implemented as part of the Delhi Master Plan 2021

=== Seva Dal ===
Satbir Singh headed the Delhi Pradesh Congress Seva Dal from 1998 to 2001. Founded by Jawaharlal Nehru in 1924, Seva Dal is the grassroots front organisation of the Indian National Congress.

=== Delhi Assembly Elections 2015 ===
Satbir Singh stood unsuccessfully as the Congress candidate for Mehrauli Assembly constituency in the 2015 Delhi Assembly elections.

== Personal life ==
Satbir Singh is married to Pushpa Singh and they have two children. Pushpa Singh is a social worker involved with various NGOs and is presently the Municipal Councillor from Mehrauli ward in the South Delhi Municipal Corporation.
