= Tengku Muhammad Shawal bin Tengku Abdul Aziz =

Tengku Muhammad Shawal: تڠكو محمد شوال
- Yang Amat Mulia

Representative of the Sultan Hussein lineage
- Period: 31 October 1996 – present
- Born: 21 December 1968 (age 57); Istana Kampong Glam, Singapore
- Spouse: Cik Saadah binti Haji Othman (m. 1991)
- Issue: Tengku Bahrullah; Tengku Zakiyah
- House: House of Bendahara (Johor branch)
- Father: Tengku Abdul Aziz bin Tengku Husin
- Mother: Tengku Hajjah Fatima Munira Hanim binti Tengku Abdul Aziz
- Religion: Sunni Islam

Tengku Muhammad Shawal bin Tengku Abdul Aziz is a Singaporean descendant of the royal house of Johor. As a fourth-great-grandson of Sultan Hussein Shah, he belongs to the historical House of Bendahara lineage that governed the old Johor–Riau–Lingga Sultanate prior to the 19th-century shift in power when his family was usurped by the House of Temenggong.

Following the 1855 treaty that transferred administrative sovereignty to the House of Temenggong with British support, his branch of the family became established in Singapore, historically centered around the Istana Kampong Glam. In contemporary times, he is frequently cited by historians and family networks as a prominent custodian of the displaced royal lineage, actively engaged in preserving the historical heritage of the pre-19th century Johor Sultanate.

== Personal life ==
He was married at Istana Kampong Glam in Singapore on 1 November 1991 to Cik Saadah binti Haji Othman. He has a son, Tengku Bahrullah bin Tengku Mohamad, and a daughter, Tengku Zakiyah binti Tengku Mohamad.
