= Athgarh State =

Princely State in Odisha, India

Coordinates: 20.53°N 85.62°E

- Princely State of British India
- 1178–1948
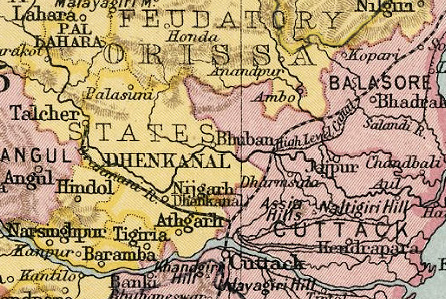
- Atgarh State in the Imperial Gazetteer of India
- Area
  - 1931: 435.12 km^{2} (168.00 sq mi)
- Population
  - 1931: 42,351
- History
  - Established: 1178
  - Accession to the Union of India: 1948
Succeeded by
India

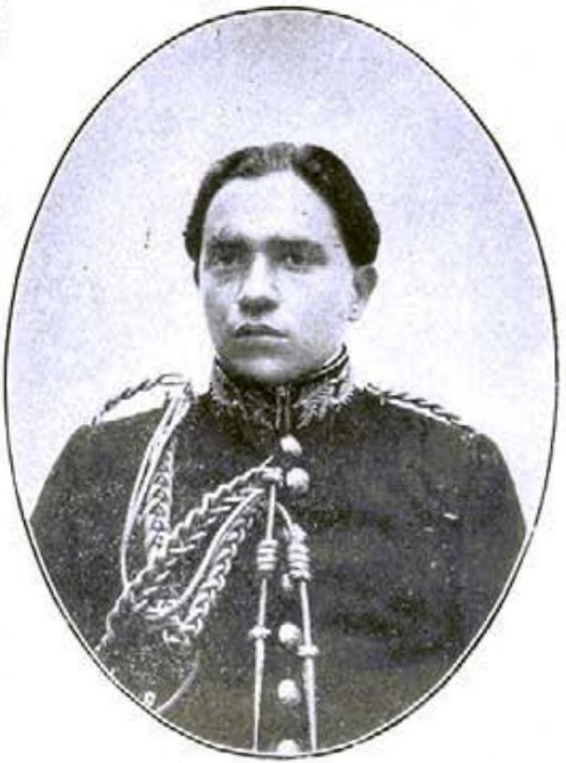
Raja Radhanath Deb Burman Patnaik of Athgarh from Oriya Bhasha Kosh 1931

Portrait of Raja Srikaran Radhanath Beberta Patnaik from the 1937 book “His Imperial Majesty King George V and the Princes of India and the Indian Empire”.

Athgarh was one of the princely states of India during the period of the British Raj. The state was founded by Raja Srikaran Niladri Bebarta Patnaik in 1178 and had its capital in Athgarh (Athagad) town. It was made part of Cuttack district after its merger into the state of Odisha in 1948. The emblem of the state was Radha Krishna. The state encompassed 192 villages. Other accounts mention that Athgarh encompassed 211 villages. Athgarh holds a rich architectural legacy, notably the 90-foot-tall Attali Jagannath temple established by Raja Srikaran Viswanath Patnaik. Athgarh was also home to the Dhabaleswar Temple dedicated to Lord Shiva which was repaired, renovated and maintained by the erstwhile rulers of Athgarh State. Both of the temples are now part of the Cuttack district. The Raghunatha Temple dedicated to Lord Rama, and the Radha Madhava Temple, dedicated to Lord Krishna and Goddess Radha, were also built by the rulers of the ex-princely state of Athgarh.

== History ==
The founder of the state was Raja SriKaran Niladri Bhagirath Barman Patnaik. He was the minister of the Raja of Puri, who conferred on him the title of Raja and gave him Athgarh for his services, or according to another account, as a dowry on marrying the Puri Raja's sister. The Rajguru of Athgarh lived near Gada (Rani Mahal). Athgarh is alleged to have originally extended on the east as far as Parganas Cuttack and Dalijora, on the west up to Tigria princely state, on the north from Kapilas to Gobindpur, Baldiaband, Nadiali, Krishnaprasad and Pachimeshwar temple and on the south to Banki, Dompara, Matri and Patia. Kakhari and Tapankhand were annexed by the Mughals. Parajan and Bajrakot were given as religious endowments. Raja of Dhenkanal who married the daughter of Raja of Athgarh obtained possession of most of the villages of Majkuri Bisa. There was a succession struggle in the ruling house of Athgarh after the death of Raja Bhagirathi Patnaik in the year 1893 between his brother Raghunath San Samanta and his illegitimate son Srinath Gambit Samanta. Raja Bhagirathi Patnaik had two younger brothers and an illegitimate son Srinath Gambit Samanta who was born of a “Phulbivahi” marriage union wherein the mother Annapurna was not the main queen and was considered a concubine of the royal household however Raja Bhagirathi Patnaik desired to make his illegitimate son Srinath Gambit Samanta the rightful heir to the throne at the time of his death due to his misunderstanding with his younger brothers Raghunath and Viswanath also due to the fact that his main wife (Patrani) was childless, this decision was challenged by his younger brother Raghunath San Samanta (Raghunath Patnaik) and the late Raja’s chief wife (Raja’s Patrani), Harichandan Mahapatra, an illegitimate brother of Raja Bhagirathi Patnaik reported to the Assistant Superintendent of Tributary Mahals that he had installed the Raja’s illegitimate son Srinath Gambit Samanta to the throne, this succession was challenged by the late Raja’s Patrani (main wife) and his younger brother. The British administration acknowledged that Raja Bhagirathi wanted to make his illegitimate son the successor however they decisioned in favour of Raja’s younger brother Raghunath Samanta’s claim as Srinath Gambit Samanta was the son of a “Phulbivahi” queen, as per law a younger brother of the main Raja is given preference for the throne over a “Phulbivahi” son. Raghunatha Samanta succeeded to the throne as Raja Srikaran Raghunath Patnaik. Rajas of Athgarh maintained a military force of around 341 soldiers or Paikas (state militia) and a police force of around 50 men, as restricted by the British government/administration, the Paikas were restricted to guard and escort duties for the chiefs or for appearance in occasions, their original numbers were greatly reduced, as per older traditions, Paikas of Athgarh were granted rent free lands in exchange for their services by the chiefs. The independence movement also witnessed a widespread agitation of the public against the Raja of Athgarh as Raja Radhanath Patnaik is said to have spent 10 percent of the total income of the state in purchasing motor cars and aeroplanes. Raja Radhanath had also stopped the sale of goods from his state to other states which harmed the economy of Athgarh, such events finally led to Praja Mandal movement in Athgarh. Raja Radhanath Patnaik had completed his education at Rajkumar College, Raipur, and ascended the throne (gaddi) of Athgarh at eight years of age as a minor after the death of his father Raja Viswanath Patnaik. Raja Radhanath Patnaik married the eldest daughter of the Raja of Hindol. During the British Raj, Athgarh was one of the Feudatory States of Orissa and acceded to India following the independence of India when the last ruler Raja Radhanath Bebarta Patnaik signed the accession to the Indian Union on 1 January 1948.

== Rulers ==
The rulers of Athagarh princely state:

- Raja Srikaran Niladri Bhagirath Barman Patnaik (1178–1218 CE)
- Raja Srikaran Dandapani Biwarta Patnaik (1218–1253)
- Raja Srikaran Jagannath Biwarta Patnaik I (1253–1283)
- ...
- Raja SriKaran Narayana Bebarta Patnaik (1681–1709)
- Raja SriKaran Rama Krishna Bebarta Patnaik (1709–1741)
- Raja SriKaran Debia Singh Bebarta Patnaik (1741–1771)
- Raja SriKaran Gopinath Bebarta Patnaik (1771–1821)
- Raja SriKaran Krishna Chandra Bebarta Patnaik (1821–1825)
- Raja SriKaran Rama Chandra Bebarta Patnaik (1825–1837)
- Raja SriKaran Bhubaneswar Bebarta Patnaik (1837–1862)
- Raja SriKaran Jagannath Bebarta Patnaik II (1862–1869)
- Raja SriKaran Bhagirathi Bebarta Patnaik (1869–1893)
- Raja SriKaran Raghunath Bebarta Patnaik (1893 – 25 Jan 1896)
- Raja SriKaran Vishwanath Bebarta Patnaik Bahadur (25 Jan 1896 – 22 Jun 1918)
- Raja SriKaran Radhanath Bebarta Patnaik (22 Jun 1918 – 1 January 1948)

=== Titular ===
- Raja SriKaran Radhanath Bebarta Patnaik (1 January 1948 – 23 Aug 1983)
- Raja SriKaran Sankar Prasad Bebarta Patnaik (23 Aug 1983 – 30 Jan 1990)
- Raja SriKaran Subhrapada Bebarta Patnaik (30 Jan 1990 – present)

== See also ==
- Eastern States Agency
- Political integration of India
