= Prince Ernst August of Lippe =

German prince (1917–1990)

Prince Ernst August
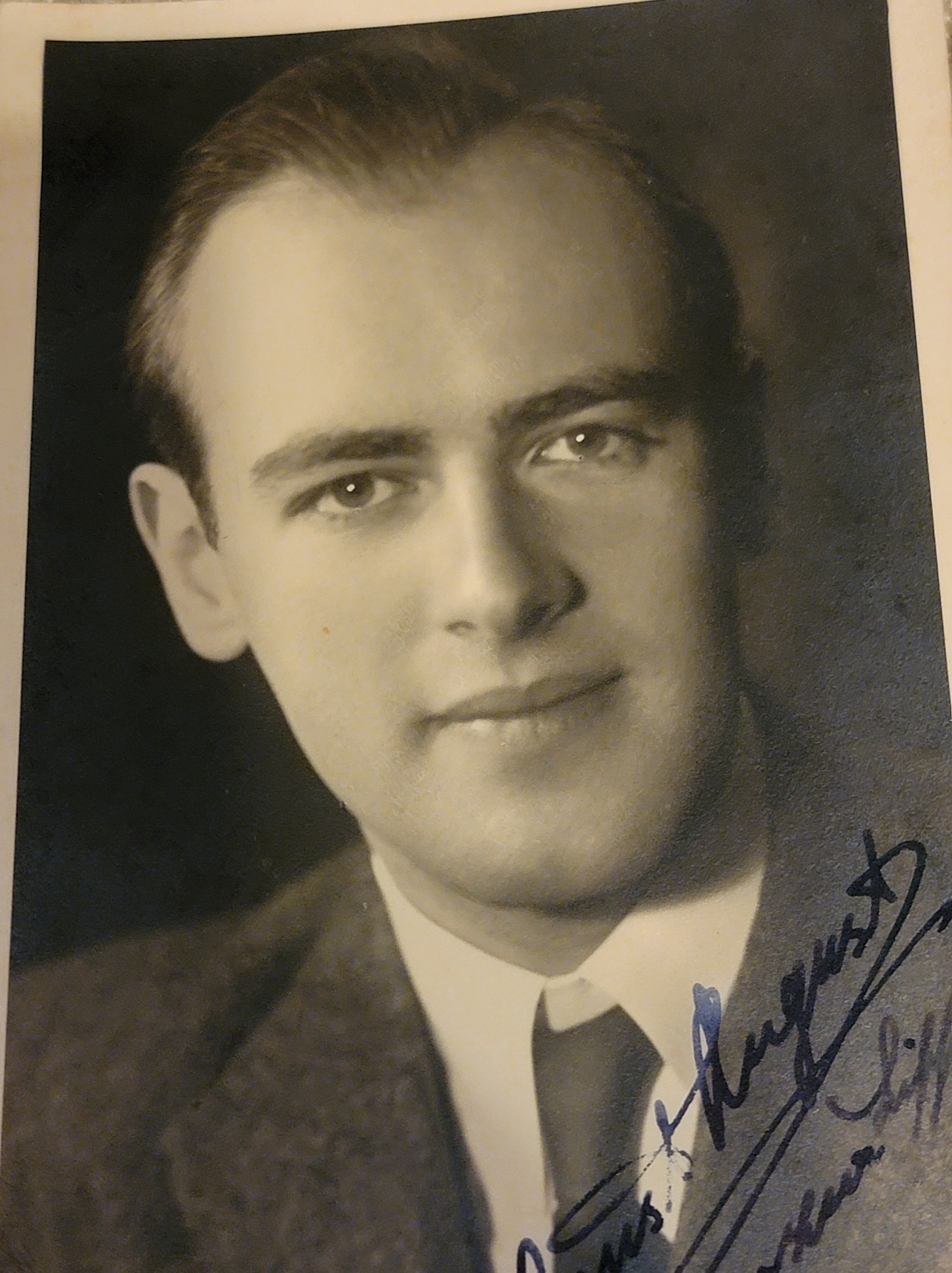
- Ernst August in 1946
- Born: 1 April 1917; Dresden, Kingdom of Saxony
- Died: 15 June 1990 (aged 73); Ansbach, West Germany
- Spouse: Christa von Arnim (m. 1948)
- Issue: Prince Friedrich Wilhelm; Princess Marie; Prince Ernst August; Princess Regina
- House: Lippe
- Father: Prince Julius Ernst of Lippe
- Mother: Duchess Marie of Mecklenburg-Strelitz

Prince Ernst August of Lippe (German: Prinz Ernst August Bernhard Alexander Eduard Friedrich Wilhelm zur Lippe; 1 April 1917 – 15 June 1990) was a claimant to the headship of the House of Lippe. Between 1950 and 1954 he was the president of the Vespa Club of Germany (VCVD).

== Early life ==
Prince Ernst August was born at Dresden, Kingdom of Saxony, the second child and first son of Prince Julius Ernst of Lippe (1873–1952; son of Ernst, Count of Lippe-Biesterfeld and Countess Caroline von Wartensleben) and his wife, Duchess Marie of Mecklenburg-Strelitz (1878–1948; daughter of Adolphus Frederick V, Grand Duke of Mecklenburg-Strelitz and his wife Princess Elisabeth of Anhalt). Through his father he was first cousin of Prince Bernhard, consort to Queen Juliana of the Netherlands, and was a guest at their 1937 wedding. Through his mother he was descendant of George III of the United Kingdom.

He had three half siblings; his mother had been married previously to Count George Jametel but divorced in 1908. His mother had also given birth to an illegitimate daughter in 1898.

== Marriage ==
Ernst August married on 3 March 1948 in Oberkassel, Bonn to Christa von Arnim (b. 2 July 1923-20 February 2020), elder daughter of Curt David von Arnim, and his wife, Stephanie von Stechow.

They had four children:

- Prince Friedrich Wilhelm of Lippe (b. 7 September 1947) married in 1991 to Andrea Messner, had issue (three daughters).
- Princess Marie of Lippe (b. 26 August 1949) married in 1971 to Nikolaus von Itzenplitz, had issue.
- Prince Ernst August of Lippe (b. 24 December 1952) married in 1981 to Countess Maria Benedicta Johanna Antonia Bernhardine Ludmila von Magnis, had issue (one daughter), and married second in 2006 to Gerlinde Inge Möltner, no issue.
- Princess Regina of Lippe (b. 13 December 1959) married in 1983 to Peter Clemens Jacubowsky, had issue.

== House of Lippe ==
On 30 December 1949 his younger half-brother Prince Armin succeeded his father Leopold IV as head of the House of Lippe. On 22 March 1953, he renounced his position in favour of his older half brother Prince Leopold. This move proved controversial within the house and several princes began legal proceedings. Prince Leopold later in 1958 renounced the headship in favour of his older brother Hereditary Prince Ernst. Later that year the Hereditary Prince called a family council where it was agreed by the princes in attendance that the oldest prince living in Germany would be head of the house. So the position was taken by Prince Simon Casimir (1900–1980).

Prince Ernst August changed his mind, believing all princes of the house, not just those living in Germany, should be considered. He ultimately assumed the headship of the house. Ernst August died in 1990 and his son Prince Friedrich Wilhelm has continued his claim. Prince Armin, who said he did not think his decision in 1953 was irrevocable, also claimed to be head of the house until his death in 2015, with his son Stephan, Prince of Lippe continuing his claim.

Prince Ernst August grew up and lived at Lippesches Palais in Oberkassel, Bonn, which had been home to the Lippe-Biesterfeld family for the past 209 years. In 1970 he also acquired Syburg castle at Bergen, Middle Franconia, which however he was forced to auction in 1977, followed by the sale of Lippe House in 1979.

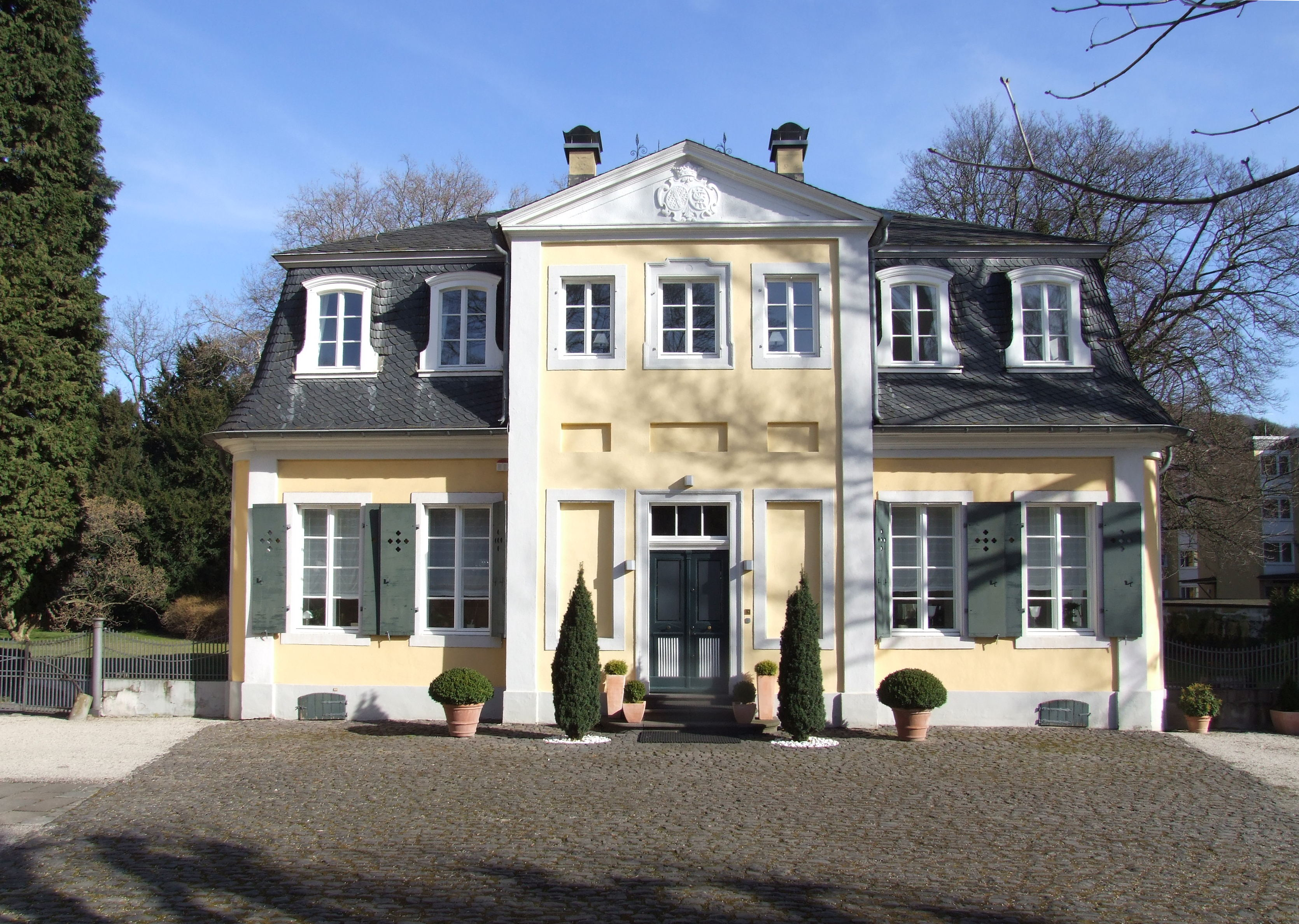
Lippe House at Oberkassel, Bonn

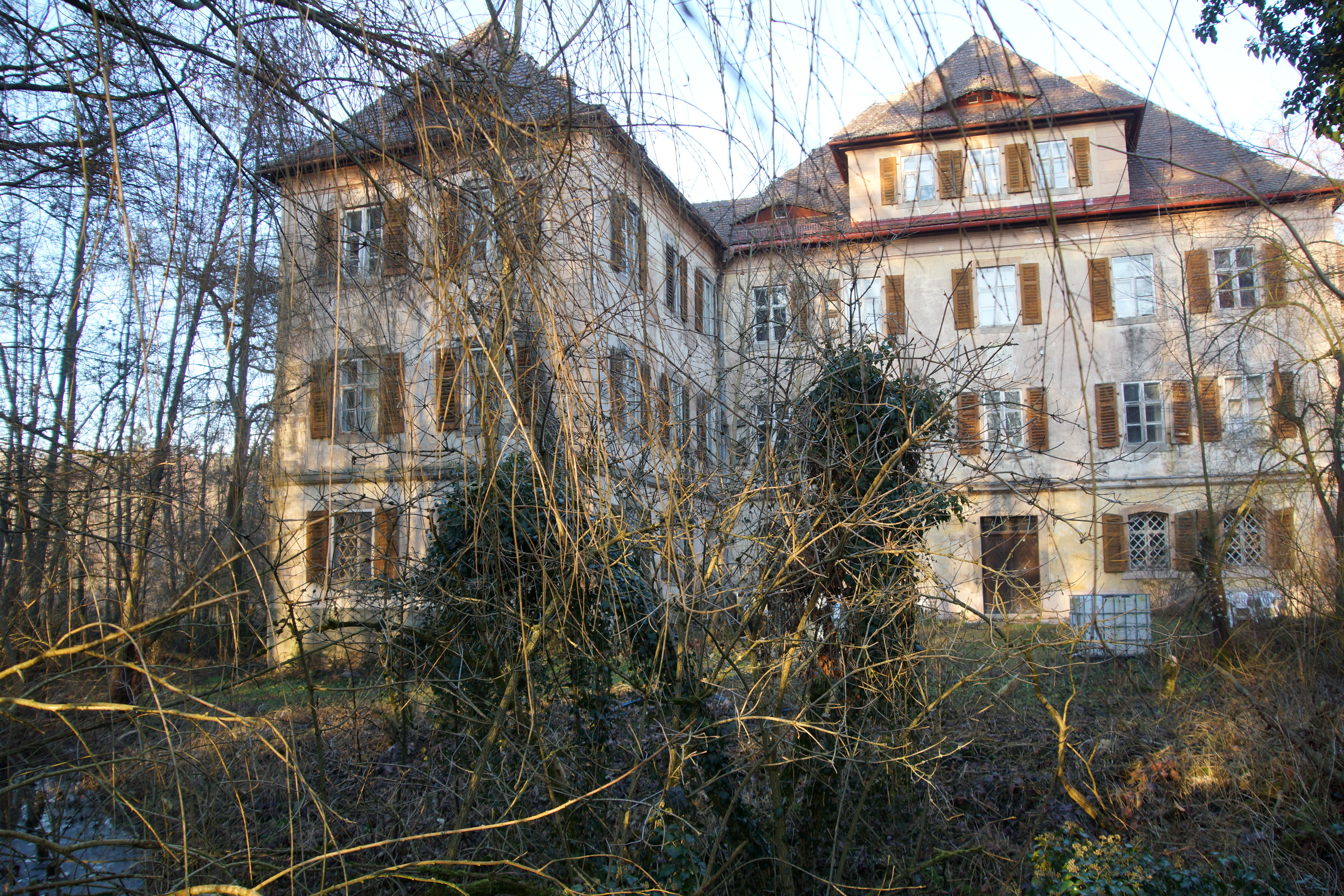
Syburg castle, Franconia

== Ancestry ==
Ancestors of Prince Ernst August of Lippe

8. Julius, Count of Lippe-Biesterfeld
4. Ernest, Count of Lippe-Biesterfeld
9. Countess Adelheid of Castell-Castell
2. Prince Julius Ernst of Lippe
10. Count Leopold of Wartensleben
5. Countess Caroline of Wartensleben
11. Mathilde Halbach
1. Prince Ernst August of Lippe
12. Frederick William, Grand Duke of Mecklenburg-Strelitz
6. Adolphus Frederick V, Grand Duke of Mecklenburg-Strelitz
13. Princess Augusta of Cambridge
3. Duchess Marie of Mecklenburg-Strelitz
14. Frederick I, Duke of Anhalt
7. Princess Elisabeth of Anhalt
15. Princess Antoinette of Saxe-Altenburg

== Notes and sources ==
- The Royal House of Stuart, London, 1969, 1971, 1976, Addington, A. C., Reference: II 401
- Genealogisches Handbuch des Adels, Fürstliche Häuser, Reference: 1997 52
- Beéche, Arturo E. (October 2006). "A Headless House? The Dynastic Dispute of the House of Lippe". European Royal History Journal (LIII): 13–17.
- Präsidiumsgeschichte des Vespa Club von Deutschland
