= Prince Friedrich Wilhelm of Lippe =

German prince (born 1947)

Prince Friedrich Wilhelm
- Born: 7 September 1947 (age 79); Neuwied, Allied-occupied Germany
- Spouse: Andrea Messner (m. 1991)
- Issue: 3
Names
- German: Friedrich Wilhelm Ernst Viktor Alexander
- House: Lippe
- Father: Prince Ernst August of Lippe
- Mother: Christa von Arnim

Friedrich Wilhelm of Lippe (German: Friedrich Wilhelm Ernst Viktor Alexander Prinz zur Lippe; born 7 September 1947) is a claimant to the headship of the House of Lippe.

== Early life ==
Friedrich Wilhelm was born out of wedlock at Neuwied, West Germany, the first child of Prince Ernst August of Lippe (1917–1990; son of Prince Julius Ernst of Lippe and Duchess Marie of Mecklenburg-Strelitz) and his wife, Christa von Arnim (b. 1923; daughter of Curt David von Arnim and his wife, Stephanie von Stechow). Through his father he is second cousin of Princess Beatrix of the Netherlands.

== Marriage ==
Friedrich Wilhelm married on 18 September 1991 in Munich to Andrea Messner (b. 1966), daughter of Günther Messner, and his wife, Lieselotte Trzoska.

They had three daughters.

== House of Lippe ==
On 30 December 1949 his father's first cousin Prince Armin succeeded his father, Leopold IV as head of the House of Lippe. On 22 March 1953, he renounced his position in favour of his older half-brother, Prince Leopold. This move proved controversial within the house and several princes started legal proceedings. Prince Leopold later in 1958 renounced the headship in favour of his older brother, Hereditary Prince Ernst. Later in that year the Hereditary Prince called a family council where it was agreed by the princes in attendance that the oldest prince living in Germany would be head of the house. Therefore, the position went to Prince Simon Casimir (1900–1980).

His father changed his mind, believing all princes of the house, not just those living in Germany, should be considered. He ultimately assumed the headship of the house. His father died in 1990 and Friedrich Wilhelm continued the claim, despite his illegitimate birth. Prince Armin, who has said he did not think his decision in 1953 was irrevocable, also claimed to be head of the house until his death in 2015, with his son Stephan, Prince of Lippe continuing his claim.

== Notes and sources ==
- Genealogisches Handbuch des Adels, Fürstliche Häuser, Reference: 1987 65
- Beéche, Arturo E. (October 2006). "A Headless House? The Dynastic Dispute of the House of Lippe". European Royal History Journal (LIII): 13–17.
