= Duchess Jutta of Mecklenburg-Strelitz =

Militza
- Crown Princess of Montenegro
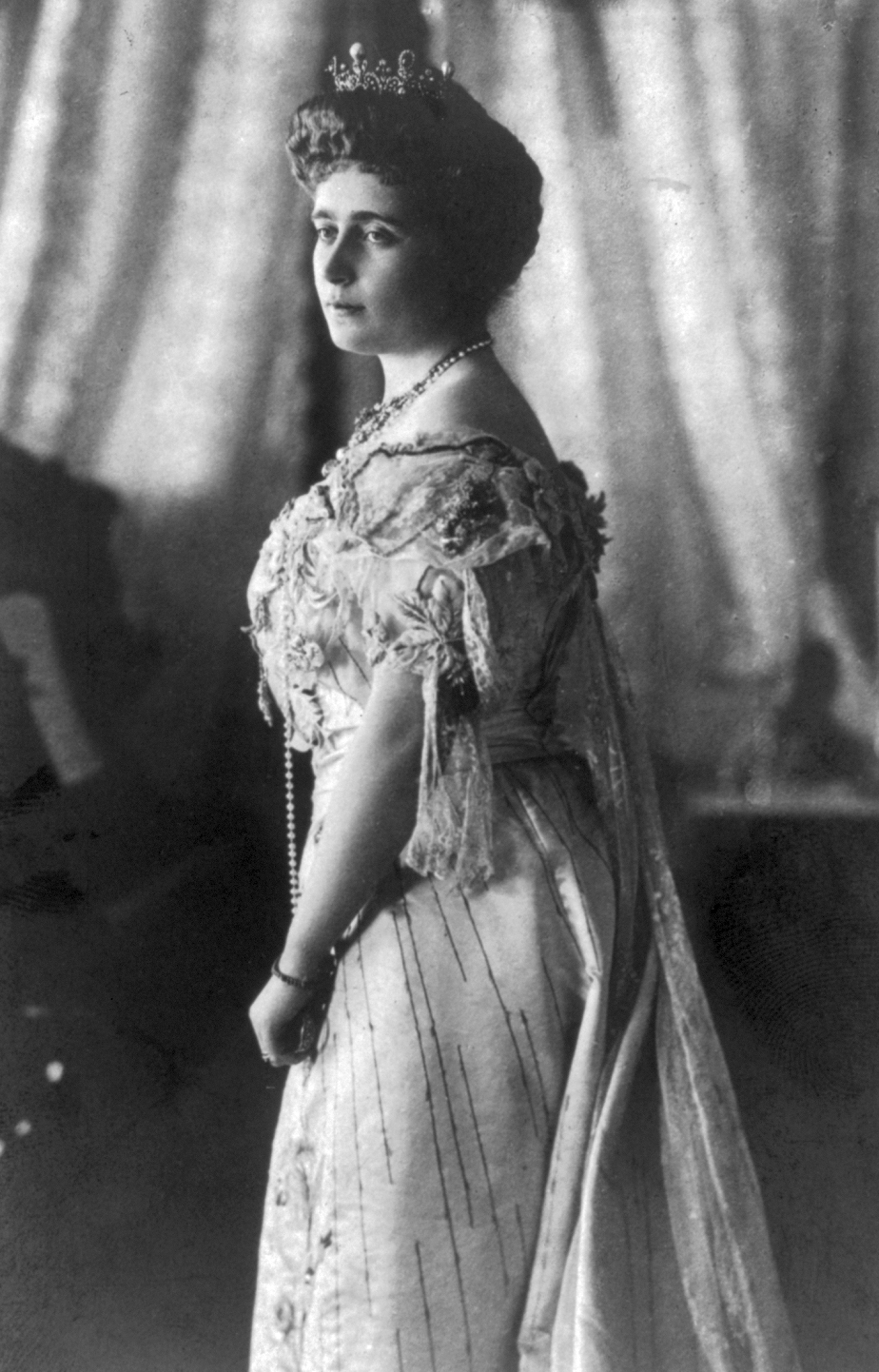
- The Crown Princess in 1900
- Born: 24 January 1880; Neustrelitz, Mecklenburg-Strelitz, German Empire
- Died: 17 February 1946 (aged 66); Rome, Kingdom of Italy
- Burial: Protestant Cemetery, Rome
- Spouse: Danilo, Crown Prince of Montenegro (m. 1899; died 1939)
Names
- German: Auguste Charlotte Jutta Alexandra Georgine Adolfine
- House: Mecklenburg-Strelitz (by birth); Petrović-Njegoš (by marriage)
- Father: Adolphus Frederick V, Grand Duke of Mecklenburg-Strelitz
- Mother: Princess Elisabeth of Anhalt
- Religion: Serbian Orthodox prev. Lutheranism

Duchess Jutta of Mecklenburg-Strelitz (Augusta Charlotte Jutta Alexandra Georgina Adophine; 24 January 1880 – 17 February 1946) was a member of the House of Mecklenburg-Strelitz and the consort of Crown Prince Danilo of Montenegro. When a married woman, after being converted to the Orthodox faith, she was known as Militza.

== Early life and marriage ==
Duchess Auguste Charlotte Jutta Alexandra Georgina Adolphine of Mecklenburg-Strelitz was born in Neustrelitz, the youngest daughter of the then Hereditary Grand Duke of Mecklenburg-Strelitz, Adolf Friedrich and his wife Princess Elisabeth of Anhalt.Along with her sister Marie, Jutta was raised by governesses and had little contact with her parents. The atmosphere of Carolinenpalais was noted for its rigor and need for etiquette. A scandal broke out when her 19-year-old sister became pregnant by a palace servant.

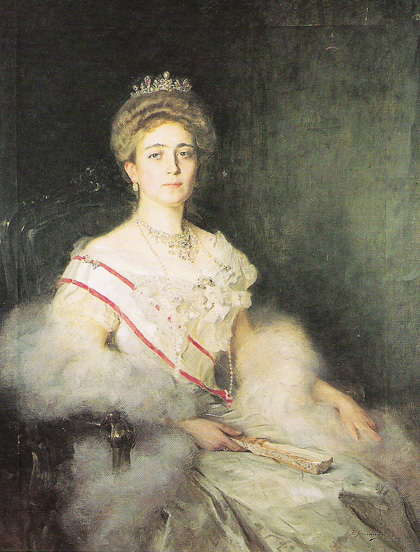
Portrait of Crown Princess Militza by Paja Jovanović

Through the influence of the German Emperor, William II, her marriage to the heir apparent of Montenegro Prince Danilo was arranged. Hours after her arrival at Antivari in Montenegro she converted to the Orthodox faith. She was accompanied by her future brother in law the Crown Prince of Italy, Victor Emmanuel as she made her way to Cetinje for her wedding. She married Prince Danilo on 27 July 1899. After her marriage and conversion to Orthodoxy she took the name Militza.

== World War I and later life ==
During the First World War, Montenegro fought against the Central Powers which included the country of her birth, the German Empire. These links did not stop her from being a target; the villa in Antivari where she was staying was bombed by Austrian aircraft. After the war, the Royal Family established a government in exile after Montenegro was incorporated into the new Kingdom of Serbs, Croats and Slovenes. Her father-in-law King Nicholas I died on 1 March 1921 and her husband succeeded as titular King of Montenegro. He only held the position for a week before abdicating in favour of his nephew Michael.

Jutta spent the rest of her life in exile. She and her husband lived in France. Danilo died in Vienna in 1939. Jutta died in Rome where her brother-in-law King Victor Emmanuel III reigned.

== Ancestors ==
Ancestors of Duchess Jutta of Mecklenburg-Strelitz

8. George, Grand Duke of Mecklenburg-Strelitz
4. Frederick William, Grand Duke of Mecklenburg-Strelitz
9. Princess Marie of Hesse-Kassel
2. Adolphus Frederick V, Grand Duke of Mecklenburg-Strelitz
10. Prince Adolphus, Duke of Cambridge
5. Princess Augusta of Cambridge
11. Princess Augusta of Hesse-Kassel
1. Duchess Jutta of Mecklenburg-Strelitz
12. Leopold IV, Duke of Anhalt
6. Frederick I, Duke of Anhalt
13. Princess Frederica of Prussia
3. Princess Elisabeth of Anhalt
14. Prince Eduard of Saxe-Altenburg
7. Princess Antoinette of Saxe-Altenburg
15. Princess Amalie of Hohenzollern-Sigmaringen

== Sources ==
- Pope-Hennessy, James (1959). Queen Mary 1867-1953. London: George Allen and Unwin Unlimited. ISBN 0-04-923025-5.
