= Traute, Princess of Lippe =

German princess (1925–2023)

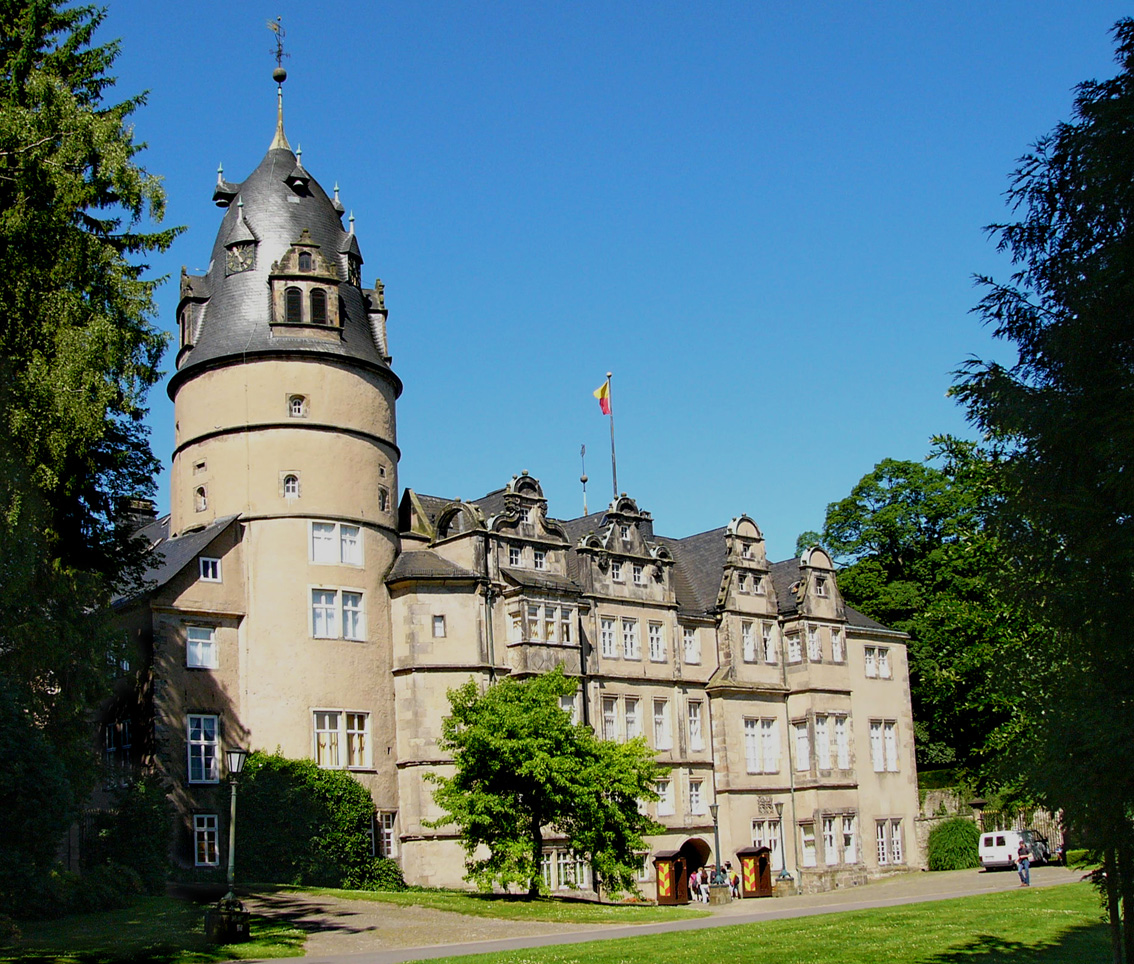
- Detmold Castle (2005)
- Born: Traute Becker; 19 February 1925; Hänigsen, Lower Saxony, German Reich
- Died: 25 February 2023 (aged 98); Detmold, North Rhine–Westphalia, Germany
- Spouse(s): Armin, Prince of Lippe (m. 1953; died 2015)
- Children: Stephan, Prince of Lippe
- Parents: Gustave Becker (father); Charlotte Meyer (mother)

Traute, Princess of Lippe (German: Traute Prinzessin zur Lippe [ˈtʁaʊ̯tə pʁɪnˈt͜sɛsɪn t͜sʊʁ ˈlɪpə]; born Traute Becker, 16 February 1925 – 25 February 2023) was a German princess, philanthropist, and biologist. She was a patron of the visual arts, the Princess Pauline Foundation, the City of Detmold, and the District of Lippe. She was the bearer of the Federal Cross of Merit. She was awarded a Crown Cross in gold from the Diakonisches Werk in recognition of her social work.

== Biography ==
Born in Hänigsen, Uetze, Lower Saxony, Traute was the daughter of Charlotte Meyer and Gustave Becker. She earned a doctorate in biology. Traute married Armin, Prince of Lippe, in Göttingen, where they first met, on 27 March 1953. He was head of the House of Lippe.

In 1959, Traute gave birth to their son Stephan, Prince of Lippe. She was regularly seen walking around Detmold with Prince Armin and their Scottish Terrier dog until Armin died in 2015. They were married for 62 years, and had five grandchildren.

Princess Traute of Lippe was a board member of the Princess Pauline Foundation from 1979 to 2000 and served as chairman from 1983 to 1995. She was a founding member of the Lippische Gesellschaft für Kunst, along with Prince Armin, and served as its honorary chairman from 2016. In 2015, she also took over patronage of the MS-Kontaktkreis, a multiple sclerosis support group, following the death of Prince Armin and hosted its annual visit to Detmold Castle.

Princess Traute died at Detmold Castle on 25 February 2023, at the age of 98.

== Publications ==
- Traute Prinzessin zur Lippe (1991). "Zur Geschichte der Paulinen Anstalt". Heimatland Lippe (in German). 3 (81–89).
