= Duchess of Mecklenburgh Strelitz's Annuity Act 1843 =

Act of the Parliament of the United Kingdom

- Act of Parliament
- Parliament of the United Kingdom
- Long title: An Act to enable Her Majesty to settle all Annuity on Her Royal Highness the Princess Augusta Caroline, eldest Daughter of His Royal Highness the Duke of Cambridge.
- Citation: 6 & 7 Vict. c. 25
- Territorial extent: United Kingdom

Dates
- Royal assent: 27 June 1843
- Commencement: 27 June 1843 (Note: The Acts of Parliament (Commencement) Act 1793.)
- Repealed: 18 December 1953
Other legislation
Repealed by	Statute Law Revision Act 1953

Status: Repealed

Text of statute as originally enacted

The Duchess of Mecklenburgh Strelitz's Annuity Act 1843 (6 & 7 Vict. c. 25), or the Annuity, Duchess of Mecklenburgh Strelitz Act 1843 or Princess Augusta's Annuity Act 1843, was an act of the Parliament of the United Kingdom.

In recognition of royal consent having been given to marriage between Princess Augusta of Cambridge and Frederick William, Hereditary Grand Duke of Mecklenburgh Strelitz, the act provided for the grant of an annuity of £3,000 per annum, payable quarterly from the death of her father, Prince Adolphus, Duke of Cambridge, which occurred in 1850, until the death of the princess (which occurred in 1916).

The annuity was suspended in 1914 following the outbreak of World War I.

== Subsequent developments ==
The whole act was repealed by section 1 of, and the first schedule to, the Statute Law Revision Act 1953 (2 & 3 Eliz. 2. c. 5), which came into force on 18 December 1953.
