= Duchess Marie of Mecklenburg =

Duchess Marie
- Countess George Jametel; Princess Julius Ernst of Lippe
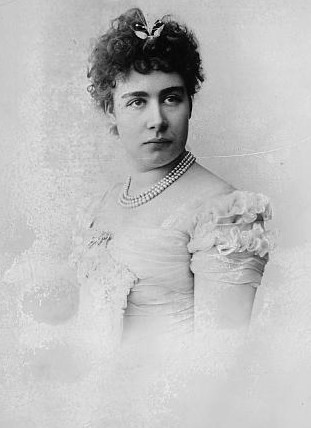
- Born: 8 May 1878; Neustrelitz, German Empire
- Died: 14 October 1948 (aged 70); Oberkassel, Allied-occupied Germany
- Spouse: Count George Jametel (m. 1899; div. 1908) Prince Julius Ernst of Lippe (m. 1914)
- Issue: Count George Jametel; Countess Marie Jametel; Princess Elisabeth of Lippe; Prince Ernst August of Lippe
Names
- German: Victoria Marie Auguste Luise Antoinette Karoline Leopoldine
- House: Mecklenburg-Strelitz
- Father: Adolphus Frederick V, Grand Duke of Mecklenburg-Strelitz
- Mother: Elisabeth of Anhalt

Marie's brother Karl Borwin, killed by Count Jametel while defending his sister's honour

Duchess Marie of Mecklenburg-Strelitz (Victoria Marie Auguste Luise Antoinette Karoline Leopoldine; 8 May 1878 – 14 October 1948) was the eldest daughter of Adolf Friedrich V, Grand Duke of Mecklenburg-Strelitz and his wife Princess Elisabeth of Anhalt.

== Early life ==
Duchess Marie of Mecklenburg-Strelitz was born on 8 May 1878 in Neustrelitz. She was the eldest child and daughter of Adolphus Frederick V, Grand Duke of Mecklenburg-Strelitz, and Princess Elisabeth of Anhalt. Nearly a month after her birth, Duchess Marie was christened into the Lutheran church on 2 June at the Carolinenpalais in Neustrelitz. She was given the names Victoria Marie Auguste Luise Antoinette Karoline Leopoldine.

During her childhood, Marie and her younger sister Jutta were looked after by a handful governesses. Their parents rarely saw them.

As a young woman of 19, Marie became pregnant by a palace servant in 1897. The servant, a married man named Heinrich Hecht, was responsible for turning off the gas-lights in the bedrooms of the grand ducal children. Several of Marie's cousins, including the future King George V of the United Kingdom and William II, German Emperor, thought that Marie had been "hypnotised", while Queen Victoria of the United Kingdom thought that Marie "must have been drugged". Hecht was dismissed from service on the charge of stealing; his subsequent lawsuit against the grand ducal family made the details of the story public. The story made radical newspaper headlines in its day.

A daughter was born to Marie in 1898; she was raised under the protection of Marie's grandmother Augusta, Grand Duchess of Mecklenburg-Strelitz.

== First marriage ==
Marie went to France, where she met Count George Jametel (1859–1944), the son of Ernest Jametel, a banker and patent medicine manufacturer, and nephew of the politician Count Gustave-Louis Jametel; he had received the Papal title of Count from Pope Leo XIII in 1886. The acquaintance proceeded at a brisk pace, and Marie and George were married on 22 June 1899, only one year after the birth of Marie's illegitimate child, at the insistence of her paternal grandmother Grand Duchess Augusta Caroline of Mecklenburg-Strelitz. The wedding was held at the Catholic Chapel of St. Elizabeth in Richmond Park, London, near White Lodge, the home of Marie's late great-aunt the Duchess of Teck. A second, Anglican wedding ceremony was held the same day at the Parish Church of Kew. Even though the marriage was morganatic, many members of Marie's family attended the wedding, including her grandparents, parents, and three siblings. The wedding breakfast was given by her great-uncle the Duke of Cambridge at Cambridge Cottage, Kew.

Marie and George received a large financial settlement ($200,000) from Marie's father. They lived in the Faubourg St. Germain in Paris. They had two children:

- Count George Jametel (3 February 1904 – 1982), married Lise Barbet.
- Countess Marie Auguste Jametel (11 September 1905 – 24 September 1969), since 1910 Countess Nemerow; married Karl von Barton gen. von Stedman.

Marie's husband George had several affairs, most notoriously with the married Infanta Eulalia of Spain, daughter of Isabella II of Spain. In January 1908, Marie applied for a divorce from George. She accused the Count of having married her for her money, and of having continued his affair with Infanta Eulalia. When the matter went to court, Marie's own scandalous past, as the unwed mother of a manservant's child, was revealed and thrown in her face; as a result, Marie's family suffered much public disgrace. In August the same year, while the case was still proceeding in court, Marie's youngest brother, the nineteen-year-old Duke Karl Borwin of Mecklenburg, felt moved to challenge his brother-in-law to a duel, supposedly in defence of Marie's honour. The duel took place, and it was Borwin who was killed. Marie and George were divorced 31 December 1908. During the divorce, custody of the son George was initially granted to the father and the daughter Marie Auguste to the mother. However, it was later agreed that the son would divide his time equally between both parents. Having lost her fortune due to the divorce, Marie resumed the use of her Mecklenburg title and lived in the Blasewitz section of Dresden.

== Second marriage ==
On 11 August 1914, at Neustrelitz, Marie married equally Prince Julius Ernst of Lippe (1873–1952), third son of Count Ernst of Lippe-Biesterfeld, regent of Lippe, younger brother of Leopold IV, Prince of Lippe and uncle of Prince Bernhard of the Netherlands.

After their marriage Marie and Julius lived in Blasewitz and they later moved to Lippesches Palais in Oberkassel near Bonn. They had two children:

- Princess Elisabeth of Lippe (23 January 1916 – 16 May 2013); married Prince Ernst-August of Solms-Braunfels (1892–1968).
- Prince Ernst August of Lippe (1 April 1917 – 15 June 1990); married Christa von Arnim (1923–2020); he was also a claimant to the headship of the House of Lippe.

== Death ==
Duchess Marie died 14 October 1948 in Oberkassel, near Bonn, aged 70. She is buried beside her second husband in the Mausoleum am Büchenberg in Detmold, which is a Lippe family mausoleum.

== Sources ==
- Pope-Hennessy, James (1959). Queen Mary 1867-1953. London: George Allen and Unwin Unlimited. ISBN 0-04-923025-5.
