= Princess Elisabeth of Anhalt =

Grand Duchess of Mecklenburg-Strelitz from 1904 to 1914

Elisabeth of Anhalt
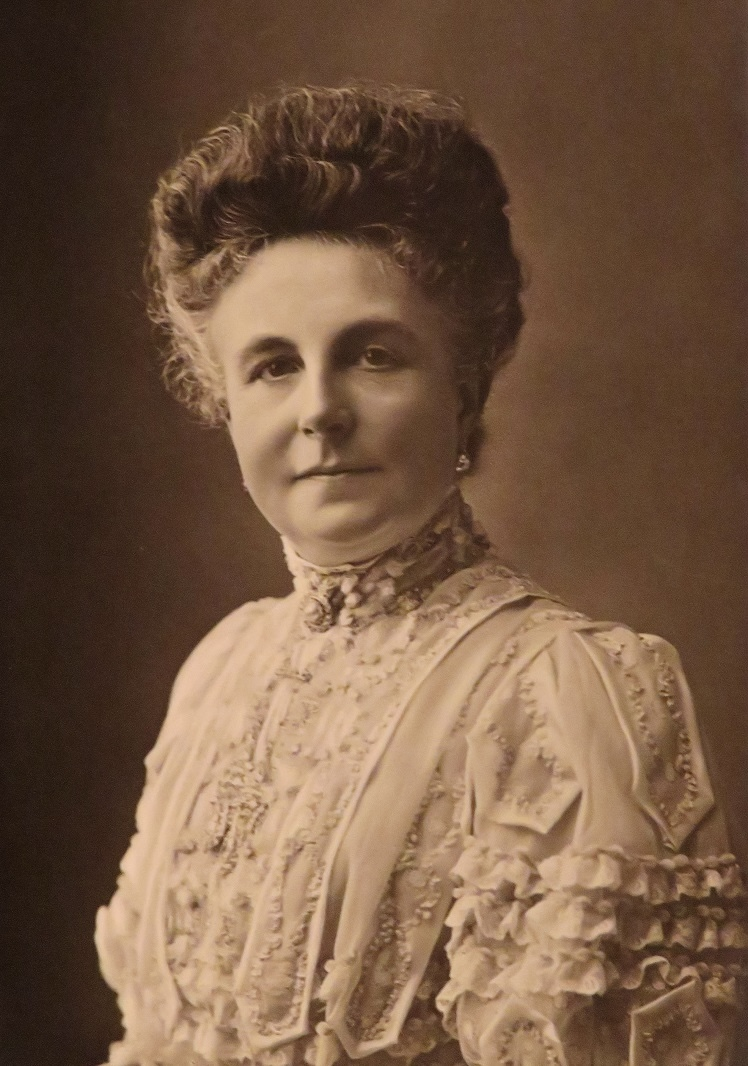

Grand Duchess consort of Mecklenburg-Strelitz
- Tenure: 30 May 1904 – 11 June 1914
- Born: 7 September 1857; Wörlitz, Anhalt-Dessau
- Died: 20 July 1933 (aged 75); Neustrelitz, Free State of Mecklenburg-Strelitz, Nazi Germany
- Burial: 25 July 1933; Mirow, Mecklenburg
- Spouse: Adolphus Frederick V, Grand Duke of Mecklenburg-Strelitz (m. 1877; died 1914)
- Issue: Marie, Princess Julius Ernst of Lippe; Jutta, Crown Princess of Montenegro; Adolphus Frederick VI, Grand Duke of Mecklenburg-Strelitz; Duke Karl Borwin
Names
- Elisabeth Marie Friederike Amelie Agnes
- House: Ascania
- Father: Frederick I, Duke of Anhalt
- Mother: Princess Antoinette of Saxe-Altenburg

Princess Elisabeth of Anhalt (7 September 1857 – 20 July 1933) was the Grand Duchess of Mecklenburg-Strelitz from 1904 to 1914 as the spouse of Adolf Friedrich V, Grand Duke of Mecklenburg-Strelitz.

== Early life and ancestry ==
She was born Princess Elisabeth Marie Frederica Amelia Agnes in Wörlitz, the third child of Friedrich I, Duke of Anhalt, and Princess Antoinette of Saxe-Altenburg. By birth, she was member of an ancient House of Anhalt, ruling family of the Duchy of Anhalt. Her nickname in the family was "Elly".

== Marriage ==
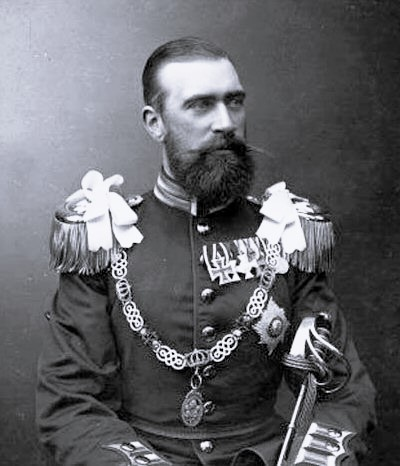
Princess Elisabeth's husband: Adolphus Frederick V

On 17 April 1877 Elisabeth became the Hereditary Grand Duchess of Mecklenburg-Strelitz when she married the then Hereditary Grand Duke, Adolf Friedrich, in Dessau.

Elisabeth and Adolf Friedrich had four children:

- Victoria Marie Auguste Luise Antoinette Karoline Leopoldine (8 May 1878 – 14 October 1948); married on 22 June 1899 to Count George Jametel (1859–1944). Divorced on 31 December 1908. Married secondly on 11 August 1914 to Prince Julius Ernst of Lippe (1873–1952), younger brother of Leopold IV of Lippe.
- Augusta Charlotte Jutta Alexandra Georgina Adophine (24 January 1880 – 17 February 1946); married on 27 July 1899 to Danilo, Crown Prince of Montenegro.
- Adolf Friedrich Georg Ernst Albert Eduard (17 June 1882 – 23 February 1918); became the Grand Duke of Mecklenburg-Strelitz in 1914.
- Karl Borwin Christian Alexander Arthur (10 October 1888 – 24 August 1908); killed in a duel with his brother-in-law Count George Jametel, defending his sister's honor.

== Later life ==
Following the death of her father-in-law on the 30 May 1904, she became The Grand Duchess of Mecklenburg-Strelitz following her husband's ascension to the throne. After her husband's death in 1914, she was titled Grand Duchess Elisabeth of Mecklenburg-Strelitz, since her mother-in-law was still alive. Only after her death in 1916 that Elisabeth officially became The Dowager Grand Duchess of Mecklenburg-Strelitz.

After the death of her eldest son, Grand Duke Adolf Frederick, in 1918 she inherited the 'hunting castle' of Prillwitz. She died in Neustrelitz on 20 July 1933. After her death, the castle of Prillwitz was inherited by her surviving children, which were her two adult daughters. Only Marie, eldest of these, has descendants who are members of the House of Lippe.

== Ancestry ==
Ancestors of Princess Elisabeth of Anhalt

8. Frederick, Hereditary Prince of Anhalt-Dessau
4. Leopold IV, Duke of Anhalt
9. Princess Amalie of Hesse-Homburg
2. Frederick I, Duke of Anhalt
10. Prince Louis Charles of Prussia
5. Princess Frederica of Prussia
11. Duchess Frederica of Mecklenburg-Strelitz
1. Princess Elisabeth of Anhalt
12. Frederick, Duke of Saxe-Altenburg
6. Prince Eduard of Saxe-Altenburg
13. Duchess Charlotte of Mecklenburg-Strelitz
3. Princess Antoinette of Saxe-Altenburg
14. Karl, Prince of Hohenzollern-Sigmaringen
7. Princess Amalie of Hohenzollern-Sigmaringen
15. Marie Antoinette Murat

Princess Elisabeth of Anhalt House of Ascania Born: 7 September 1857 Died: 20 July 1933
German royalty
Preceded by Princess Augusta of Cambridge	Grand Duchess consort of Mecklenburg-Strelitz; 1904–1914	Succeeded by None; Monarchy abolished in 1918
