= Adolphus Frederick V =

Grand Duke of Mecklenburg-Strelitz from 1904 to 1914

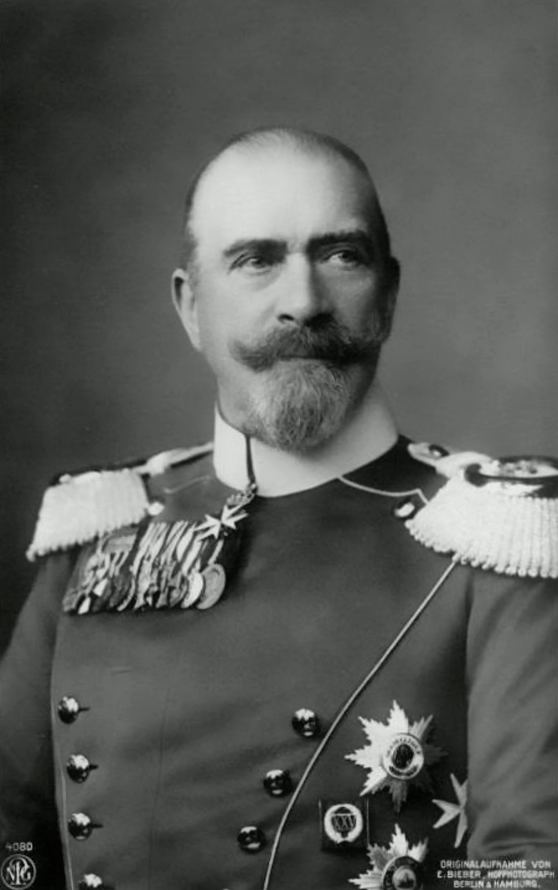
- Adolphus Frederick V in 1912

Grand Duke of Mecklenburg-Strelitz
- Reign: 30 May 1904 – 11 June 1914
- Predecessor: Frederick William
- Successor: Adolf Frederick VI
- Born: 22 July 1848; Neustrelitz, Mecklenburg-Strelitz, Germany
- Died: 11 June 1914 (aged 65); Berlin, Prussia, Germany
- Burial: 16 June 1914; Mirow, Mecklenburg-Strelitz
- Spouse: Princess Elisabeth of Anhalt (m. 1877)
- Issue: Marie, Princess Julius Ernst of Lippe; Jutta, Crown Princess of Montenegro; Adolphus Frederick VI, Grand Duke of Mecklenburg-Strelitz; Duke Karl Borwin
Names
- German: Georg Adolf Friedrich Victor Ernst Adalbert Gustav Wilhelm Wellington
- House: Mecklenburg-Strelitz
- Father: Frederick William, Grand Duke of Mecklenburg-Strelitz
- Mother: Augusta of Cambridge

Adolphus Frederick V (German: Adolf Friedrich V; 22 July 1848 – 11 June 1914) was reigning grand duke of Mecklenburg-Strelitz from 1904 to 1914.

== Biography ==
Duke George Adolphus Frederick Augustus Victor Ernest Adalbert Gustavus William Wellington of Mecklenburg-Strelitz was born in Neustrelitz, the only surviving child of Frederick William, Grand Duke of Mecklenburg, and Princess Augusta of Cambridge. Following the death of his grandfather Grand Duke George on 6 September 1860, Adolphus Frederick became the heir apparent to the grand duchy of Mecklenburg-Strelitz with the title of Hereditary Grand Duke. Adolphus Frederick took part in the Franco-Prussian War and represented his father at the proclamation of King William I of Prussia as German Emperor at Versailles. He succeeded his father as grand duke on 30 May 1904.

His mother, Grand Duchess Augusta, was disgusted at her son's military ways. She wrote to her niece, Mary of Teck, "Strelitz that was never a Military State, suddenly is all drums and fifes, ... such a pity, a bad imitation of Schwerin & small German Courts, whilst we were a Gentlemanlike Civilian court!"

In 1907 Adolphus Frederick announced that he would grant Mecklenburg-Strelitz a constitution, but this was met with opposition from nobles. In his attempt to create a constitution he offered to pay $2,500,000 to the national treasury if the nobles and land-owning classes dropped their opposition. In 1912 he repeated attempts to create a constitution for Mecklenburg-Strelitz, which along with Mecklenburg-Schwerin were the only European states without one.

In January 1914, Adolphus Frederick was reported to be the second richest person in Germany after the Emperor William II with a fortune of $88,750,000.

Adolphus Frederick died in Berlin and was succeeded by his eldest son Adolphus Frederick VI.

== Marriage and children ==
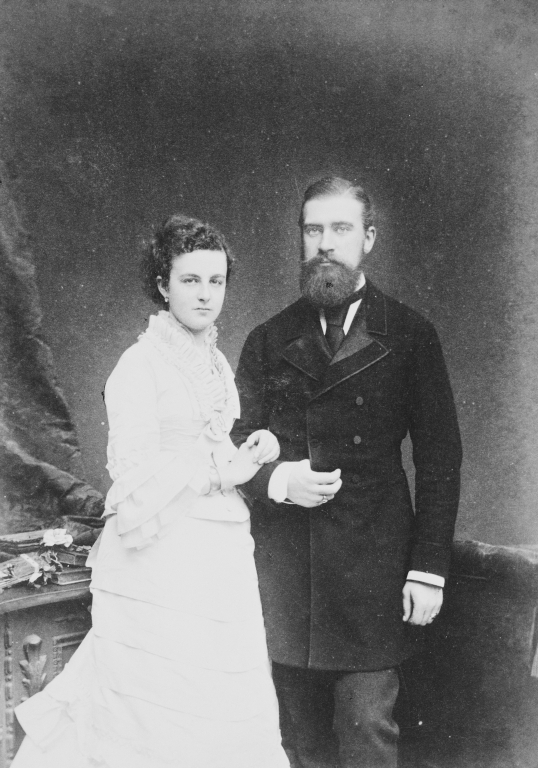
Adolphus Frederick with his wife, Elisabeth of Anhalt, 1877

Adolphus Frederick was married on 17 April 1877 in Dessau to Elisabeth of Anhalt. His mother commented on his wife, "She welters in happiness at her luxurious "Schloss" wearing a new Paris dress daily, Diamonds, also, when we are quite entre nous - Yes, she does enjoy being a Grand Duchess! poor dear, I am glad she does, for I never did."

Adolphus Frederick and Elisabeth had four children.

- Duchess Marie of Mecklenburg-Strelitz (1878–1948) married 22 June 1899 and divorced 31 December 1908 Count George Jametel (1859–1944), married secondly on 11 August 1914 Prince Julius Ernst of Lippe (1873–1952).
- Duchess Jutta of Mecklenburg-Strelitz (1880–1946) married 27 July 1899 Danilo, Crown Prince of Montenegro.
- Adolphus Frederick VI, Grand Duke of Mecklenburg-Strelitz (1882–1918).
- Duke Karl Borwin of Mecklenburg-Strelitz (Karl Borwin Christian Alexander Arthur, Herzog von Mecklenburg-Strelitz; 10 October 1888 – 24 August 1908); killed in a duel with his brother-in-law Count George Jametel, defending his sister's honor.

== Honours ==
He received the following orders and decorations:

- Mecklenburg:
  - Grand Cross of the Wendish Crown, with Crown in Ore, 17 October 1865; Joint Grand Master with Collar, 30 May 1904
  - Grand Cross of the Griffon (Schwerin)
  - Memorial Medal for Grand Duke Friedrich Franz III (Schwerin)
  - Military Merit Cross (Schwerin)
  - Cross for Distinction in War (Strelitz)
  - Military Service Cross (Strelitz)
- Anhalt: Grand Cross of the Order of Albert the Bear, 22 May 1866
- Baden:
  - Knight of the House Order of Fidelity, 1889
  - Knight of the Order of Berthold the First, 1889
- Bavaria: Knight of St. Hubert, 1905
- Brunswick: Grand Cross of the Order of Henry the Lion, 1867
- (Saxe-Coburg and Gotha) (Duchy of Saxe-Altenburg) (Saxe-Meiningen) Ernestine duchies: Grand Cross of the Saxe-Ernestine House Order, 1877
- Saxony: Knight of the Rue Crown, 1873
- (Grand Duchy of Hesse) Hesse and by Rhine:
  - Grand Cross of the Ludwig Order, 25 April 1877
  - Knight of the Golden Lion, 18 June 1882
- Oldenburg: Grand Cross of the Order of Duke Peter Friedrich Ludwig, with Collar and Golden Crown
- Prussia:
  - Iron Cross (1870), 2nd Class on Black Band
  - Knight of the Black Eagle, 7 December 1876; with Collar, 1877
  - Grand Commander's Cross of the Royal House Order of Hohenzollern, 23 February 1893
  - Grand Cross of the Red Eagle
  - Knight of Justice of the Johanniter Order
  - War Commemorative Medal of 1870/71
- (Hohenzollern-Sigmaringen) Hohenzollern: Cross of Honour of the Princely House Order of Hohenzollern, 1st Class
- (Kingdom of Hanover) Hanoverian Royal Family: Grand Cross of the Royal Guelphic Order
- Schaumburg-Lippe: Military Merit Medal
- Württemberg: Grand Cross of the Württemberg Crown, 1891
- Denmark: Knight of the Elephant, 19 August 1904
- Montenegro:
  - Knight of St. Peter of Cetinje
  - Grand Cross of the Order of Prince Danilo I
- Romania: Grand Cross of the Star of Romania
- Russia:
  - Knight of St. George, 4th Class, July 1874
  - Knight of St. Andrew, 1891
  - Knight of St. Alexander Nevsky
  - Knight of the White Eagle
  - Knight of St. Anna, 1st Class
  - Knight of St. Stanislaus, 1st Class
- United Kingdom:
  - Honorary Grand Cross of the Bath (civil), 17 April 1877
  - Knight of the Garter, 19 June 1911

== Ancestry ==
Ancestors of Adolphus Frederick V

8. Charles II, Grand Duke of Mecklenburg-Strelitz
4. George, Grand Duke of Mecklenburg-Strelitz
9. Princess Friederike of Hesse-Darmstadt
2. Frederick William, Grand Duke of Mecklenburg-Strelitz
10. Prince Frederick of Hesse-Kassel
5. Princess Marie of Hesse-Kassel
11. Princess Caroline of Nassau-Usingen
1. Adolphus Frederick V, Grand Duke of Mecklenburg-Strelitz
12. George III of the United Kingdom
6. Prince Adolphus, Duke of Cambridge
13. Duchess Charlotte of Mecklenburg-Strelitz
3. Princess Augusta of Cambridge
14. Prince Frederick of Hesse-Kassel (= 10)
7. Princess Augusta of Hesse-Kassel
15. Princess Caroline of Nassau-Usingen (= 11)

== Books ==
- Louda, Jiri; Michael Maclagan (1981). Lines of Succession. London: Orbis Publishing. ISBN 0-85613-276-4.
- Finestone, Jeffrey; Robert Massie (introduction) (1981). The Last Courts of Europe. London: J M Dent & Sons Ltd. ISBN 0-460-04519-9.
- Pope-Hennessey, James (2000). Queen Mary. London: Phoenix Press. ISBN I 84212 032 8.

Adolphus Frederick V House of Mecklenburg-Strelitz Cadet branch of the House of Mecklenburg Born: 22 July 1848 Died: 11 June 1914
Regnal titles
Preceded by Frederick William	Grand Duke of Mecklenburg-Strelitz; 1904–1914	Succeeded by Adolphus Frederick VI
