= Stephan, Prince of Lippe =

Stephan
- Prince of Lippe
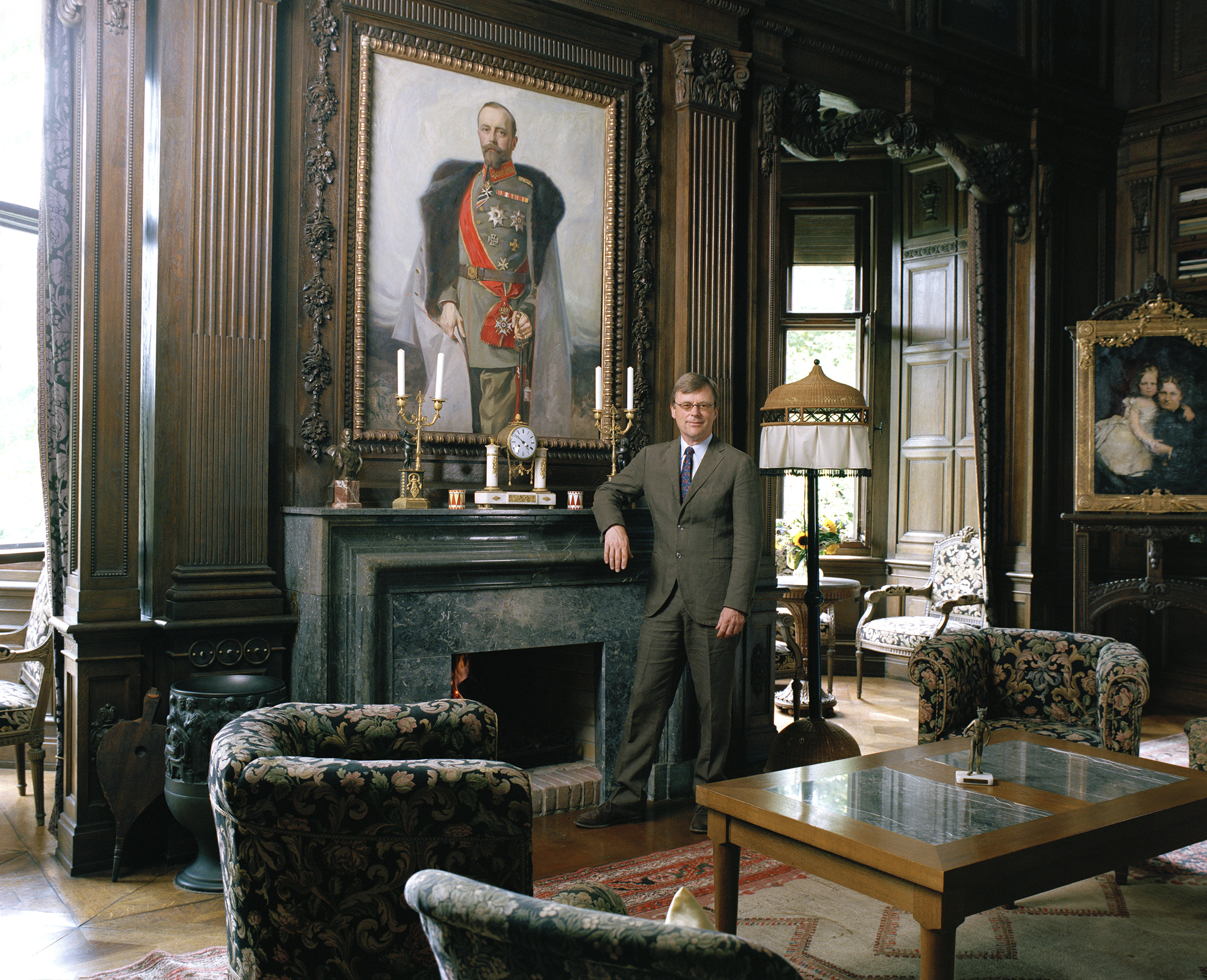
- Stephan, Prince of Lippe photographed by Oliver Mark, Detmold 2012

Head of the House of Lippe
- Period: 20 August 2015 – present
- Predecessor: Armin, Prince of Lippe
- Heir-Apparent: Bernhard, Hereditary Prince of Lippe
- Born: 24 May 1959 (age 67); Detmold, West Germany
- Spouse: Countess Maria of Solms-Laubach (m. 1994)
- Issue: Bernhard, Hereditary Prince of Lippe; Prince Heinrich-Otto; Prince Wilhelm; Princess Luise; Princess Mathilde
- House: Lippe
- Father: Armin, Prince of Lippe
- Mother: Traute Becker

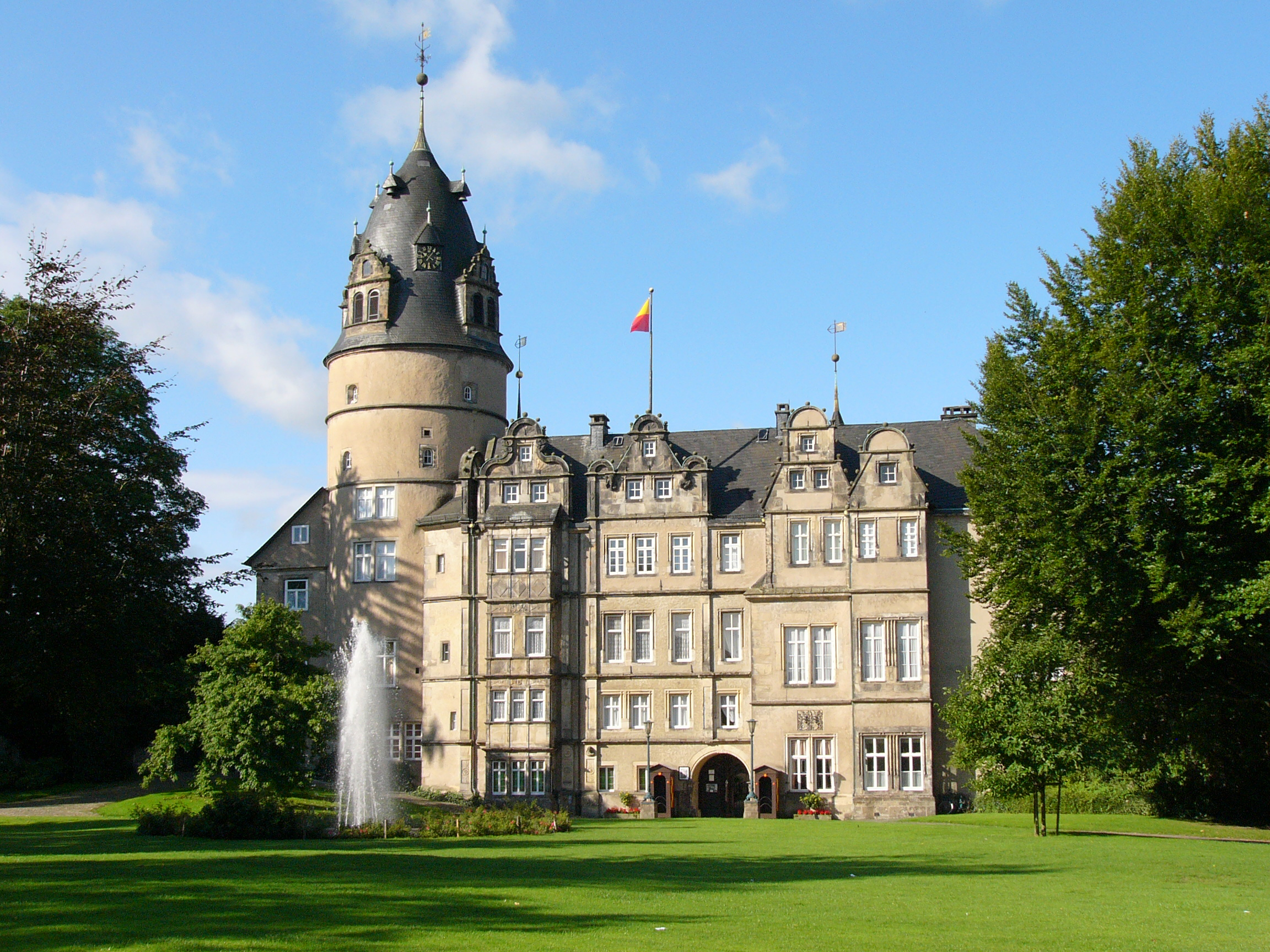
The princely castle at Detmold

Stephan, Prince of Lippe (Stephan Leopold Justus Richard Prinz zur Lippe, pronounced [ˈʃtɛfan ˈleːopɔlt ˈjʊstʊs ˈʁɪçaʁt ˈpʁɪnts tsuːɐ̯ ˈlɪpə]; born 24 May 1959), is the current head of the House of Lippe since 2015.

== Biography ==
Born into the main branch of the House of Lippe, he was an only child and son of Armin, Prince of Lippe by his wife, Traute Becker.

The prince is the owner of Detmold Castle which is open to the public.

He is a lawyer and became known for his opposition to a nature reserve in the district of Lippe which would have included large parts of his forests.

== Family ==
He married Countess Maria of Solms-Laubach, the eighth child and youngest daughter of Otto, 10th Count of Solms-Laubach by his wife, Princess Madeleine of Sayn-Wittgenstein-Berleburg, on 15 October 1994 in Detmold.

Prince Stephan and his wife, Princess Maria currently live at Detmold Castle and have five children, three sons and two daughters.

Stephan, Prince of Lippe House of Lippe Born: 24 May 1959
Titles in pretence
Preceded by Prince Armin	— TITULAR — Prince of Lippe; 20 August 2015 – present Reason for succession failure: Principality abolished in 1918	Incumbent; Heir: Prince Bernhard
