= Princess Augusta of Cambridge =

Grand Duchess of Mecklenburg-Strelitz from 1860 to 1904

Princess Augusta
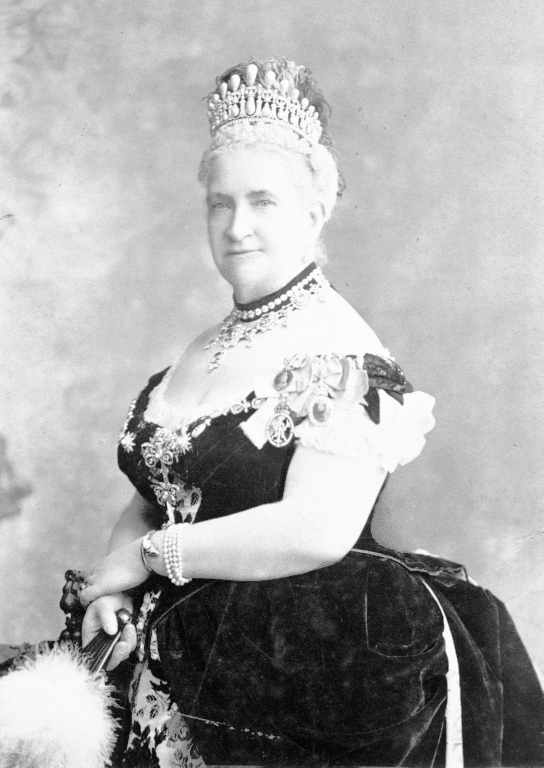
- The Grand Duchess c. 1887

Grand Duchess consort of Mecklenburg-Strelitz
- Tenure: 6 September 1860 – 30 May 1904
- Born: 19 July 1822; Palace of Montbrillant, Hanover
- Died: 5 December 1916 (aged 94); Neustrelitz, Mecklenburg-Strelitz
- Burial: 7 December 1916; Mirow, Mecklenburg-Strelitz
- Spouse: Frederick William, Grand Duke of Mecklenburg-Strelitz (m. 1843; died 1904)
- Issue: Duke Frederick William; Adolphus Frederick V, Grand Duke of Mecklenburg-Strelitz
Names
- Augusta Caroline Charlotte Elizabeth Mary Sophia Louise
- House: Hanover
- Father: Prince Adolphus, Duke of Cambridge
- Mother: Princess Augusta of Hesse-Kassel

Princess Augusta of Cambridge (Augusta Caroline Charlotte Elizabeth Mary Sophia Louise; 19 July 1822 – 5 December 1916) was a member of the British royal family as the granddaughter of George III. She married into the Grand Ducal House of Mecklenburg-Strelitz and became Grand Duchess of Mecklenburg-Strelitz.

== Early life ==
Augusta was born Princess Augusta of Cambridge on 19 July 1822 at the Palace of Montbrillant, Hanover. Her father was Prince Adolphus, Duke of Cambridge, the seventh son of George III and Charlotte of Mecklenburg-Strelitz. Her mother was Princess Augusta of Hesse-Kassel. As the male-line granddaughter of a British monarch, she was titled a British princess with the style of Royal Highness. The young princess was baptised at the same palace on 16 August 1822, by Rev Edward Curtis Kemp (Chaplain to the British Ambassador to the Court of Berlin, The Rt. Hon. Sir George Rose). Three of her godparents were present at the baptism:

- Princess Frederick of Hesse-Kassel (her maternal grandmother)
- Princess Luise Henriette of Nassau-Usingen (her maternal grandaunt)
- Princess Louise, Countess von der Decken (her maternal aunt)

The rest were not present, possibly being represented by proxies:

- The Duke of York and Albany (her paternal uncle)
- all of her five living paternal aunts (by blood)
  - The Queen Dowager of Württemberg
  - The Princess Augusta Sophia
  - The Landgravine of Hesse-Homburg
  - The Duchess of Gloucester and Edinburgh
  - The Princess Sophia
- The Electress of Hesse (wife of Wilhelm II, her mother's cousin)
- The Grand Duchess of Mecklenburg-Strelitz (her maternal aunt)
- Princess Charles of Hesse-Kassel (wife of her maternal uncle)

The Princess spent her earlier years in Hanover, where her father was the viceroy on behalf of his brother, George IV.

Princess Augusta had one brother, Prince George, later 2nd Duke of Cambridge; and one sister, Princess Mary Adelaide, later Duchess of Teck. Princess Augusta was also the aunt to Mary of Teck, later consort of George V. Additionally, Princess Augusta was the first cousin through her father to Queen Victoria and through her mother to Princess Louise of Hesse-Kassel, the wife of King Christian IX of Denmark.

With her mother, she was part of the royal party at the 1838 coronation of Queen Victoria.

== Marriage ==
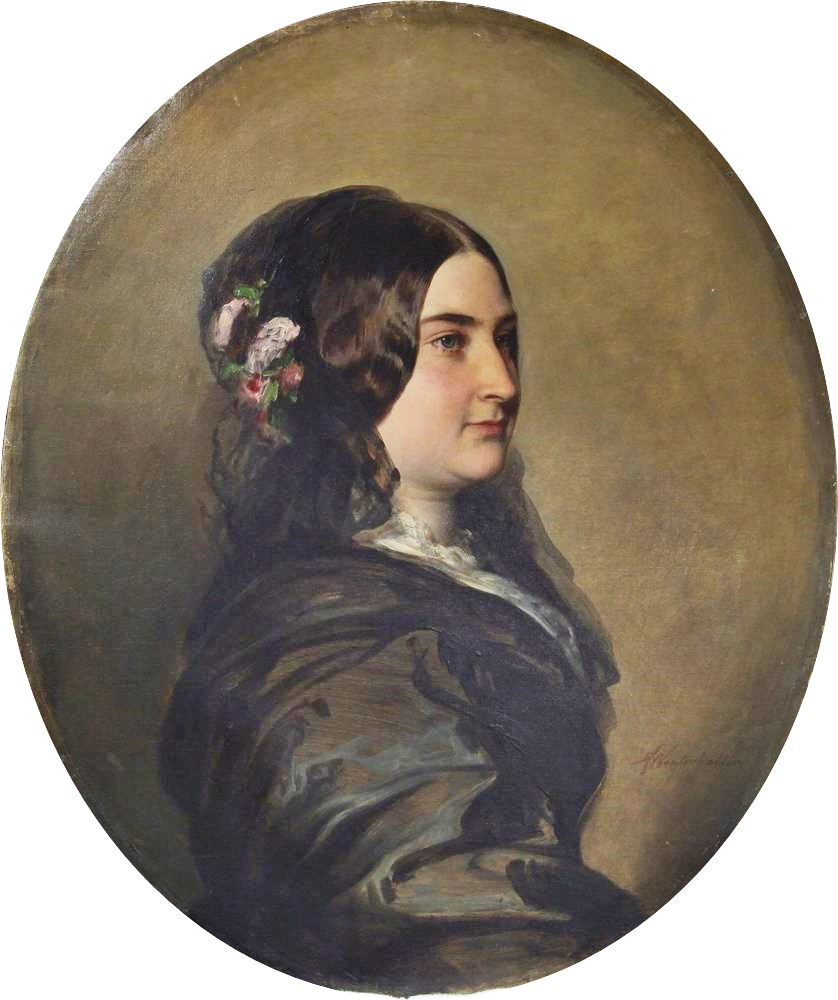
Portrait by Franz Xaver Winterhalter, 1846

On 28 June 1843, Princess Augusta married her first cousin, Frederick William of Mecklenburg-Strelitz, in the newly built Private Chapel at Buckingham Palace, London (they were also second cousins on their fathers' side). Upon marriage, Augusta became the Hereditary Grand Duchess of Mecklenburg-Strelitz and, on 6 September 1860, the Grand Duchess of Mecklenburg-Strelitz following the death of her father-in-law.

The marriage of the Grand Duke and Grand Duchess produced two sons:

- Duke Frederick William of Mecklenburg-Strelitz (born and died in London, 13 January 1845)
- Duke Adolphus Frederick of Mecklenburg-Strelitz (22 July 1848 – 11 June 1914); succeeded his father as Adolphus Frederick V in May 1904.

== Grand Duchess of Mecklenburg-Strelitz ==
Although she spent most of her adult life in Germany, the Grand Duchess Augusta retained close personal ties to the British Royal Family. She frequently visited her mother, the Duchess of Cambridge, at her Kensington Palace apartments.

After her mother's death in 1889, the Grand Duchess acquired a house—thereafter known as Mecklenburg House—at 16 Buckingham Gate, London, where she spent a portion of the year until advanced old age made it impossible for her to travel abroad.

In making preparations for the coronation of King Edward VII and Queen Alexandra in 1902, the Duke of Norfolk consulted her on matters of etiquette and attire. This was due to her presence at the coronation of King William IV and Queen Adelaide 71 years earlier. She was 9 years old at the time and kissed the Queen's hand. She was also able to provide details of the coronation of Queen Victoria.

The Grand Duchess of Mecklenburg-Strelitz was particularly close to her niece, the future Queen Mary. However, old age prevented her from attending the coronation of King George V and Queen Mary on 22 June 1911.

Following the outbreak of World War I, the British Government suspended the annuity she had been receiving as a member of the British Royal Family under the Annuity, Duchess of Mecklenburgh Strelitz Act 1843. During the war, the Swedish Embassy passed letters from the Queen to her aunt, who still lived in Germany.

As an elderly lady, she was known for being cantankerous. She was also known as being quite shrewd and intelligent. In his book, Queen Mary (London, 1959), the Queen's official biography, James Pope-Hennessy reports that the Queen's aunt Augusta was not fond of the new science of photography, fearing it would intrude deeply into the private lives of Royal personages.

The Dowager Grand Duchess of Mecklenburg-Strelitz died on 5 December 1916 in Neustrelitz and was buried in Mirow. As the longest-lived grandchild of George III, she was the last link to the British branch of the House of Hanover.

At the time of her death, she was 94 years, 4 months and 16 days old, making her the longest-lived British princess by blood, until Princess Alice, Countess of Athlone, a male-line granddaughter of Queen Victoria, surpassed her in 1977. Her will was sealed and in 1920 her estate was valued at £57,282 (or £1.7 million in 2022 when adjusted for inflation).

== Titles, styles and honours ==
=== Titles and styles ===
- 19 July 1822 – 28 June 1843: Her Royal Highness Princess Augusta of Cambridge
- 28 June 1843 – 6 September 1860: Her Royal Highness The Hereditary Grand Duchess of Mecklenburg-Strelitz
- 6 September 1860 – 30 May 1904: Her Royal Highness The Grand Duchess of Mecklenburg-Strelitz
- 30 May 1904 – 5 December 1916: Her Royal Highness The Dowager Grand Duchess of Mecklenburg-Strelitz

=== Honours ===
- United Kingdom:
  - Royal Family Order of George IV
  - Companion of the Imperial Order of the Crown of India, 1878
- German Empire:
  - Dame of the Order of Louise, 1st Division
  - Ladies Merit Cross
  - Hesse and by Rhine: Dame of the Grand Ducal Hessian Order of the Golden Lion, 1 July 1889
- Russian Empire: Dame Grand Cross of the Imperial Order of Saint Catherine

== Ancestors ==
Ancestors of Princess Augusta of Cambridge

8. Frederick Louis, Prince of Wales
4. George III of the United Kingdom
9. Princess Augusta of Saxe-Gotha-Altenburg
2. Prince Adolphus, Duke of Cambridge
10. Duke Charles Louis Frederick of Mecklenburg-Strelitz
5. Duchess Charlotte of Mecklenburg-Strelitz
11. Princess Elisabeth Albertine of Saxe-Hildburghausen
1. Princess Augusta of Cambridge
12. Frederick II, Landgrave of Hesse-Kassel
6. Prince Frederick of Hesse-Kassel
13. Princess Mary of Great Britain
3. Princess Augusta of Hesse-Kassel
14. Charles William, Prince of Nassau-Usingen
7. Princess Caroline of Nassau-Usingen
15. Countess Caroline Felizitas of Leiningen-Dagsburg-Falkenburg

Princess Augusta of Cambridge House of Hanover Cadet branch of the House of Welf Born: 19 July 1822 Died: 5 December 1916
German royalty
Preceded by Princess Marie of Hesse-Kassel	Grand Duchess consort of Mecklenburg-Strelitz; 1860–1904	Succeeded by Princess Elisabeth of Anhalt
